= List of EC numbers (EC 2) =

This list contains a list of EC numbers for the second group, EC 2, transferases, placed in numerical order as determined by the Nomenclature Committee of the International Union of Biochemistry and Molecular Biology. All official information is tabulated at the website of the committee. The database is developed and maintained by Andrew McDonald.

== EC 2.1: Transferring One-Carbon Groups ==
=== EC 2.1.1: Methyltransferases ===
- EC 2.1.1.1: nicotinamide N-methyltransferase
- EC 2.1.1.2: guanidinoacetate N-methyltransferase
- EC 2.1.1.3: thetin—homocysteine S-methyltransferase
- EC 2.1.1.4: acetylserotonin O-methyltransferase
- EC 2.1.1.5: betaine—homocysteine S-methyltransferase
- EC 2.1.1.6: catechol O-methyltransferase
- EC 2.1.1.7: nicotinate N-methyltransferase
- EC 2.1.1.8: histamine N-methyltransferase
- EC 2.1.1.9: thiol S-methyltransferase
- EC 2.1.1.10: homocysteine S-methyltransferase
- EC 2.1.1.11: magnesium protoporphyrin IX methyltransferase
- EC 2.1.1.12: methionine S-methyltransferase
- EC 2.1.1.13: methionine synthase
- EC 2.1.1.14: 5-methyltetrahydropteroyltriglutamate—homocysteine S-methyltransferase
- EC 2.1.1.15: fatty-acid O-methyltransferase
- EC 2.1.1.16: methylene-fatty-acyl-phospholipid synthase
- EC 2.1.1.17: phosphatidylethanolamine N-methyltransferase
- EC 2.1.1.18: polysaccharide O-methyltransferase
- EC 2.1.1.19: trimethylsulfonium—tetrahydrofolate N-methyltransferase
- EC 2.1.1.20: glycine N-methyltransferase
- EC 2.1.1.21: methylamine—glutamate N-methyltransferase
- EC 2.1.1.22: carnosine N-methyltransferase
- EC 2.1.1.23: now covered by EC 2.1.1.124, EC 2.1.1.125 and EC 2.1.1.126
- EC 2.1.1.24: now covered by EC 2.1.1.77, EC 2.1.1.80 and EC 2.1.1.100
- EC 2.1.1.25: phenol O-methyltransferase
- EC 2.1.1.26: iodophenol O-methyltransferase
- EC 2.1.1.27: tyramine N-methyltransferase
- EC 2.1.1.28: phenylethanolamine N-methyltransferase
- EC 2.1.1.29: Now covered by EC 2.1.1.202, EC 2.1.1.203 and EC .1.1.204
- EC 2.1.1.30: tRNA (purine-2- or -6-)-methyltransferase: Reactions previously described are due to EC 2.1.1.32
- EC 2.1.1.31: Now covered by EC 2.1.1.221 and EC 2.1.1.228
- EC 2.1.1.32: Now covered by EC 2.1.1.213, EC 2.1.1.214, EC 2.1.1.215 and EC 2.1.1.216
- EC 2.1.1.33: tRNA (guanine^{46}-N^{7})-methyltransferase
- EC 2.1.1.34: tRNA (guanosine^{18}-2′-O)-methyltransferase
- EC 2.1.1.35: tRNA (uracil^{54}-C^{5})-methyltransferase
- EC 2.1.1.36: Now covered by EC 2.1.1.217, EC 2.1.1.218, EC 2.1.1.219, EC 2.1.1.220
- EC 2.1.1.37: DNA (cytosine-5-)-methyltransferase
- EC 2.1.1.38: O-demethylpuromycin O-methyltransferase
- EC 2.1.1.39: inositol 3-methyltransferase
- EC 2.1.1.40: inositol 1-methyltransferase
- EC 2.1.1.41: sterol 24-C-methyltransferase
- EC 2.1.1.42: flavone 3′-O-methyltransferase
- EC 2.1.1.43: Now described by EC 2.1.1.354, EC 2.1.1.355, EC 2.1.1.356, EC 2.1.1.357, EC 2.1.1.358, EC 2.1.1.359, EC 2.1.1.360, EC 2.1.1.361 and EC 2.1.1.362
- EC 2.1.1.44: L-histidine N^{α}-methyltransferase
- EC 2.1.1.45: thymidylate synthase
- EC 2.1.1.46: isoflavone 4′-O-methyltransferase
- EC 2.1.1.47: indolepyruvate C-methyltransferase
- EC 2.1.1.48: Now covered by EC 2.1.1.181, EC 2.1.1.182, EC 2.1.1.183 and EC 2.1.1.184
- EC 2.1.1.49: amine N-methyltransferase
- EC 2.1.1.50: loganate O-methyltransferase
- EC 2.1.1.51: Now covered by EC 2.1.1.187 and EC 2.1.1.188
- EC 2.1.1.52: Now covered by EC 2.1.1.171, EC 2.1.1.172, EC 2.1.1.173 and EC 2.1.1.174
- EC 2.1.1.53: putrescine N-methyltransferase
- EC 2.1.1.54: deoxycytidylate C-methyltransferase
- EC 2.1.1.55: tRNA (adenine-N^{6}-)-methyltransferase
- EC 2.1.1.56: mRNA (guanine-N^{7})-methyltransferase
- EC 2.1.1.57: methyltransferase cap1
- EC 2.1.1.58: deleted, included in EC 2.1.1.57
- EC 2.1.1.59: [cytochrome c]-lysine N-methyltransferase
- EC 2.1.1.60: calmodulin-lysine N-methyltransferase
- EC 2.1.1.61: tRNA (5-methylaminomethyl-2-thiouridylate)-methyltransferase
- EC 2.1.1.62: mRNA (2′-O-methyladenosine-N^{6}-)-methyltransferase
- EC 2.1.1.63: methylated-DNA—[protein]-cysteine S-methyltransferase
- EC 2.1.1.64: 3-demethylubiquinol 3-O-methyltransferase
- EC 2.1.1.65: licodione 2′-O-methyltransferase
- EC 2.1.1.66: Now covered by EC 2.1.1.230
- EC 2.1.1.67: thiopurine S-methyltransferase
- EC 2.1.1.68: caffeate O-methyltransferase
- EC 2.1.1.69: 5-hydroxyfuranocoumarin 5-O-methyltransferase
- EC 2.1.1.70: 8-hydroxyfuranocoumarin 8-O-methyltransferase
- EC 2.1.1.71: phosphatidyl-N-methylethanolamine N-methyltransferase
- EC 2.1.1.72: site-specific DNA-methyltransferase (adenine-specific)
- EC 2.1.1.73: deleted: reaction is that of EC 2.1.1.37, DNA (cytosine-5-)-methyltransferase
- EC 2.1.1.74: methylenetetrahydrofolate—tRNA-(uracil^{54}-C^{5})-methyltransferase [NAD(P)H-oxidizing]
- EC 2.1.1.75: apigenin 4′-O-methyltransferase
- EC 2.1.1.76: quercetin 3-O-methyltransferase
- EC 2.1.1.77: protein-L-isoaspartate(D-aspartate) O-methyltransferase
- EC 2.1.1.78: isoorientin 3′-O-methyltransferase
- EC 2.1.1.79: cyclopropane-fatty-acyl-phospholipid synthase
- EC 2.1.1.80: protein-glutamate O-methyltransferase
- EC 2.1.1.81: deleted, included in EC 2.1.1.49
- EC 2.1.1.82: 3-methylquercetin 7-O-methyltransferase
- EC 2.1.1.83: 3,7-dimethylquercetin 4′-O-methyltransferase
- EC 2.1.1.84: methylquercetagetin 6-O-methyltransferase
- EC 2.1.1.85: protein-histidine N-methyltransferase
- EC 2.1.1.86: Now covered by EC 7.2.1.4
- EC 2.1.1.87: pyridine N-methyltransferase
- EC 2.1.1.88: 8-hydroxyquercetin 8-O-methyltransferase
- EC 2.1.1.89: tetrahydrocolumbamine 2-O-methyltransferase
- EC 2.1.1.90: methanol—5-hydroxybenzimidazolylcobamide Co-methyltransferase
- EC 2.1.1.91: isobutyraldoxime O-methyltransferase
- EC 2.1.1.92: Now included with EC 2.1.1.69
- EC 2.1.1.93: is identical to EC 2.1.1.70, 8-hydroxyfuranocoumarin 8-O-methyltransferase
- EC 2.1.1.94: tabersonine 16-O-methyltransferase
- EC 2.1.1.95: tocopherol C-methyltransferase
- EC 2.1.1.96: thioether S-methyltransferase
- EC 2.1.1.97: 3-hydroxyanthranilate 4-C-methyltransferase
- EC 2.1.1.98: diphthine synthase
- EC 2.1.1.99: 3-hydroxy-16-methoxy-2,3-dihydrotabersonine N-methyltransferase
- EC 2.1.1.100: protein-S-isoprenylcysteine O-methyltransferase
- EC 2.1.1.101: macrocin O-methyltransferase
- EC 2.1.1.102: demethylmacrocin O-methyltransferase
- EC 2.1.1.103: phosphoethanolamine N-methyltransferase
- EC 2.1.1.104: caffeoyl-CoA O-methyltransferase
- EC 2.1.1.105: N-benzoyl-4-hydroxyanthranilate 4-O-methyltransferase
- EC 2.1.1.106: tryptophan 2-C-methyltransferase
- EC 2.1.1.107: uroporphyrinogen-III C-methyltransferase
- EC 2.1.1.108: 6-hydroxymellein O-methyltransferase
- EC 2.1.1.109: demethylsterigmatocystin 6-O-methyltransferase
- EC 2.1.1.110: sterigmatocystin 8-O-methyltransferase
- EC 2.1.1.111: anthranilate N-methyltransferase
- EC 2.1.1.112: glucuronoxylan 4-O-methyltransferase
- EC 2.1.1.113: site-specific DNA-methyltransferase (cytosine-N^{4}-specific)
- EC 2.1.1.114: polyprenyldihydroxybenzoate methyltransferase
- EC 2.1.1.115: (RS)-1-benzyl-1,2,3,4-tetrahydroisoquinoline N-methyltransferase
- EC 2.1.1.116: 3′-hydroxy-N-methyl-(S)-coclaurine 4′-O-methyltransferase
- EC 2.1.1.117: (S)-scoulerine 9-O-methyltransferase
- EC 2.1.1.118: columbamine O-methyltransferase
- EC 2.1.1.119: 10-hydroxydihydrosanguinarine 10-O-methyltransferase
- EC 2.1.1.120: 12-hydroxydihydrochelirubine 12-O-methyltransferase
- EC 2.1.1.121: 6-O-methylnorlaudanosoline 5′-O-methyltransferase
- EC 2.1.1.122: (S)-tetrahydroprotoberberine N-methyltransferase
- EC 2.1.1.123: [cytochrome-c]-methionine S-methyltransferase
- EC 2.1.1.124: Now covered by EC 2.1.1.319, EC 2.1.1.320, EC 2.1.1.321 and EC 2.1.1.322
- EC 2.1.1.125: Now covered by EC 2.1.1.319, EC 2.1.1.320 and EC 2.1.1.321
- EC 2.1.1.126: Now covered by EC 2.1.1.319, EC 2.1.1.320 and EC 2.1.1.321
- EC 2.1.1.127: [ribulose-bisphosphate carboxylase]-lysine N-methyltransferase
- EC 2.1.1.128: (RS)-norcoclaurine 6-O-methyltransferase
- EC 2.1.1.129: inositol 4-methyltransferase
- EC 2.1.1.130: precorrin-2 C^{20}-methyltransferase
- EC 2.1.1.131: precorrin-2 C^{17}-methyltransferase
- EC 2.1.1.132: precorrin-6B C^{5,15}-methyltransferase (decarboxylating)
- EC 2.1.1.133: precorrin-4 C^{11}-methyltransferase
- EC 2.1.1.134: now with EC 2.1.1.129
- EC 2.1.1.135: now EC 1.16.1.8
- EC 2.1.1.136: chlorophenol O-methyltransferase
- EC 2.1.1.137: arsenite methyltransferase
- EC 2.1.1.138: deleted: Reaction due to EC 2.1.1.137
- EC 2.1.1.139: 3′-demethylstaurosporine O-methyltransferase
- EC 2.1.1.140: (S)-coclaurine-N-methyltransferase
- EC 2.1.1.141: jasmonate O-methyltransferase
- EC 2.1.1.142: cycloartenol 24-C-methyltransferase
- EC 2.1.1.143: 24-methylenesterol C-methyltransferase
- EC 2.1.1.144: trans-aconitate 2-methyltransferase
- EC 2.1.1.145: trans-aconitate 3-methyltransferase
- EC 2.1.1.146: (iso)eugenol O-methyltransferase
- EC 2.1.1.147: corydaline synthase
- EC 2.1.1.148: thymidylate synthase (FAD)
- EC 2.1.1.149: Now covered by EC 2.1.1.267, flavonoid 3′,5′-methyltransferase
- EC 2.1.1.150: isoflavone 7-O-methyltransferase
- EC 2.1.1.151: cobalt-factor II C^{20}-methyltransferase
- EC 2.1.1.152: precorrin-6A synthase (deacetylating)
- EC 2.1.1.153: vitexin 2′′-O-rhamnoside 7-O-methyltransferase
- EC 2.1.1.154: isoliquiritigenin 2′-O-methyltransferase
- EC 2.1.1.155: kaempferol 4′-O-methyltransferase
- EC 2.1.1.156: glycine/sarcosine N-methyltransferase
- EC 2.1.1.157: sarcosine/dimethylglycine N-methyltransferase
- EC 2.1.1.158: 7-methylxanthosine synthase
- EC 2.1.1.159: theobromine synthase
- EC 2.1.1.160: caffeine synthase
- EC 2.1.1.161: dimethylglycine N-methyltransferase
- EC 2.1.1.162: glycine/sarcosine/dimethylglycine N-methyltransferase
- EC 2.1.1.163: demethylmenaquinone methyltransferase
- EC 2.1.1.164: demethylrebeccamycin-D-glucose O-methyltransferase
- EC 2.1.1.165: methyl halide transferase
- EC 2.1.1.166: 23S rRNA (uridine^{2552}-2′-O)-methyltransferase
- EC 2.1.1.167: 27S pre-rRNA (guanosine^{2922}-2′-O)-methyltransferase
- EC 2.1.1.168: 21S rRNA (uridine^{2791}-2′-O)-methyltransferase
- EC 2.1.1.169: tricetin 3′,4′,5′-O-trimethyltransferase
- EC 2.1.1.170: 16S rRNA (guanine^{527}-N^{7})-methyltransferase
- EC 2.1.1.171: 16S rRNA (guanine^{966}-N^{2})-methyltransferase
- EC 2.1.1.172: 16S rRNA (guanine^{1207}-N^{2}))-methyltransferase
- EC 2.1.1.173: 23S rRNA (guanine^{2445}-N^{2})-methyltransferase
- EC 2.1.1.174: 23S rRNA (guanine^{1835}-N^{2})-methyltransferase
- EC 2.1.1.175: tricin synthase
- EC 2.1.1.176: 16S rRNA (cytosine^{967}-C^{5})-methyltransferase
- EC 2.1.1.177: 23S rRNA (pseudouridine^{1915}-N^{3})-methyltransferase
- EC 2.1.1.178: 16S rRNA (cytosine^{1407}-C^{5})-methyltransferase
- EC 2.1.1.179: 16S rRNA (guanine^{1405}-N^{7})-methyltransferase
- EC 2.1.1.180: 16S rRNA (adenine^{1408}-N^{1})-methyltransferase
- EC 2.1.1.181: 23S rRNA (adenine^{1618}-N^{6})-methyltransferase
- EC 2.1.1.182: 16S rRNA (adenine^{1518}-N^{6}/adenineadenine^{1519}-N^{6})-dimethyltransferase
- EC 2.1.1.183: 18S rRNA (adenine^{1779}-N^{6}/adenine^{1780}-N^{6})-dimethyltransferase
- EC 2.1.1.184: 23S rRNA (adenine^{2085}-N^{6})-dimethyltransferase
- EC 2.1.1.185: 23S rRNA (guanosine^{2251}-2′-O)-methyltransferase
- EC 2.1.1.186: 23S rRNA (cytidine^{2498}-2′-O)-methyltransferase
- EC 2.1.1.187: 23S rRNA (guanine^{745}-N^{1})-methyltransferase
- EC 2.1.1.188: 23S rRNA (guanine^{748}-N^{1})-methyltransferase
- EC 2.1.1.189: 23S rRNA (uracil^{747}-C^{5})-methyltransferase
- EC 2.1.1.190: 23S rRNA (uracil^{1939}-C^{5})-methyltransferase
- EC 2.1.1.191: 23S rRNA (cytosine^{1962}-C^{5})-methyltransferase
- EC 2.1.1.192: 23S rRNA (adenine^{2503}-C^{2})-methyltransferase
- EC 2.1.1.193: 16S rRNA (uracil^{1498}-N^{3})-methyltransferase
- EC 2.1.1.194: A mixture of EC 2.1.1.192 and EC 2.1.1.224
- EC 2.1.1.195: cobalt-precorrin-5B (C1)-methyltransferase
- EC 2.1.1.196: cobalt-precorrin-7 (C15)-methyltransferase (decarboxylating)
- EC 2.1.1.197: malonyl-[acyl-carrier protein] O-methyltransferase
- EC 2.1.1.198: 16S rRNA (cytidine^{1402}-2′-O)-methyltransferase
- EC 2.1.1.199: 16S rRNA (cytosine^{1402}-N^{4})-methyltransferase
- EC 2.1.1.200: tRNA (cytidine^{32}/uridine^{32}-2′-O)-methyltransferase
- EC 2.1.1.201: 2-methoxy-6-polyprenyl-1,4-benzoquinol methylase
- EC 2.1.1.202: multisite-specific tRNA:(cytosine-C^{5})-methyltransferase
- EC 2.1.1.203: tRNA (cytosine^{34}-C^{5})-methyltransferase
- EC 2.1.1.204: tRNA (cytosine^{38}-C^{5})-methyltransferase
- EC 2.1.1.205: tRNA (cytidine^{32}/guanosine^{34}-2′-O)-methyltransferase
- EC 2.1.1.206: tRNA (cytidine^{56}-2′-O)-methyltransferase
- EC 2.1.1.207: tRNA (cytidine^{34}-2′-O)-methyltransferase
- EC 2.1.1.208: 23S rRNA (uridine^{2479}-2′-O)-methyltransferase
- EC 2.1.1.209: 23S rRNA (guanine^{2535}-N^{1})-methyltransferase
- EC 2.1.1.210: demethylspheroidene O-methyltransferase
- EC 2.1.1.211: tRNA^{Ser}(uridine^{44}-2′-O)-methyltransferase
- EC 2.1.1.212: 2,7,4′-trihydroxyisoflavanone 4′-O-methyltransferase
- EC 2.1.1.213: tRNA (guanine1^{10}-N^{2})-dimethyltransferase
- EC 2.1.1.214: tRNA (guanine^{10}-N^{2})-methyltransferase
- EC 2.1.1.215: tRNA (guanine^{26}-N^{2}/guanine^{27}-N^{2})-dimethyltransferase
- EC 2.1.1.216: tRNA (guanine^{26}-N^{2})-dimethyltransferase
- EC 2.1.1.217: tRNA (adenine^{22}-N^{1})-methyltransferase
- EC 2.1.1.218: tRNA (adenine^{9}-N^{1})-methyltransferase
- EC 2.1.1.219: tRNA (adenine^{57}-N^{1}/adenine^{58}-N^{1})-methyltransferase
- EC 2.1.1.220: tRNA (adenine^{58}-N^{1})-methyltransferase
- EC 2.1.1.221: tRNA (guanine^{9}-N^{1})-methyltransferase
- EC 2.1.1.222: 2-polyprenyl-6-hydroxyphenyl methylase
- EC 2.1.1.223: tRNA_{1}^{Val} (adenine^{937}-N^{6})-methyltransferase
- EC 2.1.1.224: 23S rRNA (adenine^{2503}-C^{8})-methyltransferase
- EC 2.1.1.225: tRNA:m^{4}X modification enzyme
- EC 2.1.1.226: 23S rRNA (cytidine^{1920}-2′-O)-methyltransferase
- EC 2.1.1.227: 16S rRNA (cytidine^{1409}-2′-O)-methyltransferase
- EC 2.1.1.228: tRNA (guanine^{37}-N^{1})-methyltransferase
- EC 2.1.1.229: tRNA (carboxymethyluridine^{34}-5-O)-methyltransferase
- EC 2.1.1.230: 23S rRNA (adenosine^{1067}-2′-O)-methyltransferase
- EC 2.1.1.231: flavonoid 4′-O-methyltransferase
- EC 2.1.1.232: naringenin 7-O-methyltransferase
- EC 2.1.1.233: [phosphatase 2A protein]-leucine-carboxy methyltransferase
- EC 2.1.1.234: dTDP-3-amino-3,4,6-trideoxy-α-D-glucopyranose N,N-dimethyltransferase
- EC 2.1.1.235: dTDP-3-amino-3,6-dideoxy-α-D-glucopyranose N,N-dimethyltransferase
- EC 2.1.1.236: dTDP-3-amino-3,6-dideoxy-α-D-galactopyranose N,N-dimethyltransferase
- EC 2.1.1.237: mycinamicin III 3′′-O-methyltransferase
- EC 2.1.1.238: mycinamicin VI 2′′-O-methyltransferaseD
- EC 2.1.1.239: L-olivosyl-oleandolide 3-O-methyltransferase
- EC 2.1.1.240: trans-resveratrol di-O-methyltransferase
- EC 2.1.1.241: 2,4,7-trihydroxy-1,4-benzoxazin-3-one-glucoside 7-O-methyltransferase
- EC 2.1.1.242: 16S rRNA (guanine^{1516}-N^{2})-methyltransferase
- EC 2.1.1.243: 2-ketoarginine methyltransferase
- EC 2.1.1.244: protein N-terminal methyltransferase
- EC 2.1.1.245: 5-methyltetrahydrosarcinapterin—corrinoid/iron-sulfur protein Co-methyltransferase
- EC 2.1.1.246: [methyl-Co(III) methanol-specific corrinoid protein]—coenzyme M methyltransferase
- EC 2.1.1.247: (methyl-Co(III) methylamine-specific corrinoid protein)—coenzyme M methyltransferase
- EC 2.1.1.248: methylamine—corrinoid protein Co-methyltransferase
- EC 2.1.1.249: dimethylamine—corrinoid protein Co-methyltransferase
- EC 2.1.1.250: trimethylamine—corrinoid protein Co-methyltransferase
- EC 2.1.1.251: methylated-thiol—coenzyme M methyltransferase
- EC 2.1.1.252: tetramethylammonium—corrinoid protein Co-methyltransferase
- EC 2.1.1.253: [methyl-Co(III) tetramethylammonium-specific corrinoid protein]—coenzyme M methyltransferase
- EC 2.1.1.254: erythromycin 3′′-O-methyltransferase
- EC 2.1.1.255: geranyl diphosphate 2-C-methyltransferase
- EC 2.1.1.256: tRNA (guanine^{6}-N^{6}-methyltransferase)
- EC 2.1.1.257: tRNA (pseudouridine^{54}-N^{1})-methyltransferase
- EC 2.1.1.258: 5-methyltetrahydrofolate—corrinoid/iron-sulfur protein Co-methyltransferase
- EC 2.1.1.259: [fructose-bisphosphate aldolase]-lysine N-methyltransferase
- EC 2.1.1.260: rRNA small subunit pseudouridine methyltransferase Nep1
- EC 2.1.1.261: 4-dimethylallyltryptophan N-methyltransferase
- EC 2.1.1.262: squalene methyltransferase
- EC 2.1.1.263: botryococcene C-methyltransferase
- EC 2.1.1.264: 23S rRNA (guanine^{2069}-N^{7})-methyltransferase
- EC 2.1.1.265: tellurite methyltransferase
- EC 2.1.1.266: 23S rRNA (adenine^{2030}-N^{6})-methyltransferase
- EC 2.1.1.267: flavonoid 3′,5′-methyltransferase
- EC 2.1.1.268: tRNAThr (cytosine^{32}-N^{3})-methyltransferase
- EC 2.1.1.269: dimethylsulfoniopropionate demethylase
- EC 2.1.1.270: (+)-6a-hydroxymaackiain 3-''O''-methyltransferase
- EC 2.1.1.271: cobalt-precorrin-4 methyltransferase
- EC 2.1.1.272: cobalt-factor III methyltransferase
- EC 2.1.1.273: benzoate ''O''-methyltransferase
- EC 2.1.1.274: salicylate 1-''O''-methyltransferase
- EC 2.1.1.275: gibberellin A9 ''O''-methyltransferase
- EC 2.1.1.276: gibberellin A4 carboxyl methyltransferase
- EC 2.1.1.277: anthranilate ''O''-methyltransferase
- EC 2.1.1.278: indole-3-acetate ''O''-methyltransferase
- EC 2.1.1.279: ''trans''-anol ''O''-methyltransferase
- EC 2.1.1.280: selenocysteine ''Se''-methyltransferase
- EC 2.1.1.281: phenylpyruvate C^{3}-methyltransferase
- EC 2.1.1.282: tRNA^{Phe} 7-[(3-amino-3-carboxypropyl)-4-demethylwyosine^{37}-N^{4}]-methyltransferase
- EC 2.1.1.283: emodin O-methyltransferase
- EC 2.1.1.284: 8-demethylnovobiocic acid C^{8}-methyltransferase
- EC 2.1.1.285: demethyldecarbamoylnovobiocin ''O''-methyltransferase
- EC 2.1.1.286: 25S rRNA (adenine^{2142}-N^{1})-methyltransferase
- EC 2.1.1.287: 25S rRNA (adenine^{645}-N^{1})-methyltransferase
- EC 2.1.1.288: aklanonic acid methyltransferase
- EC 2.1.1.289: cobalt-precorrin-7 (C5)-methyltransferase
- EC 2.1.1.290: tRNA^{Phe} [7-(3-amino-3-carboxypropyl)wyosine^{37}-O]-methyltransferase
- EC 2.1.1.291: (''R,S'')-reticuline 7-''O''-methyltransferase
- EC 2.1.1.292: carminomycin 4-''O''-methyltransferase
- EC 2.1.1.293: 6-hydroxytryprostatin B ''O''-methyltransferase
- EC 2.1.1.294: 3-''O''-phospho-polymannosyl GlcNAc-diphospho-''ditrans,octacis''-undecaprenol 3-phospho-methyltransferase
- EC 2.1.1.295: 2-methyl-6-phytyl-1,4-hydroquinone methyltransferase
- EC 2.1.1.296: methyltransferase cap2
- EC 2.1.1.297: peptide chain release factor N^{5}-glutamine methyltransferase
- EC 2.1.1.298: ribosomal protein L3 N^{5}-glutamine methyltransferase
- EC 2.1.1.299: protein N-terminal monomethyltransferase
- EC 2.1.1.300: pavine ''N''-methyltransferase
- EC 2.1.1.301: cypemycin N-terminal methyltransferase
- EC 2.1.1.302: 3-hydroxy-5-methyl-1-naphthoate 3-''O''-methyltransferase
- EC 2.1.1.303: 2,7-dihydroxy-5-methyl-1-naphthoate 7-''O''-methyltransferase
- EC 2.1.1.304: L-tyrosine C^{3}-methyltransferase
- EC 2.1.1.305: 8-demethyl-8-α-L-rhamnosyltetracenomycin-C 2′-O-methyltransferase
- EC 2.1.1.306: 8-demethyl-8-(2-methoxy-α-L-rhamnosyl)tetracenomycin-C 3′-O-methyltransferase
- EC 2.1.1.307: 8-demethyl-8-(2,3-dimethoxy-α-L-rhamnosyl)tetracenomycin-C 4′-O-methyltransferase
- EC 2.1.1.308: cytidylyl-2-hydroxyethylphosphonate methyltransferase
- EC 2.1.1.309: 18S rRNA (guanine^{1575}-N^{7})-methyltransferase
- EC 2.1.1.310: 25S rRNA (cytosine^{2870}-C5)-methyltransferase
- EC 2.1.1.311: 25S rRNA (cytosine2278-C^{5})-methyltransferase
- EC 2.1.1.312: 25S rRNA (uracil^{2843}-N^{3})-methyltransferase
- EC 2.1.1.313: 25S rRNA (uracil^{2634}-N^{3})-methyltransferase
- EC 2.1.1.314: diphthine methyl ester synthase
- EC 2.1.1.315: 27-O-demethylrifamycin SV methyltransferase
- EC 2.1.1.316: mitomycin 6-''O''-methyltransferase
- EC 2.1.1.317: sphingolipid C^{9}-methyltransferase
- EC 2.1.1.318: [trehalose-6-phosphate synthase]-L-cysteine S-methyltransferase
- EC 2.1.1.319: type I protein arginine methyltransferase
- EC 2.1.1.320: type II protein arginine methyltransferase
- EC 2.1.1.321: type III protein arginine methyltransferase
- EC 2.1.1.322: type IV protein arginine methyltransferase
- EC 2.1.1.323: (–)-pluviatolide 4-''O''-methyltransferase
- EC 2.1.1.324: dTDP-4-amino-2,3,4,6-tetradeoxy-D-glucose N,N-dimethyltransferase
- EC 2.1.1.325: juvenile hormone-III synthase
- EC 2.1.1.326: ''N''-acetyldemethylphosphinothricin ''P''-methyltransferase
- EC 2.1.1.327: phenazine-1-carboxylate ''N''-methyltransferase
- EC 2.1.1.328: ''N''-demethylindolmycin ''N''-methyltransferase
- EC 2.1.1.329: demethylphylloquinol methyltransferase
- EC 2.1.1.330: 5′-demethylyatein 5′-''O''-methyltransferase
- EC 2.1.1.331: bacteriochlorophyllide d C-12^{1}-methyltransferase
- EC 2.1.1.332: bacteriochlorophyllide d C-8^{2}-methyltransferase
- EC 2.1.1.333: bacteriochlorophyllide ''d'' C-20 methyltransferase
- EC 2.1.1.334: methanethiol ''S''-methyltransferase
- EC 2.1.1.335: 4-amino-anhydrotetracycline N^{4}-methyltransferase
- EC 2.1.1.336: norbelladine ''O''-methyltransferase
- EC 2.1.1.337: reticuline ''N''-methyltransferase
- EC 2.1.1.338: desmethylxanthohumol 6′-''O''-methyltransferase
- EC 2.1.1.339: xanthohumol 4-''O''-methyltransferase
- EC 2.1.1.340: 3-aminomethylindole ''N'''-methyltransferase
- EC 2.1.1.341: vanillate/3-''O''-methylgallate ''O''-demethylase
- EC 2.1.1.342: anaerobilin synthase
- EC 2.1.1.343: 8-amino-8-demethylriboflavin ''N,N''-dimethyltransferase
- EC 2.1.1.344: ornithine lipid ''N''-methyltransferase
- EC 2.1.1.345: psilocybin synthase
- EC 2.1.1.346: U6 snRNA m^{6}A methyltransferase
- EC 2.1.1.347: (+)-''O''-methylkolavelool synthase
- EC 2.1.1.348: mRNA m^{6}A methyltransferase
- EC 2.1.1.349: toxoflavin synthase
- EC 2.1.1.350: menaquinone C^{8}-methyltransferase
- EC 2.1.1.351: nocamycin ''O''-methyltransferase
- EC 2.1.1.352: 3-''O''-acetyl-4′-''O''-demethylpapaveroxine 4′-''O''-methyltransferase
- EC 2.1.1.353: demethylluteothin ''O''-methyltransferase
- EC 2.1.1.354: [histone H3]-lysine^{4} N-trimethyltransferase
- EC 2.1.1.355: [histone H3]-lysine^{9} N-trimethyltransferase
- EC 2.1.1.356: [histone H3]-lysine^{27} N-trimethyltransferase
- EC 2.1.1.357: [histone H3]-lysine^{36} N-dimethyltransferase
- EC 2.1.1.358: [histone H3]-dimethyl-L-lysine^{36} N-methyltransferase. Now known to have the activity of EC 2.1.1.359, [histone H3]-lysine^{36} N-trimethyltransferase.
- EC 2.1.1.359: [histone H3]-lysine^{36} N-trimethyltransferase
- EC 2.1.1.360: [histone H3]-lysine^{79} N-trimethyltransferase
- EC 2.1.1.361: [histone H4]-lysine^{20} N-methyltransferase
- EC 2.1.1.362: [histone H4]-N-methyl-L-lysine^{20} N-methyltransferase
- EC 2.1.1.363: pre-sodorifen synthase
- EC 2.1.1.364: [histone H3]-lysine^{4} N-methyltransferase
- EC 2.1.1.365: MMP 1-''O''-methyltransferase
- EC 2.1.1.366: [histone H3]-N^{6},N^{6}-dimethyl-lysine^{9} N-methyltransferase
- EC 2.1.1.367: [histone H3]-lysine^{9} N-methyltransferase
- EC 2.1.1.368: [histone H3]-lysine^{9} N-dimethyltransferase
- EC 2.1.1.369: [histone H3]-lysine^{27} N-methyltransferase
- EC 2.1.1.370: [histone H3]-lysine^{4} N-dimethyltransferase
- EC 2.1.1.371: [histone H3]-lysine^{27} N-dimethyltransferase
- EC 2.1.1.372: [histone H4]-lysine^{20} N-trimethyltransferase
- EC 2.1.1.373: 2-hydroxy-4-(methylsulfanyl)butanoate S-methyltransferase
- EC 2.1.1.374: 2-heptyl-1-hydroxyquinolin-4(1''H'')-one methyltransferase
- EC 2.1.1.375: NNS virus cap methyltransferase
- EC 2.1.1.376: glycine betaine—corrinoid protein ''Co''-methyltransferase
- EC 2.1.1.377: [methyl-Co(III) glycine betaine-specific corrinoid protein]—coenzyme M methyltransferase
- EC 2.1.1.378: [methyl-Co(III) glycine betaine-specific corrinoid protein]—tetrahydrofolate methyltransferase
- EC 2.1.1.379: [methyl coenzyme M reductase]-L-arginine C-5-methyltransferase

=== EC 2.1.2: Hydroxymethyl-, Formyl- and Related Transferases ===
- EC 2.1.2.1: glycine hydroxymethyltransferase
- EC 2.1.2.2: phosphoribosylglycinamide formyltransferase 1
- EC 2.1.2.3: phosphoribosylaminoimidazolecarboxamide formyltransferase
- EC 2.1.2.4: glycine formimidoyltransferase
- EC 2.1.2.5: glutamate formiminotransferase
- EC 2.1.2.6: deleted, included in EC 2.1.2.5
- EC 2.1.2.7: D-alanine 2-hydroxymethyltransferase
- EC 2.1.2.8: deoxycytidylate 5-hydroxymethyltransferase
- EC 2.1.2.9: methionyl-tRNA formyltransferase
- EC 2.1.2.10: aminomethyltransferase
- EC 2.1.2.11: 3-methyl-2-oxobutanoate hydroxymethyltransferase
- EC 2.1.2.12: now EC 2.1.1.74
- EC 2.1.2.13: UDP-4-amino-4-deoxy-L-arabinose formyltransferase
- EC 2.1.2.14: GDP-perosamine N-formyltransferase

=== EC 2.1.3: Carboxy- and Carbamoyltransferases ===
- EC 2.1.3.1: methylmalonyl-CoA carboxytransferase
- EC 2.1.3.2: aspartate carbamoyltransferase
- EC 2.1.3.3: ornithine carbamoyltransferase
- EC 2.1.3.4: deleted
- EC 2.1.3.5: oxamate carbamoyltransferase
- EC 2.1.3.6: putrescine carbamoyltransferase
- EC 2.1.3.7: 3-hydroxymethylcephem carbamoyltransferase
- EC 2.1.3.8: lysine carbamoyltransferase
- EC 2.1.3.9: N-acetylornithine carbamoyltransferase
- EC 2.1.3.10: malonyl-S-ACP:biotin-protein carboxyltransferase
- EC 2.1.3.11: N-succinylornithine carbamoyltransferase
- EC 2.1.3.13: The enzyme has been replaced by EC 6.1.2.2
- EC 2.1.3.14: The enzyme has been replaced by EC 6.1.2.2
- EC 2.1.3.15: acetyl-CoA carboxytransferase

=== EC 2.1.4: Amidinotransferases ===
- EC 2.1.4.1: glycine amidinotransferase
- EC 2.1.4.2: scyllo-inosamine-4-phosphate amidinotransferase
- EC 2.1.4.3: L-arginine:L-lysine amidinotransferase

=== EC 2.1.5: Methylenetransferases ===
- EC 2.1.5.1: sesamin methylene transferase

== EC 2.2: Transferring Aldehyde or Ketonic Groups ==
=== EC 2.2.1: Transketolases and Transaldolases ===
- EC 2.2.1.1: transketolase
- EC 2.2.1.2: transaldolase
- EC 2.2.1.3: formaldehyde transketolase
- EC 2.2.1.4: acetoin—ribose-5-phosphate transaldolase
- EC 2.2.1.5: 2-hydroxy-3-oxoadipate synthase
- EC 2.2.1.6: acetolactate synthase
- EC 2.2.1.7: 1-deoxy-D-xylulose-5-phosphate synthase
- EC 2.2.1.8: fluorothreonine transaldolase
- EC 2.2.1.9: 2-succinyl-5-enolpyruvyl-6-hydroxy-3-cyclohexene-1-carboxylic-acid synthase
- EC 2.2.1.10: 2-amino-3,7-dideoxy-D-threo-hept-6-ulosonate synthase
- EC 2.2.1.11: 6-deoxy-5-ketofructose 1-phosphate synthase
- EC 2.2.1.12: 3-acetyloctanal synthase
- EC 2.2.1.13: apulose-4-phosphate transketolase
- EC 2.2.1.14: 6-deoxy-6-sulfo-D-fructose transaldolase
- EC 2.2.1.15: 6-deoxy-6-sulfo-D-fructose transketolase

== EC 2.3: Acyltransferases ==
=== EC 2.3.1: Transferring groups other than amino-acyl groups ===
- EC 2.3.1.1: amino-acid N-acetyltransferase
- EC 2.3.1.2: imidazole N-acetyltransferase
- EC 2.3.1.3: glucosamine N-acetyltransferase
- EC 2.3.1.4: glucosamine-phosphate N-acetyltransferase
- EC 2.3.1.5: arylamine N-acetyltransferase
- EC 2.3.1.6: choline O-acetyltransferase
- EC 2.3.1.7: carnitine O-acetyltransferase
- EC 2.3.1.8: phosphate acetyltransferase
- EC 2.3.1.9: acetyl-CoA C-acetyltransferase
- EC 2.3.1.10: hydrogen-sulfide S-acetyltransferase
- EC 2.3.1.11: thioethanolamine S-acetyltransferase
- EC 2.3.1.12: dihydrolipoyllysine-residue acetyltransferase
- EC 2.3.1.13: glycine N-acyltransferase
- EC 2.3.1.14: glutamine N-phenylacetyltransferase
- EC 2.3.1.15: glycerol-3-phosphate O-acyltransferase
- EC 2.3.1.16: acetyl-CoA C-acyltransferase
- EC 2.3.1.17: aspartate N-acetyltransferase
- EC 2.3.1.18: galactoside O-acetyltransferase
- EC 2.3.1.19: phosphate butyryltransferase
- EC 2.3.1.20: diacylglycerol O-acyltransferase
- EC 2.3.1.21: carnitine O-palmitoyltransferase
- EC 2.3.1.22: 2-acylglycerol O-acyltransferase
- EC 2.3.1.23: 1-acylglycerophosphocholine O-acyltransferase
- EC 2.3.1.24: sphingosine N-acyltransferase
- EC 2.3.1.25: plasmalogen synthase
- EC 2.3.1.26: sterol O-acyltransferase
- EC 2.3.1.27: cortisol O-acetyltransferase
- EC 2.3.1.28: chloramphenicol O-acetyltransferase
- EC 2.3.1.29: glycine C-acetyltransferase
- EC 2.3.1.30: serine O-acetyltransferase
- EC 2.3.1.31: homoserine O-acetyltransferase
- EC 2.3.1.32: lysine N-acetyltransferase
- EC 2.3.1.33: histidine N-acetyltransferase
- EC 2.3.1.34: D-tryptophan N-acetyltransferase
- EC 2.3.1.35: glutamate N-acetyltransferase
- EC 2.3.1.36: D-amino-acid N-acetyltransferase
- EC 2.3.1.37: 5-aminolevulinate synthase
- EC 2.3.1.38: [acyl-carrier-protein] S-acetyltransferase
- EC 2.3.1.39: [acyl-carrier-protein] S-malonyltransferase
- EC 2.3.1.40: acyl-[acyl-carrier-protein]—phospholipid O-acyltransferase
- EC 2.3.1.41: β-ketoacyl-[acyl-carrier-protein] synthase I
- EC 2.3.1.42: glycerone-phosphate O-acyltransferase
- EC 2.3.1.43: phosphatidylcholine—sterol O-acyltransferase
- EC 2.3.1.44: N-acetylneuraminate 4-O-acetyltransferase
- EC 2.3.1.45: N-acetylneuraminate 7-O(or 9-O)-acetyltransferase
- EC 2.3.1.46: homoserine O-succinyltransferase
- EC 2.3.1.47: 8-amino-7-oxononanoate synthase
- EC 2.3.1.48: histone acetyltransferase
- EC 2.3.1.49: deacetyl-(citrate-(pro-3S)-lyase) S-acetyltransferase
- EC 2.3.1.50: serine C-palmitoyltransferase
- EC 2.3.1.51: 1-acylglycerol-3-phosphate O-acyltransferase
- EC 2.3.1.52: 2-acylglycerol-3-phosphate O-acyltransferase
- EC 2.3.1.53: phenylalanine N-acetyltransferase
- EC 2.3.1.54: formate C-acetyltransferase
- EC 2.3.1.55: identical to EC 2.3.1.82
- EC 2.3.1.56: aromatic-hydroxylamine O-acetyltransferase
- EC 2.3.1.57: diamine N-acetyltransferase
- EC 2.3.1.58: 2,3-diaminopropionate N-oxalyltransferase
- EC 2.3.1.59: gentamicin 2′-N-acetyltransferase
- EC 2.3.1.60: gentamicin 3′-N-acetyltransferase
- EC 2.3.1.61: dihydrolipoyllysine-residue succinyltransferase
- EC 2.3.1.62: 2-acylglycerophosphocholine O-acyltransferase
- EC 2.3.1.63: 1-alkylglycerophosphocholine O-acyltransferase
- EC 2.3.1.64: agmatine N^{4}-coumaroyltransferase
- EC 2.3.1.65: bile acid-CoA:amino acid N-acyltransferase
- EC 2.3.1.66: leucine N-acetyltransferase
- EC 2.3.1.67: 1-alkylglycerophosphocholine O-acetyltransferase
- EC 2.3.1.68: glutamine N-acyltransferase
- EC 2.3.1.69: monoterpenol O-acetyltransferase
- EC 2.3.1.70: deleted
- EC 2.3.1.71: glycine N-benzoyltransferase
- EC 2.3.1.72: indoleacetylglucose—inositol O-acyltransferase
- EC 2.3.1.73: diacylglycerol—sterol O-acyltransferase
- EC 2.3.1.74: chalcone synthase
- EC 2.3.1.75: long-chain-alcohol O-fatty-acyltransferase
- EC 2.3.1.76: retinol O-fatty-acyltransferase
- EC 2.3.1.77: triacylglycerol—sterol O-acyltransferase
- EC 2.3.1.78: heparan-α-glucosaminide N-acetyltransferase
- EC 2.3.1.79: maltose O-acetyltransferase
- EC 2.3.1.80: cysteine-S-conjugate N-acetyltransferase
- EC 2.3.1.81: aminoglycoside 3-N-acetyltransferase
- EC 2.3.1.82: aminoglycoside 6′-N-acetyltransferase
- EC 2.3.1.83: phosphatidylcholine—dolichol O-acyltransferase
- EC 2.3.1.84: alcohol O-acetyltransferase
- EC 2.3.1.85: fatty-acid synthase system
- EC 2.3.1.86: fatty-acyl-CoA synthase system
- EC 2.3.1.87: aralkylamine N-acetyltransferase
- EC 2.3.1.88: Now covered by EC 2.3.1.254, EC 2.3.1.255, EC 2.3.1.256, EC 2.3.1.257, EC 2.3.1.258 and EC 2.3.1.259
- EC 2.3.1.89: tetrahydrodipicolinate N-acetyltransferase
- EC 2.3.1.90: β-glucogallin O-galloyltransferase
- EC 2.3.1.91: sinapoylglucose—choline O-sinapoyltransferase
- EC 2.3.1.92: sinapoylglucose—malate O-sinapoyltransferase
- EC 2.3.1.93: 13-hydroxylupinine O-tigloyltransferase
- EC 2.3.1.94: 6-deoxyerythronolide-B synthase
- EC 2.3.1.95: trihydroxystilbene synthase
- EC 2.3.1.96: glycoprotein N-palmitoyltransferase
- EC 2.3.1.97: glycylpeptide N-tetradecanoyltransferase
- EC 2.3.1.98: chlorogenate—glucarate O-hydroxycinnamoyltransferase
- EC 2.3.1.99: quinate O-hydroxycinnamoyltransferase
- EC 2.3.1.100: [myelin-proteolipid] O-palmitoyltransferase
- EC 2.3.1.101: formylmethanofuran—tetrahydromethanopterin N-formyltransferase
- EC 2.3.1.102: N^{6}-hydroxylysine O-acetyltransferase
- EC 2.3.1.103: sinapoylglucose—sinapoylglucose O-sinapoyltransferase
- EC 2.3.1.104: The activity is covered by EC 2.3.1.25
- EC 2.3.1.105: alkylglycerophosphate 2-O-acetyltransferase
- EC 2.3.1.106: tartronate O-hydroxycinnamoyltransferase
- EC 2.3.1.107: deacetylvindoline O-acetyltransferase
- EC 2.3.1.108: α-tubulin N-acetyltransferase
- EC 2.3.1.109: arginine N-succinyltransferase
- EC 2.3.1.110: tyramine N-feruloyltransferase
- EC 2.3.1.111: mycocerosate synthase
- EC 2.3.1.112: D-tryptophan N-malonyltransferase
- EC 2.3.1.113: anthranilate N-malonyltransferase
- EC 2.3.1.114: 3,4-dichloroaniline N-malonyltransferase
- EC 2.3.1.115: isoflavone-7-O-β-glucoside 6′′-O-malonyltransferase
- EC 2.3.1.116: flavonol-3-O-β-glucoside O-malonyltransferase
- EC 2.3.1.117: 2,3,4,5-tetrahydropyridine-2,6-dicarboxylate N-succinyltransferase
- EC 2.3.1.118: N-hydroxyarylamine O-acetyltransferase
- EC 2.3.1.119: Now covered by EC 2.3.1.199, EC 1.1.1.330, EC 4.2.1.134 and EC 1.3.1.93
- EC 2.3.1.120: The reaction is due to EC 2.3.1.74
- EC 2.3.1.121: 1-alkenylglycerophosphoethanolamine O-acyltransferase
- EC 2.3.1.122: trehalose O-mycolyltransferase
- EC 2.3.1.123: dolichol O-acyltransferase
- EC 2.3.1.124: Already listed as EC 2.3.1.20
- EC 2.3.1.125: 1-alkyl-2-acetylglycerol O-acyltransferase
- EC 2.3.1.126: isocitrate O-dihydroxycinnamoyltransferase
- EC 2.3.1.127: ornithine N-benzoyltransferase
- EC 2.3.1.128: now classified as EC 2.3.1.266 and EC 2.3.1.267
- EC 2.3.1.129: acyl-[acyl-carrier-protein]—UDP-N-acetylglucosamine O-acyltransferase
- EC 2.3.1.130: galactarate O-hydroxycinnamoyltransferase
- EC 2.3.1.131: glucarate O-hydroxycinnamoyltransferase
- EC 2.3.1.132: glucarolactone O-hydroxycinnamoyltransferase
- EC 2.3.1.133: shikimate O-hydroxycinnamoyltransferase
- EC 2.3.1.134: galactolipid O-acyltransferase
- EC 2.3.1.135: phosphatidylcholine—retinol O-acyltransferase
- EC 2.3.1.136: polysialic-acid O-acetyltransferase
- EC 2.3.1.137: carnitine O-octanoyltransferase
- EC 2.3.1.138: putrescine N-hydroxycinnamoyltransferase
- EC 2.3.1.139: ecdysone O-acyltransferase
- EC 2.3.1.140: rosmarinate synthase
- EC 2.3.1.141: galactosylacylglycerol O-acyltransferase
- EC 2.3.1.142: glycoprotein O-fatty-acyltransferase
- EC 2.3.1.143: β-glucogallin—tetrakisgalloylglucose O-galloyltransferase
- EC 2.3.1.144: anthranilate N-benzoyltransferase
- EC 2.3.1.145: piperidine N-piperoyltransferase
- EC 2.3.1.146: pinosylvin synthase
- EC 2.3.1.147: glycerophospholipid arachidonoyl-transferase (CoA-independent)
- EC 2.3.1.148: glycerophospholipid acyltransferase (CoA-dependent)
- EC 2.3.1.149: platelet-activating factor acetyltransferase
- EC 2.3.1.150: salutaridinol 7-O-acetyltransferase
- EC 2.3.1.151: 2,3′,4,6-tetrahydroxybenzophenone synthase
- EC 2.3.1.152: alcohol O-cinnamoyltransferase
- EC 2.3.1.153: anthocyanin 5-(6′′′-hydroxycinnamoyltransferase)
- EC 2.3.1.154: Now EC 2.3.1.176
- EC 2.3.1.155: acetyl-CoA C-myristoyltransferase
- EC 2.3.1.156: phloroisovalerophenone synthase
- EC 2.3.1.157: glucosamine-1-phosphate N-acetyltransferase
- EC 2.3.1.158: phospholipid:diacylglycerol acyltransferase
- EC 2.3.1.159: acridone synthase
- EC 2.3.1.160: vinorine synthase
- EC 2.3.1.161: lovastatin nonaketide synthase
- EC 2.3.1.162: taxadien-5α-ol O-acetyltransferase
- EC 2.3.1.163: 10-hydroxytaxane O-acetyltransferase
- EC 2.3.1.164: isopenicillin-N N-acyltransferase
- EC 2.3.1.165: 6-methylsalicylic acid synthase
- EC 2.3.1.166: 2α-hydroxytaxane 2-O-benzoyltransferase
- EC 2.3.1.167: 10-deacetylbaccatin III 10-O-acetyltransferase
- EC 2.3.1.168: dihydrolipoyllysine-residue (2-methylpropanoyl)transferase
- EC 2.3.1.169: CO-methylating acetyl-CoA synthase
- EC 2.3.1.170: 6′-deoxychalcone synthase
- EC 2.3.1.171: anthocyanin 6′′-O-malonyltransferase
- EC 2.3.1.172: anthocyanin 5-O-glucoside 6′′′-O-malonyltransferase
- EC 2.3.1.173: flavonol-3-O-triglucoside O-coumaroyltransferase
- EC 2.3.1.174: 3-oxoadipyl-CoA thiolase
- EC 2.3.1.175: deacetylcephalosporin-C acetyltransferase
- EC 2.3.1.176: propanoyl-CoA C-acyltransferase
- EC 2.3.1.177: 3,5-dihydroxybiphenyl synthase
- EC 2.3.1.178: diaminobutyrate acetyltransferase
- EC 2.3.1.179: β-ketoacyl-[acyl-carrier-protein] synthase II
- EC 2.3.1.180: β-ketoacyl-[acyl-carrier-protein] synthase III
- EC 2.3.1.181: lipoyl(octanoyl) transferase
- EC 2.3.1.182: Now covered by EC 2.3.3.21
- EC 2.3.1.183: phosphinothricin acetyltransferase
- EC 2.3.1.184: acyl-homoserine-lactone synthase
- EC 2.3.1.185: tropine acyltransferase
- EC 2.3.1.186: pseudotropine acyltransferase
- EC 2.3.1.187: acetyl-S-ACP:malonate ACP transferase
- EC 2.3.1.188: ω-hydroxypalmitate O-feruloyl transferase
- EC 2.3.1.189: mycothiol synthase
- EC 2.3.1.190: acetoin dehydrogenase
- EC 2.3.1.191: UDP-3-O-(3-hydroxyacyl)glucosamine N-acyltransferase
- EC 2.3.1.192: glycine N-phenylacetyltransferase
- EC 2.3.1.193: tRNA^{Met}cytidine acetyltransferase
- EC 2.3.1.194: acetoacetyl-CoA synthase
- EC 2.3.1.195: (Z)-3-hexen-1-ol acetyltransferase
- EC 2.3.1.196: benzyl alcohol O-benzoyltransferase
- EC 2.3.1.197: dTDP-3-amino-3,6-dideoxy-α-D-galactopyranose 3-N-acetyltransferase
- EC 2.3.1.198: glycerol-3-phosphate 2-O-acyltransferase
- EC 2.3.1.199: very-long-chain 3-oxoacyl-CoA synthase
- EC 2.3.1.200: lipoyl amidotransferase
- EC 2.3.1.201: UDP-2-acetamido-3-amino-2,3-dideoxy-glucuronate N-acetyltransferase
- EC 2.3.1.202: UDP-4-amino-4,6-dideoxy-N-acetyl-β-L-altrosamine N-acetyltransferase
- EC 2.3.1.203: UDP-N-acetylbacillosamine N-acetyltransferase
- EC 2.3.1.204: octanoyl-[GcvH]:protein N-octanoyltransferase
- EC 2.3.1.205: fumigaclavine B O-acetyltransferase
- EC 2.3.1.206: 3,5,7-trioxododecanoyl-CoA synthase
- EC 2.3.1.207: β-ketodecanoyl-[acyl-carrier-protein] synthase
- EC 2.3.1.208: 4-hydroxycoumarin synthase
- EC 2.3.1.209: dTDP-4-amino-4,6-dideoxy-D-glucose acyltransferase
- EC 2.3.1.210: dTDP-4-amino-4,6-dideoxy-D-galactose acyltransferase
- EC 2.3.1.211: bisdemethoxycurcumin synthase
- EC 2.3.1.212: benzalacetone synthase
- EC 2.3.1.213: cyanidin 3-O-(6-O-glucosyl-2-O-xylosylgalactoside) 6′′′-O-hydroxycinnamoyltransferase
- EC 2.3.1.214: pelargonidin 3-O-(6-caffeoylglucoside) 5-O-(6-O-malonylglucoside) 4′′′-malonyltransferase
- EC 2.3.1.215: anthocyanin 3-O-glucoside 6''-O-hydroxycinnamoyltransferase
- EC 2.3.1.216: 5,7-dihydroxy-2-methylchromone synthase
- EC 2.3.1.217: curcumin synthase
- EC 2.3.1.218: phenylpropanoylacetyl-CoA synthase
- EC 2.3.1.219: demethoxycurcumin synthase
- EC 2.3.1.220: 2,4,6-trihydroxybenzophenone synthase
- EC 2.3.1.221: noranthrone synthase
- EC 2.3.1.222: phosphate propanoyltransferase
- EC 2.3.1.223: 3-oxo-5,6-didehydrosuberyl-CoA thiolase
- EC 2.3.1.224: acetyl-CoA-benzylalcohol acetyltransferase
- EC 2.3.1.225: protein S-acyltransferase
- EC 2.3.1.226: carboxymethylproline synthase
- EC 2.3.1.227: GDP-perosamine N-acetyltransferase
- EC 2.3.1.228: isovaleryl-homoserine lactone synthase
- EC 2.3.1.229: 4-coumaroyl-homoserine lactone synthase
- EC 2.3.1.230: 2-heptyl-4(1H)-quinolone synthase
- EC 2.3.1.231: tRNA^{Phe} {7-[3-amino-3-(methoxycarbonyl)propyl]wyosine^{37} -N}-methoxycarbonyltransferase
- EC 2.3.1.232: methanol O-anthraniloyltransferase
- EC 2.3.1.233: 1,3,6,8-tetrahydroxynaphthalene synthase
- EC 2.3.1.234: N^{6}-L-threonylcarbamoyladenine synthase
- EC 2.3.1.235: tetracenomycin F2 synthase
- EC 2.3.1.236: 5-methylnaphthoic acid synthase
- EC 2.3.1.237: neocarzinostatin naphthoate synthase
- EC 2.3.1.238: monacolin J acid methylbutanoate transferase
- EC 2.3.1.239: 10-deoxymethynolide synthase
- EC 2.3.1.240: narbonolide synthase
- EC 2.3.1.241: Kdo2-lipid IVA lauroyltransferase
- EC 2.3.1.242: Kdo2-lipid IVA palmitoleoyltransferase
- EC 2.3.1.243: lauroyl-Kdo2-lipid IVA myristoyltransferase
- EC 2.3.1.244: 2-methylbutanoate polyketide synthase
- EC 2.3.1.245: 3-hydroxy-5-phosphooxypentane-2,4-dione thiolase
- EC 2.3.1.246: 3,5-dihydroxyphenylacetyl-CoA synthase
- EC 2.3.1.247: 3-keto-5-aminohexanoate cleavage enzyme
- EC 2.3.1.248: spermidine disinapoyl transferase
- EC 2.3.1.249: spermidine dicoumaroyl transferase
- EC 2.3.1.250: [Wnt protein] O-palmitoleoyl transferase
- EC 2.3.1.251: lipid IVA palmitoyltransferase
- EC 2.3.1.252: mycolipanoate synthase
- EC 2.3.1.253: phloroglucinol synthase
- EC 2.3.1.254: N-terminal methionine N^{α}-acetyltransferase NatB
- EC 2.3.1.255: N-terminal amino-acid N^{α}-acetyltransferase NatA
- EC 2.3.1.256: N-terminal methionine N^{α}-acetyltransferase NatC
- EC 2.3.1.257: N-terminal L-serine N^{α}-acetyltransferase NatD
- EC 2.3.1.258: N-terminal methionine N^{α}-acetyltransferase NatE
- EC 2.3.1.259: N-terminal methionine N^{α}-acetyltransferase NatF
- EC 2.3.1.260: tetracycline polyketide synthase
- EC 2.3.1.261: (4-hydroxyphenyl)alkanoate synthase
- EC 2.3.1.262: anthraniloyl-CoA anthraniloyltransferase
- EC 2.3.1.263: 2-amino-4-oxopentanoate thiolase
- EC 2.3.1.264: β-lysine N^{6}-acetyltransferase
- EC 2.3.1.265: phosphatidylinositol dimannoside acyltransferase
- EC 2.3.1.266: [ribosomal protein S18]-alanine N-acetyltransferase
- EC 2.3.1.267: [ribosomal protein S5]-alanine N-acetyltransferase
- EC 2.3.1.268: ethanol O-acetyltransferase
- EC 2.3.1.269: apolipoprotein N-acyltransferase
- EC 2.3.1.270: lyso-ornithine lipid O-acyltransferase
- EC 2.3.1.271: L-glutamate-5-semialdehyde N-acetyltransferase
- EC 2.3.1.272: 2-acetylphloroglucinol acetyltransferase
- EC 2.3.1.273: diglucosylglycerate octanoyltransferase
- EC 2.3.1.274: phosphate acyltransferase
- EC 2.3.1.275: acyl phosphate:glycerol-3-phosphate acyltransferase
- EC 2.3.1.276: galactosamine-1-phosphate N-acetyltransferase
- EC 2.3.1.277: 2-oxo-3-(phosphooxy)propyl 3-oxoalkanoate synthase
- EC 2.3.1.278: mycolipenoyl-CoA—2-(long-chain-fatty acyl)-trehalose mycolipenoyltransferase
- EC 2.3.1.279: long-chain-acyl-CoA—trehalose acyltransferase
- EC 2.3.1.280: (aminoalkyl)phosphonate N-acetyltransferase
- EC 2.3.1.281: 5-hydroxydodecatetraenal polyketide synthase
- EC 2.3.1.282: phenolphthiocerol/phthiocerol/phthiodiolone dimycocerosyl transferase
- EC 2.3.1.283: 2′-acyl-2-O-sulfo-trehalose (hydroxy)phthioceranyltransferase
- EC 2.3.1.284: 3′-(hydroxy)phthioceranyl-2′-palmitoyl(stearoyl)-2-O-sulfo-trehalose (hydroxy)phthioceranyltransferase
- EC 2.3.1.285: (13S,14R)-1,13-dihydroxy-N-methylcanadine 13-O-acetyltransferase
- EC 2.3.1.286: protein acetyllysine N-acetyltransferase
- EC 2.3.1.287: phthioceranic/hydroxyphthioceranic acid synthase
- EC 2.3.1.288: 2-O-sulfo trehalose long-chain-acyltransferase
- EC 2.3.1.289: aureothin polyketide synthase system
- EC 2.3.1.290: spectinabilin polyketide synthase system
- EC 2.3.1.291: sphingoid base N-palmitoyltransferase
- EC 2.3.1.292: (phenol)carboxyphthiodiolenone synthase
- EC 2.3.1.293: meromycolic acid 3-oxoacyl-(acyl carrier protein) synthase I
- EC 2.3.1.294: meromycolic acid 3-oxoacyl-(acyl carrier protein) synthase II
- EC 2.3.1.295: mycoketide-CoA synthase
- EC 2.3.1.296: ω-hydroxyceramide transacylase
- EC 2.3.1.297: very-long-chain ceramide synthase
- EC 2.3.1.298: ultra-long-chain ceramide synthase
- EC 2.3.1.299: sphingoid base N-stearoyltransferase
- EC 2.3.1.300: branched-chain β-ketoacyl-[acyl-carrier-protein] synthase
- EC 2.3.1.301: mycobacterial β-ketoacyl-[acyl carrier protein] synthase III
- EC 2.3.1.302: hydroxycinnamoyl-CoA:5-hydroxyanthranilate N-hydroxycinnamoyltransferase
- EC 2.3.1.303: α-L-Rha-(1→2)-α-D-Man-(1→2)-α-D-Man-(1→3)-α-D-Gal-PP-Und 2IV-O-acetyltransferase
- EC 2.3.1.304: poly[(S)-3-hydroxyalkanoate] polymerase

=== EC 2.3.2: Aminoacyltransferases ===
- EC 2.3.2.1: D-glutamyltransferase
- EC 2.3.2.2: γ-glutamyltransferase
- EC 2.3.2.3: lysyltransferase
- EC 2.3.2.4: Now classified as EC 4.3.2.9, γ-glutamylcyclotransferase
- EC 2.3.2.5: glutaminyl-peptide cyclotransferase
- EC 2.3.2.6: leucyltransferase
- EC 2.3.2.7: aspartyltransferase
- EC 2.3.2.8: arginyltransferase
- EC 2.3.2.9: agaritine γ-glutamyltransferase
- EC 2.3.2.10: UDP-N-acetylmuramoylpentapeptide-lysine N^{6}-alanyltransferase
- EC 2.3.2.11: alanylphosphatidylglycerol synthase
- EC 2.3.2.12: peptidyltransferase
- EC 2.3.2.13: protein-glutamine g-glutamyltransferase
- EC 2.3.2.14: D-alanine γ-glutamyltransferase
- EC 2.3.2.15: glutathione γ-glutamylcysteinyltransferase
- EC 2.3.2.16: lipid II:glycine glycyltransferase
- EC 2.3.2.17: N-acetylmuramoyl-L-alanyl-D-glutamyl-L-lysyl-(N^{6}-glycyl)-D-alanyl-D-alanine-diphosphoundecaprenyl-N-acetylglucosamine:glycine glycyltransferase
- EC 2.3.2.18: N-acetylmuramoyl-L-alanyl-D-glutamyl-L-lysyl-(N^{6}-triglycine)-D-alanyl-D-alanine-diphosphoundecaprenyl-N-acetylglucosamine:glycine glycyltransferase
- EC 2.3.2.19: ribostamycin:4-(γ-L-glutamylamino)-(S)-2-hydroxybutanoyl-[BtrI acyl-carrier protein] 4-(γ-L-glutamylamino)-(S)-2-hydroxybutanoate transferase
- EC 2.3.2.20: cyclo(L-leucyl-L-phenylalanyl) synthase
- EC 2.3.2.21: cyclo(L-tyrosyl-L-tyrosyl) synthase
- EC 2.3.2.22: cyclo(L-leucyl-L-leucyl) synthase
- EC 2.3.2.23: E2 ubiquitin-conjugating enzyme
- EC 2.3.2.24: (E3-independent) E2 ubiquitin-conjugating enzyme
- EC 2.3.2.25: N-terminal E2 ubiquitin-conjugating enzyme
- EC 2.3.2.26: HECT-type E3 ubiquitin transferase
- EC 2.3.2.27: RING-type E3 ubiquitin transferase
- EC 2.3.2.28: L-allo-isoleucyltransferase
- EC 2.3.2.29: aspartate/glutamate leucyltransferase
- EC 2.3.2.30: L-ornithine N^{α}-acyltransferase
- EC 2.3.2.31: RBR-type E3 ubiquitin transferase
- EC 2.3.2.32: cullin-RING-type E3 NEDD8 transferase
- EC 2.3.2.33: RCR-type E3 ubiquitin transferase
- EC 2.3.2.34: E2 NEDD8-conjugating enzyme
- EC 2.3.2.35: capsaicin synthase
- EC 2.3.2.36: RING-type E3 ubiquitin transferase (cysteine targeting)

=== EC 2.3.3: Acyl groups converted into alkyl on transfer ===
- EC 2.3.3.1: citrate (Si)-synthase
- EC 2.3.3.2: decylcitrate synthase
- EC 2.3.3.3: citrate (Re)-synthase
- EC 2.3.3.4: decylhomocitrate synthase
- EC 2.3.3.5: 2-methylcitrate synthase
- EC 2.3.3.6: 2-ethylmalate synthase
- EC 2.3.3.7: 3-ethylmalate synthase
- EC 2.3.3.8: ATP citrate synthase
- EC 2.3.3.9: malate synthase
- EC 2.3.3.10: hydroxymethylglutaryl-CoA synthase
- EC 2.3.3.11: 2-hydroxyglutarate synthase
- EC 2.3.3.12: 3-propylmalate synthase
- EC 2.3.3.13: 2-isopropylmalate synthase
- EC 2.3.3.14: homocitrate synthase
- EC 2.3.3.15: sulfoacetaldehyde acetyltransferase
- EC 2.3.3.16: citrate synthase (unknown stereospecificity)
- EC 2.3.3.17: methylthioalkylmalate synthase
- EC 2.3.3.18: 2-phosphinomethylmalate synthase
- EC 2.3.3.19: 2-phosphonomethylmalate synthase
- EC 2.3.3.20: acyl-CoA:acyl-CoA alkyltransferase

== EC 2.4: Glycosyltransferases ==
=== EC 2.4.1: Hexosyltransferases ===
- EC 2.4.1.1: Glycogen phosphorylase
- EC 2.4.1.2: dextrin dextranase
- EC 2.4.1.3: deleted, included in EC 2.4.1.25
- EC 2.4.1.4: amylosucrase
- EC 2.4.1.5: dextransucrase
- EC 2.4.1.6: deleted
- EC 2.4.1.7: sucrose phosphorylase
- EC 2.4.1.8: maltose phosphorylase
- EC 2.4.1.9: inulosucrase
- EC 2.4.1.10: levansucrase
- EC 2.4.1.11: glycogen(starch) synthase
- EC 2.4.1.12: cellulose synthase (UDP-forming)
- EC 2.4.1.13: sucrose synthase
- EC 2.4.1.14: sucrose-phosphate synthase
- EC 2.4.1.15: α,α-trehalose-phosphate synthase (UDP-forming)
- EC 2.4.1.16: chitin synthase
- EC 2.4.1.17: glucuronosyltransferase
- EC 2.4.1.18: ,4-α-glucan branching enzyme
- EC 2.4.1.19: cyclomaltodextrin glucanotransferase
- EC 2.4.1.20: cellobiose phosphorylase
- EC 2.4.1.21: starch synthase
- EC 2.4.1.22: lactose synthase
- EC 2.4.1.23: sphingosine β-galactosyltransferase
- EC 2.4.1.24: 1,4-α-glucan 6-α-glucosyltransferase
- EC 2.4.1.25: 4-α-glucanotransferase
- EC 2.4.1.26: DNA α-glucosyltransferase
- EC 2.4.1.27: DNA β-glucosyltransferase
- EC 2.4.1.28: glucosyl-DNA β-glucosyltransferase
- EC 2.4.1.29: cellulose synthase (GDP-forming)
- EC 2.4.1.30: 1,3-β-oligoglucan phosphorylase
- EC 2.4.1.31: laminaribiose phosphorylase
- EC 2.4.1.32: glucomannan 4-β-mannosyltransferase
- EC 2.4.1.33: mannuronan synthase
- EC 2.4.1.34: 1,3-β-glucan synthase
- EC 2.4.1.35: phenol β-glucosyltransferase
- EC 2.4.1.36: α,α-trehalose-phosphate synthase (GDP-forming)
- EC 2.4.1.37: fucosylgalactoside 3-α-galactosyltransferase
- EC 2.4.1.38: β-N-acetylglucosaminylglycopeptide β-1,4-galactosyltransferase
- EC 2.4.1.39: steroid N-acetylglucosaminyltransferase
- EC 2.4.1.40: glycoprotein-fucosylgalactoside α-N-acetylgalactosaminyltransferase
- EC 2.4.1.41: polypeptide N-acetylgalactosaminyltransferase
- EC 2.4.1.42: deleted, included in EC 2.4.1.17
- EC 2.4.1.43: polygalacturonate 4-α-galacturonosyltransferase
- EC 2.4.1.44: lipopolysaccharide 3-α-galactosyltransferase
- EC 2.4.1.45: now included with EC 2.4.1.47, N-acylsphingosine galactosyltransferase
- EC 2.4.1.46: monogalactosyldiacylglycerol synthase
- EC 2.4.1.47: N-acylsphingosine galactosyltransferase
- EC 2.4.1.48: heteroglycan α-mannosyltransferase
- EC 2.4.1.49: cellodextrin phosphorylase
- EC 2.4.1.50: procollagen galactosyltransferase
- EC 2.4.1.51: now covered by EC 2.4.1.101, EC 2.4.1.143, EC 2.4.1.144 and EC 2.4.1.145
- EC 2.4.1.52: poly(glycerol-phosphate) α-glucosyltransferase
- EC 2.4.1.53: poly(ribitol-phosphate) β-glucosyltransferase
- EC 2.4.1.54: undecaprenyl-phosphate mannosyltransferase
- EC 2.4.1.55: Now EC 2.7.8.14, CDP-ribitol ribitolphosphotransferase
- EC 2.4.1.56: lipopolysaccharide N-acetylglucosaminyltransferase
- EC 2.4.1.57: Newer studies have shown that this is catalysed by two independent activities now covered by EC 2.4.1.345, phosphatidyl-myo-inositol α-mannosyl transferase and EC 2.4.1.346, phosphatidyl-myo-inositol dimannoside synthase
- EC 2.4.1.58: lipopolysaccharide glucosyltransferase I
- EC 2.4.1.59: deleted, included in EC 2.4.1.17
- EC 2.4.1.60: CDP-abequose:α-D-Man-(1→4)-α-L-Rha-(1→3)-α-D-Gal-PP-Und α-1,3-abequosyltransferase
- EC 2.4.1.61: deleted, included in EC 2.4.1.17
- EC 2.4.1.62: ganglioside galactosyltransferase
- EC 2.4.1.63: linamarin synthase
- EC 2.4.1.64: α,α-trehalose phosphorylase
- EC 2.4.1.65: 3-galactosyl-N-acetylglucosaminide 4-α-L-fucosyltransferase
- EC 2.4.1.66: procollagen glucosyltransferase
- EC 2.4.1.67: galactinol—raffinose galactosyltransferase
- EC 2.4.1.68: glycoprotein 6-α-L-fucosyltransferase
- EC 2.4.1.69: type 1 galactoside α-(1,2)-fucosyltransferase
- EC 2.4.1.70: poly(ribitol-phosphate) α-N-acetylglucosaminyltransferase
- EC 2.4.1.71: arylamine glucosyltransferase
- EC 2.4.1.72: now EC 2.4.2.24, 1,4-β-D-xylan synthase
- EC 2.4.1.73: lipopolysaccharide glucosyltransferase II
- EC 2.4.1.74: glycosaminoglycan galactosyltransferase
- EC 2.4.1.75: deleted entry, insufficient evidence to conclude that this is a different enzyme from EC 2.4.1.43
- EC 2.4.1.76: deleted, included in EC 2.4.1.17
- EC 2.4.1.77: deleted, included in EC 2.4.1.17
- EC 2.4.1.78: phosphopolyprenol glucosyltransferase
- EC 2.4.1.79: globotriaosylceramide 3-β-N-acetylgalactosaminyltransferase
- EC 2.4.1.80: ceramide glucosyltransferase
- EC 2.4.1.81: flavone 7-O-β-glucosyltransferase
- EC 2.4.1.82: galactinol—sucrose galactosyltransferase
- EC 2.4.1.83: dolichyl-phosphate β-D -mannosyltransferase
- EC 2.4.1.84: deleted, included in EC 2.4.1.17
- EC 2.4.1.85: cyanohydrin β-glucosyltransferase
- EC 2.4.1.86: N-acetyl-β-D-glucosaminide β-(1,3)-galactosyltransferase
- EC 2.4.1.87: N-acetyllactosaminide 3-α-galactosyltransferase
- EC 2.4.1.88: globoside α-N-acetylgalactosaminyltransferase
- EC 2.4.1.89: deleted, included in EC 2.4.1.69, type 1 galactoside α-(1,2)-fucosyltransferase
- EC 2.4.1.90: N-acetyllactosamine synthase
- EC 2.4.1.91: flavonol 3-O-glucosyltransferase
- EC 2.4.1.92: (N-acetylneuraminyl)-galactosylglucosylceramide N-acetylgalactosaminyltransferase
- EC 2.4.1.93: Now EC 4.2.2.18, inulin fructotransferase (DFA-III-forming)
- EC 2.4.1.94: protein N-acetylglucosaminyltransferase
- EC 2.4.1.95: deleted
- EC 2.4.1.96: sn-glycerol-3-phosphate 1-galactosyltransferase
- EC 2.4.1.97: 1,3-β-D-glucan phosphorylase
- EC 2.4.1.98: deleted, Now included with EC 2.4.1.90, N-acetyllactosamine synthase
- EC 2.4.1.99: sucrose:sucrose fructosyltransferase
- EC 2.4.1.100: 2,1-fructan:2,1-fructan 1-fructosyltransferase
- EC 2.4.1.101: α-1,3-mannosyl-glycoprotein 2-β-N-acetylglucosaminyltransferase
- EC 2.4.1.102: β-1,3-galactosyl-O-glycosyl-glycoprotein β-1,6-N-acetylglucosaminyltransferase
- EC 2.4.1.103: alizarin 2-β-glucosyltransferase
- EC 2.4.1.104: o-dihydroxycoumarin 7-O-glucosyltransferase
- EC 2.4.1.105: vitexin β-glucosyltransferase
- EC 2.4.1.106: isovitexin β-glucosyltransferase
- EC 2.4.1.107: deleted, now included with EC 2.4.1.17, glucuronosyltransferase
- EC 2.4.1.108: deleted, now included with EC 2.4.1.17, glucuronosyltransferase
- EC 2.4.1.109: dolichyl-phosphate-mannose—protein mannosyltransferase
- EC 2.4.1.110: tRNA-queuosine β-mannosyltransferase
- EC 2.4.1.111: coniferyl-alcohol glucosyltransferase
- EC 2.4.1.112: The protein referred to in this entry is now known to be glycogenin so the entry has been incorporated into EC 2.4.1.186, glycogenin glucosyltransferase
- EC 2.4.1.113: α-1,4-glucan-protein synthase (ADP-forming)
- EC 2.4.1.114: 2-coumarate O-β-glucosyltransferase
- EC 2.4.1.115: anthocyanidin 3-O-glucosyltransferase
- EC 2.4.1.116: cyanidin 3-O-rutinoside 5-O-glucosyltransferase
- EC 2.4.1.117: dolichyl-phosphate β-glucosyltransferase
- EC 2.4.1.118: cytokinin 7-β-glucosyltransferase
- EC 2.4.1.119: transferred to EC 2.4.99.18, dolichyl-diphosphooligosaccharideprotein glycotransferase
- EC 2.4.1.120: sinapate 1-glucosyltransferase
- EC 2.4.1.121: indole-3-acetate β-glucosyltransferase
- EC 2.4.1.122: N-acetylgalactosaminide β-1,3-galactosyltransferase
- EC 2.4.1.123: inositol 3-α-galactosyltransferase
- EC 2.4.1.124: Now EC 2.4.1.87, N-acetyllactosaminide 3-α-galactosyltransferase
- EC 2.4.1.125: sucrose—1,6-α-glucan 3(6)-α-glucosyltransferase
- EC 2.4.1.126: hydroxycinnamate 4-β-glucosyltransferase
- EC 2.4.1.127: monoterpenol β-glucosyltransferase
- EC 2.4.1.128: scopoletin glucosyltransferase
- EC 2.4.1.129: peptidoglycan glycosyltransferase
- EC 2.4.1.130: Now covered by EC 2.4.1.258, EC 2.4.1.259, EC 2.4.1.260 and EC 2.4.1.261
- EC 2.4.1.131: GDP-Man:Man_{3}GlcNAc_{2}-PP-dolichol α-1,2-mannosyltransferase
- EC 2.4.1.132: GDP-Man:Man_{1}GlcNAc_{2}-PP-dolichol α-1,3-mannosyltransferase
- EC 2.4.1.133: xylosylprotein 4-β-galactosyltransferase
- EC 2.4.1.134: galactosylxylosylprotein 3-β-galactosyltransferase
- EC 2.4.1.135: galactosylgalactosylxylosylprotein 3-β-glucuronosyltransferase
- EC 2.4.1.136: gallate 1-β-glucosyltransferase
- EC 2.4.1.137: sn-glycerol-3-phosphate 2-α-galactosyltransferase
- EC 2.4.1.138: mannotetraose 2-α-N-acetylglucosaminyltransferase
- EC 2.4.1.139: maltose synthase
- EC 2.4.1.140: alternansucrase
- EC 2.4.1.141: N-acetylglucosaminyldiphosphodolichol N-acetylglucosaminyltransferase
- EC 2.4.1.142: chitobiosyldiphosphodolichol β-mannosyltransferase
- EC 2.4.1.143: α-1,6-mannosyl-glycoprotein 2-β-N-acetylglucosaminyltransferase
- EC 2.4.1.144: β-1,4-mannosyl-glycoprotein 4-β-N-acetylglucosaminyltransferase
- EC 2.4.1.145: α-1,3-mannosyl-glycoprotein 4-β-N-acetylglucosaminyltransferase
- EC 2.4.1.146: β-1,3-galactosyl-O-glycosyl-glycoprotein β-1,3-N-acetylglucosaminyltransferase
- EC 2.4.1.147: acetylgalactosaminyl-O-glycosyl-glycoprotein β-1,3-N-acetylglucosaminyltransferase
- EC 2.4.1.148: acetylgalactosaminyl-O-glycosyl-glycoprotein β-1,6-N-acetylglucosaminyltransferase
- EC 2.4.1.149: N-acetyllactosaminide β-1,3-N-acetylglucosaminyltransferase
- EC 2.4.1.150: N-acetyllactosaminide β-1,6-N-acetylglucosaminyltransferase
- EC 2.4.1.151: now included with EC 2.4.1.87 N-acetyllactosaminide 3-α-galactosyltransferase
- EC 2.4.1.152: 4-galactosyl-N-acetylglucosaminide 3-α-L-fucosyltransferase
- EC 2.4.1.153: UDP-N-acetylglucosamine—dolichyl-phosphate N-acetylglucosaminyltransferase
- EC 2.4.1.154: identical to EC 2.4.1.79, globotriaosylceramide 3-β-N-acetylgalactosaminyltransferase
- EC 2.4.1.155: α-1,6-mannosyl-glycoprotein 6-β-N-acetylglucosaminyltransferase
- EC 2.4.1.156: indolylacetyl-myo-inositol galactosyltransferase
- EC 2.4.1.157: 1,2-diacylglycerol 3-glucosyltransferase, now classified as EC 2.4.1.336, monoglucosyldiacylglycerol synthase, and EC 2.4.1.337, 1,2-diacylglycerol 3-α-glucosyltransferase
- EC 2.4.1.158: 13-hydroxydocosanoate 13-β-glucosyltransferase
- EC 2.4.1.159: flavonol-3-O-glucoside L-rhamnosyltransferase
- EC 2.4.1.160: pyridoxine 5′-O-β-D-glucosyltransferase
- EC 2.4.1.161: oligosaccharide 4-α-D-glucosyltransferase
- EC 2.4.1.162: aldose β-D-fructosyltransferase
- EC 2.4.1.163: now included in EC 2.4.1.149, N-acetyllactosaminide β-1,3-N-acetylglucosaminyltransferase
- EC 2.4.1.164: now included with EC 2.4.1.150, N-acetyllactosaminide β-1,6-N-acetylglucosaminyltransferase
- EC 2.4.1.165: N-acetylneuraminylgalactosylglucosylceramide β-1,4-N-acetylgalactosaminyltransferase
- EC 2.4.1.166: raffinose—raffinose α-galactosyltransferase
- EC 2.4.1.167: sucrose 6^{F}-α-galactosyltransferase
- EC 2.4.1.168: xyloglucan 4-glucosyltransferase
- EC 2.4.1.169: now EC 2.4.2.39, xyloglucan 6-xylosyltransferase
- EC 2.4.1.170: isoflavone 7-O-glucosyltransferase
- EC 2.4.1.171: methyl-ONN-azoxymethanol β-D-glucosyltransferase
- EC 2.4.1.172: salicyl-alcohol β-D-glucosyltransferase
- EC 2.4.1.173: sterol 3β-glucosyltransferase
- EC 2.4.1.174: glucuronylgalactosylproteoglycan 4-β-N-acetylgalactosaminyltransferase
- EC 2.4.1.175: glucuronosyl-N-acetylgalactosaminyl-proteoglycan 4-β-N-acetylgalactosaminyltransferase
- EC 2.4.1.176: gibberellin β-D-glucosyltransferase
- EC 2.4.1.177: cinnamate β-D-glucosyltransferase
- EC 2.4.1.178: hydroxymandelonitrile glucosyltransferase
- EC 2.4.1.179: lactosylceramide β-1,3-galactosyltransferase
- EC 2.4.1.180: lipopolysaccharide N-acetylmannosaminouronosyltransferase
- EC 2.4.1.181: hydroxyanthraquinone glucosyltransferase
- EC 2.4.1.182: lipid-A-disaccharide synthase
- EC 2.4.1.183: α-1,3-glucan synthase
- EC 2.4.1.184: galactolipid galactosyltransferase
- EC 2.4.1.185: flavanone 7-O-β-glucosyltransferase
- EC 2.4.1.186: glycogenin glucosyltransferase
- EC 2.4.1.187: N-acetylglucosaminyldiphosphoundecaprenol N-acetyl-β-D-mannosaminyltransferase
- EC 2.4.1.188: N-acetylglucosaminyldiphosphoundecaprenol glucosyltransferase
- EC 2.4.1.189: uteolin 7-O-glucuronosyltransferase
- EC 2.4.1.190: luteolin-7-O-glucuronide 2′′-O-glucuronosyltransferase
- EC 2.4.1.191: luteolin-7-O-diglucuronide 4′-O-glucuronosyltransferase
- EC 2.4.1.192: nuatigenin 3β-glucosyltransferase
- EC 2.4.1.193: sarsapogenin 3β-glucosyltransferase
- EC 2.4.1.194: 4-hydroxybenzoate 4-O-β-D-glucosyltransferase
- EC 2.4.1.195: N-hydroxythioamide S-β-glucosyltransferase
- EC 2.4.1.196: nicotinate glucosyltransferase
- EC 2.4.1.197: high-mannose-oligosaccharide β-1,4-N-acetylglucosaminyltransferase
- EC 2.4.1.198: phosphatidylinositol N-acetylglucosaminyltransferase
- EC 2.4.1.199: β-mannosylphosphodecaprenol—mannooligosaccharide 6-mannosyltransferase
- EC 2.4.1.200: now EC 4.2.2.17, inulin fructotransferase (DFA-I-forming)
- EC 2.4.1.201: α-1,6-mannosyl-glycoprotein 4-β-N-acetylglucosaminyltransferase
- EC 2.4.1.202: 2,4-dihydroxy-7-methoxy-2H-1,4-benzoxazin-3(4H)-one 2-D-glucosyltransferase
- EC 2.4.1.203: trans-zeatin O-β-D-glucosyltransferase
- EC 2.4.1.204: now EC 2.4.2.40, zeatin O-β-D-xylosyltransferase
- EC 2.4.1.205: galactogen 6β-galactosyltransferase
- EC 2.4.1.206: lactosylceramide 1,3-N-acetyl-β-D-glucosaminyltransferase
- EC 2.4.1.207: xyloglucan:xyloglucosyl transferase
- EC 2.4.1.208: diglucosyl diacylglycerol synthase (1,2-linking)
- EC 2.4.1.209: cis-p-coumarate glucosyltransferase
- EC 2.4.1.210: limonoid glucosyltransferase
- EC 2.4.1.211: 1,3-β-galactosyl-N-acetylhexosamine phosphorylase
- EC 2.4.1.212: hyaluronan synthase
- EC 2.4.1.213: glucosylglycerol-phosphate synthase
- EC 2.4.1.214: glycoprotein 3-α-L-fucosyltransferase
- EC 2.4.1.215: cis-zeatin O-β-D-glucosyltransferase
- EC 2.4.1.216: trehalose 6-phosphate phosphorylase
- EC 2.4.1.217: mannosyl-3-phosphoglycerate synthase
- EC 2.4.1.218: hydroquinone glucosyltransferase
- EC 2.4.1.219: vomilenine glucosyltransferase
- EC 2.4.1.220: indoxyl-UDPG glucosyltransferase
- EC 2.4.1.221: peptide-O-fucosyltransferase
- EC 2.4.1.222: O-fucosylpeptide 3-β-N-acetylglucosaminyltransferase
- EC 2.4.1.223: glucuronosyl-galactosyl-proteoglycan 4-α-N-acetylglucosaminyltransferase
- EC 2.4.1.224: glucuronosyl-N-acetylglucosaminyl-proteoglycan 4-α-N-acetylglucosaminyltransferase
- EC 2.4.1.225: N-acetylglucosaminyl-proteoglycan 4-β-glucuronosyltransferase
- EC 2.4.1.226: N-acetylgalactosaminyl-proteoglycan 3-β-glucuronosyltransferase
- EC 2.4.1.227: undecaprenyldiphospho-muramoylpentapeptide β-N-acetylglucosaminyltransferase
- EC 2.4.1.228: lactosylceramide 4-α-galactosyltransferase
- EC 2.4.1.229: [Skp1-protein]-hydroxyproline N-acetylglucosaminyltransferase
- EC 2.4.1.230: kojibiose phosphorylase
- EC 2.4.1.231: α,α-trehalose phosphorylase (configuration-retaining)
- EC 2.4.1.232: initiation-specific α-1,6-mannosyltransferase
- EC 2.4.1.233: deleted: identical to EC 2.4.1.115, anthocyanidin 3-O-glucosyltransferase
- EC 2.4.1.234: kaempferol 3-O-galactosyltransferase
- EC 2.4.1.235: deleted: identical to EC 2.4.1.116, cyanidin 3-O-rutinoside 5-O-glucosyltransferase
- EC 2.4.1.236: flavanone 7-O-glucoside 2′′-O-β-L-rhamnosyltransferase
- EC 2.4.1.237: flavonol 7-O-β-glucosyltransferase
- EC 2.4.1.238: delphinidin 3,5-di-O-glucoside 3′-O-glucosyltransferase
- EC 2.4.1.239: flavonol-3-O-glucoside glucosyltransferase
- EC 2.4.1.240: flavonol-3-O-glycoside glucosyltransferase
- EC 2.4.1.241: flavonol-3-O-glycoside glucosyltransferase
- EC 2.4.1.242: NDP-glucose—starch glucosyltransferase
- EC 2.4.1.243: 6^{G}-fructosyltransferase
- EC 2.4.1.244: N-acetyl-β-glucosaminyl-glycoprotein 4-β-N-acetylgalactosaminyltransferase
- EC 2.4.1.245: α,α-trehalose synthase
- EC 2.4.1.246: mannosylfructose-phosphate synthase
- EC 2.4.1.247: β-D-galactosyl-(1→4)-L-rhamnose phosphorylase
- EC 2.4.1.248: cycloisomaltooligosaccharide glucanotransferase
- EC 2.4.1.249: delphinidin 3′,5′-O-glucosyltransferase
- EC 2.4.1.250: D-inositol-3-phosphate glycosyltransferase
- EC 2.4.1.251: GlcA-β-(1→2)-D-Man-α-(1→3)-D-Glc-β-(1→4)-D-Glc-α-1-diphospho-ditrans,octacis-undecaprenol 4-β-mannosyltransferase
- EC 2.4.1.252: GDP-mannose:cellobiosyl-diphosphopolyprenol α-mannosyltransferase
- EC 2.4.1.253: baicalein 7-O-glucuronosyltransferase
- EC 2.4.1.254: cyanidin-3-O-glucoside 2′′-O-glucuronosyltransferase
- EC 2.4.1.255: protein O-GlcNAc transferase
- EC 2.4.1.256: dolichyl-P-Glc:Glc_{2}Man_{9}GlcNAc_{2}-PP-dolichol α-1,2-glucosyltransferase
- EC 2.4.1.257: GDP-Man:Man_{2}GlcNAc_{2}-PP-dolichol α-1,6-mannosyltransferase
- EC 2.4.1.258: dolichyl-P-Man:Man_{5}GlcNAc_{2}-PP-dolichol α-1,3-mannosyltransferase
- EC 2.4.1.259: dolichyl-P-Man:Man_{6}GlcNAc_{2}-PP-dolichol α-1,2-mannosyltransferase
- EC 2.4.1.260: dolichyl-P-Man:Man_{7}GlcNAc_{2}-PP-dolichol α-1,6-mannosyltransferase
- EC 2.4.1.261: dolichyl-P-Man:Man_{8}GlcNAc_{2}-PP-dolichol α-1,2-mannosyltransferase
- EC 2.4.1.262: soyasapogenol glucuronosyltransferase
- EC 2.4.1.263: abscisate β-glucosyltransferase
- EC 2.4.1.264: D-Man-α-(1→3)-D-Glc-β-(1→4)-DD-Glc-α-1-diphosphoundecaprenol 2-β-glucuronosyltransferase
- EC 2.4.1.265: olichyl-P-Glc:Glc_{1}Man_{9}GlcNAc_{2}-PP-dolichol α-1,3-glucosyltransferase
- EC 2.4.1.266: glucosyl-3-phosphoglycerate synthase
- EC 2.4.1.267: dolichyl-P-Glc:Man_{9}GlcNAc_{2}-PP-dolichol α-1,3-glucosyltransferase
- EC 2.4.1.268: glucosylglycerate synthase
- EC 2.4.1.269: mannosylglycerate synthase
- EC 2.4.1.270: mannosylglucosyl-3-phosphoglycerate synthase
- EC 2.4.1.271: crocetin glucosyltransferase
- EC 2.4.1.272: soyasapogenol B glucuronide galactosyltransferase
- EC 2.4.1.273: soyasaponin III rhamnosyltransferase
- EC 2.4.1.274: glucosylceramide β-1,4-galactosyltransferase
- EC 2.4.1.275: neolactotriaosylceramide β-1,4-galactosyltransferase
- EC 2.4.1.276: zeaxanthin glucosyltransferase
- EC 2.4.1.277: glycosyltransferase DesVII
- EC 2.4.1.278: desosaminyl transferase EryCIII
- EC 2.4.1.279: nigerose phosphorylase
- EC 2.4.1.280: N,N′-diacetylchitobiose phosphorylase
- EC 2.4.1.281: 4-O-β-D-mannosyl-D-glucose phosphorylase
- EC 2.4.1.282: 3-O-α-D-glucosyl-L-rhamnose phosphorylase
- EC 2.4.1.283: 2-deoxystreptamine N-acetyl-D-glucosaminyltransferase
- EC 2.4.1.284: 2-deoxystreptamine glucosyltransferase
- EC 2.4.1.285: UDP-GlcNAc:ribostamycin N-acetylglucosaminyltransferase
- EC 2.4.1.286: chalcone 4′-O-glucosyltransferase
- EC 2.4.1.287: rhamnopyranosyl-N-acetylglucosaminyl-diphospho-decaprenol β-1,4/1,5-galactofuranosyltransferase
- EC 2.4.1.288: galactofuranosylgalactofuranosylrhamnosyl-N-acetylglucosaminyl-diphospho-decaprenol β-1,5/1,6-galactofuranosyltransferase
- EC 2.4.1.289: N-acetylglucosaminyl-diphospho-decaprenol L-rhamnosyltransferase
- EC 2.4.1.290: N,N′-diacetylbacillosaminyl-diphospho-undecaprenol α-1,3-N-acetylgalactosaminyltransferase
- EC 2.4.1.291: N-acetylgalactosamine-N,N′-diacetylbacillosaminyl-diphospho-undecaprenol 4-α-N-acetylgalactosaminyltransferase
- EC 2.4.1.292: GalNAc-α-(1→4)-GalNAc-α-(1→3)-diNAcBac-PP-undecaprenol α-1,4-N-acetyl-D-galactosaminyltransferase
- EC 2.4.1.293: GalNAc_{5}-diNAcBac-PP-undecaprenol β-1,3-glucosyltransferase
- EC 2.4.1.294: cyanidin 3-''O''-galactosyltransferase
- EC 2.4.1.295: anthocyanin 3-''O''-sambubioside 5-''O''-glucosyltransferase
- EC 2.4.1.296: anthocyanidin 3-''O''-coumaroylrutinoside 5-''O''-glucosyltransferase
- EC 2.4.1.297: anthocyanidin 3-''O''-glucoside 2′′-''O''-glucosyltransferase
- EC 2.4.1.298: anthocyanidin 3-''O''-glucoside 5-''O''-glucosyltransferase
- EC 2.4.1.299: cyanidin 3-''O''-glucoside 5-''O''-glucosyltransferase (acyl-glucose)
- EC 2.4.1.300: cyanidin 3-''O''-glucoside 7-''O''-glucosyltransferase (acyl-glucose)
- EC 2.4.1.301: 2′-deamino-2′-hydroxyneamine 1-α-D-kanosaminyltransferase
- EC 2.4.1.302: L-demethylnoviosyl transferase
- EC 2.4.1.303: UDP-Gal:α-D-GlcNAc-diphosphoundecaprenol β-1,3-galactosyltransferase
- EC 2.4.1.304: UDP-Gal:α-D-GlcNAc-diphosphoundecaprenol β-1,4-galactosyltransferase
- EC 2.4.1.305: UDP-Glc:α-D-GlcNAc-glucosaminyl-diphosphoundecaprenol β-1,3-glucosyltransferase
- EC 2.4.1.306: UDP-GalNAc:α-D-GalNAc-diphosphoundecaprenol α-1,3-N-acetylgalactosaminyltransferase
- EC 2.4.1.307: UDP-Gal:α-D-GalNAc-1,3-α-D-GalNAc-diphosphoundecaprenol β-1,3-galactosyltransferase. Now included in EC 2.4.1.122, N-acetylgalactosaminide β-1,3-galactosyltransferase
- EC 2.4.1.308: GDP-Fuc:β-D-Gal-1,3-α-D-GalNAc-1,3-α-GalNAc-diphosphoundecaprenol α-1,2-fucosyltransferase
- EC 2.4.1.309: UDP-Gal:α-L-Fuc-1,2-β-Gal-1,3-α-GalNAc-1,3-α-GalNAc-diphosphoundecaprenol α-1,3-galactosyltransferase
- EC 2.4.1.310: vancomycin aglycone glucosyltransferase
- EC 2.4.1.311: chloroorienticin B synthase
- EC 2.4.1.312: protein ''O''-mannose β-1,4-''N''-acetylglucosaminyltransferase
- EC 2.4.1.313: protein ''O''-mannose β-1,3-''N''-acetylgalactosaminyltransferase
- EC 2.4.1.314: ginsenoside Rd glucosyltransferase
- EC 2.4.1.315: diglucosyl diacylglycerol synthase (1,6-linking)
- EC 2.4.1.316: tylactone mycaminosyltransferase
- EC 2.4.1.317: ''O''-mycaminosyltylonolide 6-deoxyallosyltransferase
- EC 2.4.1.318: demethyllactenocin mycarosyltransferase
- EC 2.4.1.319: β-1,4-mannooligosaccharide phosphorylase
- EC 2.4.1.320: 1,4-β-mannosyl-''N''-acetylglucosamine phosphorylase
- EC 2.4.1.321: cellobionic acid phosphorylase
- EC 2.4.1.322: devancosaminyl-vancomycin vancosaminetransferase
- EC 2.4.1.323: 7-deoxyloganetic acid glucosyltransferase
- EC 2.4.1.324: 7-deoxyloganetin glucosyltransferase
- EC 2.4.1.325: TDP-''N''-acetylfucosamine:lipid II ''N''-acetylfucosaminyltransferase
- EC 2.4.1.326: aklavinone 7-L-rhodosaminyltransferase
- EC 2.4.1.327: aclacinomycin-T 2-deoxy-L-fucose transferase
- EC 2.4.1.328: erythronolide mycarosyltransferase
- EC 2.4.1.329: sucrose 6^{F}-phosphate phosphorylase
- EC 2.4.1.330: β-D-glucosyl crocetin β-1,6-glucosyltransferase
- EC 2.4.1.331: 8-demethyltetracenomycin C L-rhamnosyltransferase
- EC 2.4.1.332: 1,2-α-glucosylglycerol phosphorylase
- EC 2.4.1.333: 1,2-β-oligoglucan phosphorylase
- EC 2.4.1.334: 1,3-α-oligoglucan phosphorylase
- EC 2.4.1.335: dolichyl N-acetyl-α-D-glucosaminyl phosphate 3-β-D-2,3-diacetamido-2,3-dideoxy-β-D-glucuronosyltransferase
- EC 2.4.1.336: monoglucosyldiacylglycerol synthase
- EC 2.4.1.337: 1,2-diacylglycerol 3-α-glucosyltransferase
- EC 2.4.1.338: validoxylamine A glucosyltransferase
- EC 2.4.1.339: β-1,2-mannobiose phosphorylase
- EC 2.4.1.340: 1,2-β-oligomannan phosphorylase
- EC 2.4.1.341: α-1,2-colitosyltransferase
- EC 2.4.1.342: α-maltose-1-phosphate synthase
- EC 2.4.1.343: UDP-Gal:α-D-GlcNAc-diphosphoundecaprenol α-1,3-galactosyltransferase
- EC 2.4.1.344: type 2 galactoside α-(1,2)-fucosyltransferase
- EC 2.4.1.345: phosphatidyl-''myo''-inositol α-mannosyltransferase
- EC 2.4.1.346: phosphatidyl-''myo''-inositol dimannoside synthase
- EC 2.4.1.347: α,α-trehalose-phosphate synthase (ADP-forming)
- EC 2.4.1.348: N-acetyl-α-D-glucosaminyl-diphospho-ditrans,octacis-undecaprenol 3-α-mannosyltransferase
- EC 2.4.1.349: mannosyl-N-acetyl-α-D-glucosaminyl-diphospho-ditrans,octacis-undecaprenol 3-α-mannosyltransferase
- EC 2.4.1.350: mogroside IE synthase
- EC 2.4.1.351: rhamnogalacturonan I rhamnosyltransferase
- EC 2.4.1.352: glucosylglycerate phosphorylase
- EC 2.4.1.353: sordaricin 6-deoxyaltrosyltransferase
- EC 2.4.1.354: (''R'')-mandelonitrile β-glucosyltransferase
- EC 2.4.1.355: poly(ribitol-phosphate) β-''N''-acetylglucosaminyltransferase
- EC 2.4.1.356: glucosyl-dolichyl phosphate glucuronosyltransferase
- EC 2.4.1.357: phlorizin synthase
- EC 2.4.1.358: acylphloroglucinol glucosyltransferase
- EC 2.4.1.359: glucosylglycerol phosphorylase (configuration-retaining)
- EC 2.4.1.360: 2-hydroxyflavanone ''C''-glucosyltransferase
- EC 2.4.1.361: GDP-mannose:di-''myo''-inositol-1,3′-phosphate β-1,2-mannosyltransferase
- EC 2.4.1.362: α-(1→3) branching sucrase
- EC 2.4.1.363: ginsenoside 20-''O''-glucosyltransferase
- EC 2.4.1.364: protopanaxadiol-type ginsenoside 3-''O''-glucosyltransferase
- EC 2.4.1.365: protopanaxadiol-type ginsenoside-3-''O''-glucoside 2′′-''O''-glucosyltransferase
- EC 2.4.1.366: ginsenoside F1 6-''O''-glucosyltransferase
- EC 2.4.1.367: ginsenoside 6-''O''-glucosyltransferase
- EC 2.4.1.368: oleanolate 3-''O''-glucosyltransferase
- EC 2.4.1.369: enterobactin ''C''-glucosyltransferase
- EC 2.4.1.370: inositol phosphorylceramide mannosyltransferase
- EC 2.4.1.371: polymannosyl GlcNAc-diphospho-''ditrans,octacis''-undecaprenol 2,3-α-mannosylpolymerase
- EC 2.4.1.372: mutansucrase
- EC 2.4.1.373: α-(1→2) branching sucrase
- EC 2.4.1.374: β-1,2-mannooligosaccharide synthase
- EC 2.4.1.375: rhamnogalacturonan I galactosyltransferase
- EC 2.4.1.376: EGF-domain serine glucosyltransferase
- EC 2.4.1.377: dTDP-Rha:α-D-Gal-diphosphoundecaprenol α-1,3-rhamnosyltransferase
- EC 2.4.1.378: GDP-mannose:α-L-Rha-(1→3)-α-D-Gal-PP-Und α-1,4-mannosyltransferase
- EC 2.4.1.379: GDP-Man:α-D-Gal-diphosphoundecaprenol α-1,3-mannosyltransferase
- EC 2.4.1.380: GDP-Man:α-D-Man-(1→3)-α-D-Gal diphosphoundecaprenol α-1,2-mannosyltransferase
- EC 2.4.1.381: dTDP-Rha:α-D-Man-(1→3)-α-D-Gal diphosphoundecaprenol α-1,2-rhamnosyltransferase
- EC 2.4.1.382: CDP-abequose:α-L-Rha2OAc-(1→2)-α-D-Man-(1→2)-α-D-Man-(1→3)-α-D-Gal-PP-Und α-1,3-abequosyltransferase
- EC 2.4.1.383: GDP-Man:α-L-Rha-(1→3)-α-D-Gal-PP-Und β-1,4-mannosyltransferase
- EC 2.4.1.384: NDP-glycosyltransferase

=== EC 2.4.2: Pentosyltransferases ===
- EC 2.4.2.1: purine-nucleoside phosphorylase
- EC 2.4.2.2: pyrimidine-nucleoside phosphorylase
- EC 2.4.2.3: uridine phosphorylase
- EC 2.4.2.4: thymidine phosphorylase
- EC 2.4.2.5: nucleoside ribosyltransferase
- EC 2.4.2.6: nucleoside deoxyribosyltransferase
- EC 2.4.2.7: adenine phosphoribosyltransferase
- EC 2.4.2.8: hypoxanthine phosphoribosyltransferase
- EC 2.4.2.9: uracil phosphoribosyltransferase
- EC 2.4.2.10: orotate phosphoribosyltransferase
- EC 2.4.2.11: now EC 6.3.4.21 nicotinate phosphoribosyltransferase
- EC 2.4.2.12: nicotinamide phosphoribosyltransferase
- EC 2.4.2.13: now EC 2.5.1.6 methionine adenosyltransferase
- EC 2.4.2.14: amidophosphoribosyltransferase
- EC 2.4.2.15: guanosine phosphorylase
- EC 2.4.2.16: urate-ribonucleotide phosphorylase
- EC 2.4.2.17: ATP phosphoribosyltransferase
- EC 2.4.2.18: anthranilate phosphoribosyltransferase
- EC 2.4.2.19: nicotinate-nucleotide diphosphorylase (carboxylating)
- EC 2.4.2.20: dioxotetrahydropyrimidine phosphoribosyltransferase
- EC 2.4.2.21: nicotinate-nucleotide—dimethylbenzimidazole phosphoribosyltransferase
- EC 2.4.2.22: xanthine phosphoribosyltransferase
- EC 2.4.2.23: This activity has been shown to be catalysed by EC 2.4.2.2, pyrimidine-nucleoside phosphorylase, EC 2.4.2.3, uridine phosphorylase, and EC 2.4.2.4, thymidine phosphorylase.
- EC 2.4.2.24: 1,4-β-D-xylan synthase
- EC 2.4.2.25: flavone apiosyltransferase
- EC 2.4.2.26: protein xylosyltransferase
- EC 2.4.2.27: dTDP-dihydrostreptose—streptidine-6-phosphate dihydrostreptosyltransferase
- EC 2.4.2.28: S-methyl-5′-thioadenosine phosphorylase
- EC 2.4.2.29: tRNA-guanosine^{34} preQ_{1} transglycosylase
- EC 2.4.2.30: NAD^{+} ADP-ribosyltransferase
- EC 2.4.2.31: NAD^{+}—protein-arginine ADP-ribosyltransferase
- EC 2.4.2.32: dolichyl-phosphate D-xylosyltransferase
- EC 2.4.2.33: dolichyl-xylosyl-phosphate—protein xylosyltransferase
- EC 2.4.2.34: indolylacetylinositol arabinosyltransferase
- EC 2.4.2.35: flavonol-3-O-glycoside xylosyltransferase
- EC 2.4.2.36: NAD^{+}—diphthamide ADP-ribosyltransferase
- EC 2.4.2.37: NAD^{+} —dinitrogen-reductase ADP-D-ribosyltransferase
- EC 2.4.2.38: glycoprotein 2-β-D-xylosyltransferase
- EC 2.4.2.39: xyloglucan 6-xylosyltransferase
- EC 2.4.2.40: zeatin O-β-D-xylosyltransferase
- EC 2.4.2.41: xylogalacturonan β-1,3-xylosyltransferase
- EC 2.4.2.42: UDP-D-xylose:β-D-glucoside α-1,3-D-xylosyltransferase
- EC 2.4.2.43: lipid IV_{A} 4-amino-4-deoxy-L-arabinosyltransferase
- EC 2.4.2.44: S-methyl-5′-thioinosine phosphorylase
- EC 2.4.2.45: decaprenyl-phosphate phosphoribosyltransferase
- EC 2.4.2.46: galactan 5-O-arabinofuranosyltransferase
- EC 2.4.2.47: arabinofuranan 3-O-arabinosyltransferase
- EC 2.4.2.48: tRNA-guanine15 transglycosylase
- EC 2.4.2.49: neamine phosphoribosyltransferase
- EC 2.4.2.50: cyanidin 3-''O''-galactoside 2′′-''O''-xylosyltransferase
- EC 2.4.2.51: anthocyanidin 3-''O''-glucoside 2′′′-''O''-xylosyltransferase
- EC 2.4.2.52: triphosphoribosyl-dephospho-CoA synthase
- EC 2.4.2.53: undecaprenyl-phosphate 4-deoxy-4-formamido-L-arabinose transferase
- EC 2.4.2.54: β-ribofuranosylphenol 5′-phosphate synthase
- EC 2.4.2.55: nicotinate D-ribonucleotide:phenol phospho-D-ribosyltransferase
- EC 2.4.2.56: kaempferol 3-''O''-xylosyltransferase
- EC 2.4.2.57: AMP phosphorylase
- EC 2.4.2.58: hydroxyproline ''O''-arabinosyltransferase
- EC 2.4.2.59: sulfide-dependent adenosine diphosphate thiazole synthase
- EC 2.4.2.60: cysteine-dependent adenosine diphosphate thiazole synthase
- EC 2.4.2.61: α-dystroglycan β1,4-xylosyltransferase
- EC 2.4.2.62: xylosyl α-1,3-xylosyltransferase
- EC 2.4.2.63: EGF-domain serine xylosyltransferase
- EC 2.4.2.64: tRNA-guanosine^{34} queuine transglycosylase

=== EC 2.4.99: Transferring Other Glycosyl Groups ===
- EC 2.4.99.1: β-galactoside α-(2,6)-sialyltransferase
- EC 2.4.99.2: β-D-galactosyl-(1→3)-N-acetyl-β-D-galactosaminide α-2,3-sialyltransferase
- EC 2.4.99.3: α-N-acetylgalactosaminide α-2,6-sialyltransferase
- EC 2.4.99.4: β-galactoside α-2,3-sialyltransferase
- EC 2.4.99.5: galactosyldiacylglycerol α-2,3-sialyltransferase
- EC 2.4.99.6: N-acetyllactosaminide α-2,3-sialyltransferase
- EC 2.4.99.7: α-N-acetylneuraminyl-2,3-β-galactosyl-1,3-N-acetylgalactosaminide 6-α-sialyltransferase
- EC 2.4.99.8: α-N-acetylneuraminate α-2,8-sialyltransferase
- EC 2.4.99.9: lactosylceramide α-2,3-sialyltransferase
- EC 2.4.99.10: Now included in EC 2.4.99.6, N-acetyllactosaminide α-2,3-sialyltransferase
- EC 2.4.99.11: Now included with EC 2.4.99.1,β-galactoside α-(2,6)-sialyltransferase
- EC 2.4.99.12: lipid IV_{A} 3-deoxy-D-manno-octulosonic acid transferase
- EC 2.4.99.13: (Kdo)-lipid IV_{A}3-deoxy-D-manno-octulosonic acid transferase
- EC 2.4.99.14: (Kdo)_{2}-lipid IV_{A} (2-8) 3-deoxy-D-manno-octulosonic acid transferase
- EC 2.4.99.15: (Kdo)_{3}-lipid IV_{A} (2-4) 3-deoxy-D-manno-octulosonic acid transferase
- EC 2.4.99.16: starch synthase (maltosyl-transferring)
- EC 2.4.99.17: S-adenosylmethionine:tRNA ribosyltransferase-isomerase
- EC 2.4.99.18: dolichyl-diphosphooligosaccharide—protein glycotransferase
- EC 2.4.99.19: undecaprenyl-diphosphooligosaccharide—protein glycotransferase
- EC 2.4.99.20: 2′-phospho-ADP-ribosyl cyclase/2′-phospho-cyclic-ADP-ribose transferase
- EC 2.4.99.21: dolichyl-phosphooligosaccharide-protein glycotransferase
- EC 2.4.99.22: ''N''-acetylglucosaminide α-(2,6)-sialyltransferase

== EC 2.5: Transferring Alkyl or Aryl Groups, Other than Methyl Groups ==
=== EC 2.5.1: Transferring alkyl or aryl groups, other than methyl groups (only sub-subclass identified to date) ===
- EC 2.5.1.1: dimethylallyltranstransferase
- EC 2.5.1.2: thiamine pyridinylase
- EC 2.5.1.3: thiamine-phosphate diphosphorylase
- EC 2.5.1.4: Now EC 4.4.1.42 adenosylmethionine cyclotransferase
- EC 2.5.1.5: galactose-6-sulfurylase
- EC 2.5.1.6: methionine adenosyltransferase
- EC 2.5.1.7: UDP-N-acetylglucosamine 1-carboxyvinyltransferase
- EC 2.5.1.8: transferred to EC 2.5.1.75, tRNA dimethylallyltransferase
- EC 2.5.1.9: riboflavin synthase
- EC 2.5.1.10: (2E,6E)-farnesyl diphosphate synthase
- EC 2.5.1.11: Now covered by EC 2.5.1.84 (all-trans-nonaprenyl-diphosphate synthase [geranyl-diphosphate specific]) and EC 2.5.1.85 (all-trans-nonaprenyl diphosphate synthase [geranylgeranyl-diphosphate specific])
- EC 2.5.1.12: deleted, now included with EC 2.5.1.18 glutathione transferase
- EC 2.5.1.13: deleted, now included with EC 2.5.1.18 glutathione transferase
- EC 2.5.1.14: deleted, now included with EC 2.5.1.18 glutathione transferase
- EC 2.5.1.15: dihydropteroate synthase
- EC 2.5.1.16: spermidine synthase
- EC 2.5.1.17: cob(I)yrinic acid a,c-diamide adenosyltransferase
- EC 2.5.1.18: glutathione transferase
- EC 2.5.1.19: 3-phosphoshikimate 1-carboxyvinyltransferase
- EC 2.5.1.20: rubber cis-polyprenylcistransferase
- EC 2.5.1.21: squalene synthase
- EC 2.5.1.22: spermine synthase
- EC 2.5.1.23: sym-norspermidine synthase
- EC 2.5.1.24: discadenine synthase
- EC 2.5.1.25: tRNA-uridine aminocarboxypropyltransferase
- EC 2.5.1.26: alkylglycerone-phosphate synthase
- EC 2.5.1.27: adenylate dimethylallyltransferase
- EC 2.5.1.28: dimethylallylcistransferase
- EC 2.5.1.29: farnesyltranstransferase
- EC 2.5.1.30: trans-hexaprenyltranstransferase
- EC 2.5.1.31: ditrans,polycis-undecaprenyl-diphosphate synthase [(2E,6E)-farnesyl-diphosphate specific]
- EC 2.5.1.32: 15-cis-phytoene synthase
- EC 2.5.1.33: deleted, now covered by EC 2.5.1.82 hexaprenyl diphosphate synthase [geranylgeranyl-diphosphate specific] and EC 2.5.1.83 hexaprenyl diphosphate synthase [(2E,6E)-farnesyl-diphosphate specific]
- EC 2.5.1.34: tryptophan dimethylallyltransferase
- EC 2.5.1.35: aspulvinone dimethylallyltransferase
- EC 2.5.1.36: trihydroxypterocarpan dimethylallyltransferase
- EC 2.5.1.37: Now EC 4.4.1.20, leukotriene-C_{4} synthase
- EC 2.5.1.38: isonocardicin synthase
- EC 2.5.1.39: 4-hydroxybenzoate polyprenyltransferase
- EC 2.5.1.40: Now EC 4.2.3.9, aristolochene synthase
- EC 2.5.1.41: phosphoglycerol geranylgeranyltransferase
- EC 2.5.1.42: geranylgeranylglycerol-phosphate geranylgeranyltransferase
- EC 2.5.1.43: nicotianamine synthase
- EC 2.5.1.44: homospermidine synthase
- EC 2.5.1.45: homospermidine synthase (spermidine-specific)
- EC 2.5.1.46: deoxyhypusine synthase
- EC 2.5.1.47: cysteine synthase
- EC 2.5.1.48: cystathionine γ-synthase
- EC 2.5.1.49: O-acetylhomoserine aminocarboxypropyltransferase
- EC 2.5.1.50: zeatin 9-aminocarboxyethyltransferase
- EC 2.5.1.51: β-pyrazolylalanine synthase
- EC 2.5.1.52: L-mimosine synthase
- EC 2.5.1.53: uracilylalanine synthase
- EC 2.5.1.54: 3-deoxy-7-phosphoheptulonate synthase
- EC 2.5.1.55: 3-deoxy-8-phosphooctulonate synthase
- EC 2.5.1.56: N-acetylneuraminate synthase
- EC 2.5.1.57: N-acylneuraminate-9-phosphate synthase
- EC 2.5.1.58: protein farnesyltransferase
- EC 2.5.1.59: protein geranylgeranyltransferase type I
- EC 2.5.1.60: protein geranylgeranyltransferase type II
- EC 2.5.1.61: hydroxymethylbilane synthase
- EC 2.5.1.62: chlorophyll synthase
- EC 2.5.1.63: adenosyl-fluoride synthase
- EC 2.5.1.64: The reaction that was attributed to this enzyme is now known to be catalysed by two separate enzymes: EC 2.2.1.9 2-succinyl-5-enolpyruvyl-6-hydroxy-3-cyclohexene-1-carboxylic-acid synthase and EC 4.2.99.20 2-succinyl-6-hydroxy-2,4-cyclohexadiene-1-carboxylate synthase
- EC 2.5.1.65: O-phosphoserine sulfhydrylase
- EC 2.5.1.66: N^{2}-(2-carboxyethyl)arginine synthase
- EC 2.5.1.67: chrysanthemyl diphosphate synthase
- EC 2.5.1.68: (2Z,6E)-farnesyl diphosphate synthase
- EC 2.5.1.69: lavandulyl diphosphate synthase
- EC 2.5.1.70: naringenin 8-dimethylallyltransferase
- EC 2.5.1.71: leachianone-G 2′′-dimethylallyltransferase
- EC 2.5.1.72: quinolinate synthase
- EC 2.5.1.73: O-phospho-L-seryl-tRNA:Cys-tRNA synthase
- EC 2.5.1.74: 1,4-dihydroxy-2-naphthoate polyprenyltransferase
- EC 2.5.1.75: tRNA dimethylallyltransferase
- EC 2.5.1.76: cysteate synthase
- EC 2.5.1.77: Now EC 2.5.1.147, 5-amino-6-(D-ribitylamino)uracil—L-tyrosine 4-methylphenol transferase and EC 4.3.1.32, 7,8-didemethyl-8-hydroxy-5-deazariboflavin synthase.
- EC 2.5.1.78: 6,7-dimethyl-8-ribityllumazine synthase
- EC 2.5.1.79: thermospermine synthase
- EC 2.5.1.80: 7-dimethylallyltryptophan synthase
- EC 2.5.1.81: geranylfarnesyl diphosphate synthase
- EC 2.5.1.82: hexaprenyl diphosphate synthase [geranylgeranyl-diphosphate specific]
- EC 2.5.1.83: hexaprenyl diphosphate synthase [(2E,6E)-farnesyl-diphosphate specific]
- EC 2.5.1.84: all-trans-nonaprenyl-diphosphate synthase (geranyl-diphosphate specific)
- EC 2.5.1.85: all-trans-nonaprenyl diphosphate synthase [geranylgeranyl-diphosphate specific]
- EC 2.5.1.86: trans,polycis-decaprenyl diphosphate synthase
- EC 2.5.1.87: ditrans,polycis-polyprenyl diphosphate synthase [(2E,6E)-farnesyl diphosphate specific]
- EC 2.5.1.88: trans,polycis-polyprenyl diphosphate synthase [(2Z,6E)-farnesyl diphosphate specific]
- EC 2.5.1.89: tritrans,polycis-undecaprenyl diphosphate synthase [geranylgeranyl-diphosphate specific]
- EC 2.5.1.90: all-trans-octaprenyl-diphosphate synthase
- EC 2.5.1.91: all-trans-decaprenyl-diphosphate synthase
- EC 2.5.1.92: (2Z,6Z)-farnesyl diphosphate synthase
- EC 2.5.1.93: 4-hydroxybenzoate geranyltransferase
- EC 2.5.1.94: adenosyl-chloride synthase
- EC 2.5.1.95: xanthan ketal pyruvate transferase
- EC 2.5.1.96: 4,4′-diapophytoene synthase
- EC 2.5.1.97: pseudaminic acid synthase
- EC 2.5.1.98: Rhizobium leguminosarum exopolysaccharide glucosyl ketal-pyruvate-transferase
- EC 2.5.1.99: The activity was an artifact caused by photoisomerization of the product of EC 2.5.1.32, 15-cis-phytoene synthase
- EC 2.5.1.100: fumigaclavine A dimethylallyltransferase
- EC 2.5.1.101: N,N′-diacetyllegionaminate synthase
- EC 2.5.1.102: geranyl-pyrophosphate—olivetolic acid geranyltransferase
- EC 2.5.1.103: presqualene diphosphate synthase
- EC 2.5.1.104: N^{1}-aminopropylagmatine synthase
- EC 2.5.1.105: 7,8-dihydropterin-6-yl-methyl-4-(β-D-ribofuranosyl)aminobenzene 5′-phosphate synthase
- EC 2.5.1.106: tryprostatin B synthase
- EC 2.5.1.107: verruculogen prenyltransferase
- EC 2.5.1.108: 2-(3-amino-3-carboxypropyl)histidine synthase
- EC 2.5.1.109: brevianamide F prenyltransferase (deoxybrevianamide E-forming)
- EC 2.5.1.110: 12α,13α-dihydroxyfumitremorgin C prenyltransferase
- EC 2.5.1.111: 4-hydroxyphenylpyruvate 3-dimethylallyltransferase
- EC 2.5.1.112: adenylate dimethylallyltransferase (ADP/ATP-dependent)
- EC 2.5.1.113: [CysO sulfur-carrier protein]-thiocarboxylate-dependent cysteine synthase
- EC 2.5.1.114: tRNAPhe (4-demethylwyosine^{37}-C7) aminocarboxypropyltransferase
- EC 2.5.1.115: homogentisate phytyltransferase
- EC 2.5.1.116: homogentisate geranylgeranyltransferase
- EC 2.5.1.117: homogentisate solanesyltransferase
- EC 2.5.1.118: β-(isoxazolin-5-on-2-yl)-L-alanine synthase
- EC 2.5.1.119: β-(isoxazolin-5-on-4-yl)-L-alanine synthase
- EC 2.5.1.120: aminodeoxyfutalosine synthase
- EC 2.5.1.121: 5,10-dihydrophenazine-1-carboxylate 9-dimethylallyltransferase
- EC 2.5.1.122: 4-O-dimethylallyl-L-tyrosine synthase
- EC 2.5.1.123: flaviolin linalyltransferase
- EC 2.5.1.124: 6-linalyl-2-''O'',3-dimethylflaviolin synthase
- EC 2.5.1.125: 7-geranyloxy-5-hydroxy-2-methoxy-3-methylnaphthalene-1,4-dione synthase
- EC 2.5.1.126: norspermine synthase
- EC 2.5.1.127: caldopentamine synthase
- EC 2.5.1.128: N4-bis(aminopropyl)spermidine synthase
- EC 2.5.1.129: flavin prenyltransferase
- EC 2.5.1.130: 2-carboxy-1,4-naphthoquinone phytyltransferase
- EC 2.5.1.131: [[(4-(4-(2-(γ-L-glutamylamino)ethyl)phenoxymethyl)furan-2-yl)methanamine synthase|(4-{4-[2-(γ-L-glutamylamino)ethyl]phenoxymethyl}furan-2-yl)methanamine synthase]]
- EC 2.5.1.132: 3-deoxy-D-glycero-D-galacto-nonulopyranosonate 9-phosphate synthase
- EC 2.5.1.133: bacteriochlorophyll a synthase
- EC 2.5.1.134: cystathionine β-synthase (O-acetyl-L-serine)
- EC 2.5.1.135: validamine 7-phosphate valienyltransferase
- EC 2.5.1.136: 2-acylphloroglucinol 4-prenyltransferase
- EC 2.5.1.137: 2-acyl-4-prenylphloroglucinol 6-prenyltransferase
- EC 2.5.1.138: coumarin 8-geranyltransferase
- EC 2.5.1.139: umbelliferone 6-dimethylallyltransferase
- EC 2.5.1.140: N-(2-amino-2-carboxyethyl)-L-glutamate synthase
- EC 2.5.1.141: heme o synthase
- EC 2.5.1.142: nerylneryl diphosphate synthase
- EC 2.5.1.143: pyridinium-3,5-biscarboxylic acid mononucleotide synthase
- EC 2.5.1.144: S-sulfo-L-cysteine synthase (O-acetyl-L-serine-dependent)
- EC 2.5.1.145: phosphatidylglycerol—prolipoprotein diacylglyceryl transferase
- EC 2.5.1.146: 3-geranyl-3-[(Z)-2-isocyanoethenyl]indole synthase
- EC 2.5.1.147: 5-amino-6-(D-ribitylamino)uracil—L-tyrosine 4-hydroxyphenyl transferase
- EC 2.5.1.148: lycopaoctaene synthase
- EC 2.5.1.149: lycopene elongase/hydratase (flavuxanthin-forming)
- EC 2.5.1.150: lycopene elongase/hydratase (dihydrobisanhydrobacterioruberin-forming)
- EC 2.5.1.151: alkylcobalamin dealkylase
- EC 2.5.1.152: D-histidine 2-aminobutanoyltransferase
- EC 2.5.1.153: adenosine tuberculosinyltransferase

== EC 2.6: Transferring Nitrogenous Groups ==
=== EC 2.6.1: Transaminases ===
- EC 2.6.1.1: aspartate transaminase
- EC 2.6.1.2: alanine transaminase
- EC 2.6.1.3: cysteine transaminase
- EC 2.6.1.4: glycine transaminase
- EC 2.6.1.5: tyrosine transaminase
- EC 2.6.1.6: leucine transaminase
- EC 2.6.1.7: kynurenine—oxoglutarate transaminase
- EC 2.6.1.8: deleted
- EC 2.6.1.9: histidinol-phosphate transaminase
- EC 2.6.1.10: deleted, included with EC 2.6.1.21, D-amino-acid transaminase
- EC 2.6.1.11: acetylornithine transaminase
- EC 2.6.1.12: alanine—oxo-acid transaminase
- EC 2.6.1.13: ornithine aminotransferase
- EC 2.6.1.14: asparagine—oxo-acid transaminase
- EC 2.6.1.15: glutamine—pyruvate transaminase
- EC 2.6.1.16: glutamine—fructose-6-phosphate transaminase (isomerizing)
- EC 2.6.1.17: succinyldiaminopimelate transaminase
- EC 2.6.1.18: β-alanine—pyruvate transaminase
- EC 2.6.1.19: 4-aminobutyrate transaminase
- EC 2.6.1.20: deleted
- EC 2.6.1.21: D-amino-acid transaminase
- EC 2.6.1.22: (S)-3-amino-2-methylpropionate transaminase
- EC 2.6.1.23: 4-hydroxyglutamate transaminase
- EC 2.6.1.24: diiodotyrosine transaminase
- EC 2.6.1.25: deleted, Now included with EC 2.6.1.24 diiodotyrosine transaminase
- EC 2.6.1.26: thyroid-hormone transaminase
- EC 2.6.1.27: tryptophan transaminase
- EC 2.6.1.28: tryptophan—phenylpyruvate transaminase
- EC 2.6.1.29: diamine transaminase
- EC 2.6.1.30: pyridoxamine—pyruvate transaminase
- EC 2.6.1.31: pyridoxamine—oxaloacetate transaminase
- EC 2.6.1.32: valine—3-methyl-2-oxovalerate transaminase
- EC 2.6.1.33: dTDP-4-amino-4,6-dideoxy-D-glucose transaminase
- EC 2.6.1.34: UDP-N-acetylbacillosamine transaminase
- EC 2.6.1.35: glycine—oxaloacetate transaminase
- EC 2.6.1.36: L-lysine 6-transaminase
- EC 2.6.1.37: (2-aminoethyl)phosphonate—pyruvate transaminase
- EC 2.6.1.38: histidine transaminase
- EC 2.6.1.39: 2-aminoadipate transaminase
- EC 2.6.1.40: (R)-3-amino-2-methylpropionate—pyruvate transaminase
- EC 2.6.1.41: D-methionine—pyruvate transaminase
- EC 2.6.1.42: branched-chain-amino-acid transaminase
- EC 2.6.1.43: aminolevulinate transaminase
- EC 2.6.1.44: alanine—glyoxylate transaminase
- EC 2.6.1.45: serine—glyoxylate transaminase
- EC 2.6.1.46: diaminobutyrate—pyruvate transaminase
- EC 2.6.1.47: alanine—oxomalonate transaminase
- EC 2.6.1.48: 5-aminovalerate transaminase
- EC 2.6.1.49: dihydroxyphenylalanine transaminase
- EC 2.6.1.50: glutamine—scyllo-inositol transaminase
- EC 2.6.1.51: serine—pyruvate transaminase
- EC 2.6.1.52: phosphoserine transaminase
- EC 2.6.1.53: Now EC 1.4.1.13, glutamate synthase (NADPH)
- EC 2.6.1.54: pyridoxamine-phosphate transaminase
- EC 2.6.1.55: taurine—2-oxoglutarate transaminase
- EC 2.6.1.56: 1D-1-guanidino-3-amino-1,3-dideoxy-scyllo-inositol transaminase
- EC 2.6.1.57: aromatic-amino-acid transaminase
- EC 2.6.1.58: phenylalanine(histidine) transaminase
- EC 2.6.1.59: dTDP-4-amino-4,6-dideoxygalactose transaminase
- EC 2.6.1.60: aromatic-amino-acid—glyoxylate transaminase
- EC 2.6.1.61: identical to EC 2.6.1.40, (R)-3-amino-2-methylpropionate—pyruvate transaminase
- EC 2.6.1.62: adenosylmethionine—8-amino-7-oxononanoate transaminase
- EC 2.6.1.63: kynurenine—glyoxylate transaminase
- EC 2.6.1.64: glutamine—phenylpyruvate transaminase
- EC 2.6.1.65: N^{6}-acetyl-β-lysine transaminase
- EC 2.6.1.66: valine—pyruvate transaminase
- EC 2.6.1.67: 2-aminohexanoate transaminase
- EC 2.6.1.68: Now classified as EC 2.6.1.13, ornithine aminotransferase and EC 2.6.1.36, L-lysine 6-transaminase
- EC 2.6.1.69: identical to EC 2.6.1.11, ((acetylornithine transaminase))|identical to EC 2.6.1.11, acetylornithine transaminase
- EC 2.6.1.70: aspartate—phenylpyruvate transaminase
- EC 2.6.1.71: lysine—pyruvate 6-transaminase
- EC 2.6.1.72: D-4-hydroxyphenylglycine transaminase
- EC 2.6.1.73: methionine—glyoxylate transaminase
- EC 2.6.1.74: cephalosporin-C transaminase
- EC 2.6.1.75: cysteine-conjugate transaminase
- EC 2.6.1.76: diaminobutyrate—2-oxoglutarate transaminase
- EC 2.6.1.77: taurine—pyruvate aminotransferase
- EC 2.6.1.78: aspartate—prephenate aminotransferase
- EC 2.6.1.79: glutamate—prephenate aminotransferase
- EC 2.6.1.80: nicotianamine aminotransferase
- EC 2.6.1.81: succinylornithine transaminase
- EC 2.6.1.82: putrescine aminotransferase
- EC 2.6.1.83: LL-diaminopimelate aminotransferase
- EC 2.6.1.84: arginine—pyruvate transaminase
- EC 2.6.1.85: aminodeoxychorismate synthase
- EC 2.6.1.86: 2-amino-4-deoxychorismate synthase
- EC 2.6.1.87: UDP-4-amino-4-deoxy-L-arabinose aminotransferase
- EC 2.6.1.88: methionine transaminase
- EC 2.6.1.89: dTDP-3-amino-3,6-dideoxy-α-D-glucopyranose transaminase
- EC 2.6.1.90: dTDP-3-amino-3,6-dideoxy-α-D-galactopyranose transaminase
- EC 2.6.1.91: Identical to EC 2.6.1.34, UDP-N-acetylbacillosamine transaminase
- EC 2.6.1.92: UDP-4-amino-4,6-dideoxy-N-acetyl-β-L-altrosamine transaminase
- EC 2.6.1.93: neamine transaminase
- EC 2.6.1.94: 2′-deamino-2′-hydroxyneamine transaminase
- EC 2.6.1.95: neomycin C transaminase
- EC 2.6.1.96: 4-aminobutyrate—pyruvate transaminase
- EC 2.6.1.97: archaeosine synthase
- EC 2.6.1.98: UDP-2-acetamido-2-deoxy-ribo-hexuluronate aminotransferase
- EC 2.6.1.99: L-tryptophan—pyruvate aminotransferase
- EC 2.6.1.100: L-glutamine:2-deoxy-scyllo-inosose aminotransferase
- EC 2.6.1.101: L-glutamine:3-amino-2,3-dideoxy-scyllo-inosose aminotransferase
- EC 2.6.1.102: GDP-perosamine synthase
- EC 2.6.1.103: (''S'')-3,5-dihydroxyphenylglycine transaminase
- EC 2.6.1.104: 3-dehydro-glucose-6-phosphate—glutamate transaminase
- EC 2.6.1.105: lysine—8-amino-7-oxononanoate transaminase
- EC 2.6.1.106: dTDP-3-amino-3,4,6-trideoxy-α-D-glucose transaminase
- EC 2.6.1.107: β-methylphenylalanine transaminase
- EC 2.6.1.108: (5-formylfuran-3-yl)methyl phosphate transaminase
- EC 2.6.1.109: 8-amino-3,8-dideoxy-α-D-manno-octulosonate transaminase
- EC 2.6.1.110: dTDP-4-dehydro-2,3,6-trideoxy-D-glucose 4-aminotransferase
- EC 2.6.1.111: 3-aminobutanoyl-CoA transaminase
- EC 2.6.1.112: (''S'')-ureidoglycine—glyoxylate transaminase
- EC 2.6.1.113: putrescine—pyruvate transaminase
- EC 2.6.1.114: 8-demethyl-8-aminoriboflavin-5′-phosphate synthase
- EC 2.6.1.115: 5-hydroxydodecatetraenal 1-aminotransferase
- EC 2.6.1.116: 6-aminohexanoate aminotransferase
- EC 2.6.1.117: L-glutamine—4-(methylsulfanyl)-2-oxobutanoate aminotransferase
- EC 2.6.1.118: [amino-group carrier protein]-γ-(L-lysyl)-L-glutamate aminotransferase
- EC 2.6.1.119: vanillin aminotransferase

=== EC 2.6.2: Amidinotransferases (deleted sub-subclass) ===
- EC 2.6.2.1: now EC 2.1.4.1 glycine amidinotransferase

=== EC 2.6.3: Oximinotransferases ===
- EC 2.6.3.1: oximinotransferase

=== EC 2.6.99: Transferring Other Nitrogenous Groups ===
- EC 2.6.99.1: dATP(dGTP)—DNA purinetransferase
- EC 2.6.99.2: pyridoxine 5′-phosphate synthase
- EC 2.6.99.3: O-ureido-L-serine synthase
- EC 2.6.99.4: Now EC 2.3.1.234, N^{6}-L-threonylcarbamoyladenine synthase.

== EC 2.7: Transferring Phosphorus-Containing Groups ==
=== EC 2.7.1: Phosphotransferases with an alcohol group as acceptor ===
- EC 2.7.1.1: hexokinase
- EC 2.7.1.2: glucokinase
- EC 2.7.1.3: ketohexokinase
- EC 2.7.1.4: fructokinase
- EC 2.7.1.5: rhamnulokinase
- EC 2.7.1.6: galactokinase
- EC 2.7.1.7: mannokinase
- EC 2.7.1.8: glucosamine kinase
- EC 2.7.1.9: deleted
- EC 2.7.1.10: phosphoglucokinase
- EC 2.7.1.11: 6-phosphofructokinase
- EC 2.7.1.12: gluconokinase
- EC 2.7.1.13: dehydrogluconokinase
- EC 2.7.1.14: sedoheptulokinase
- EC 2.7.1.15: ribokinase
- EC 2.7.1.16: ribulokinase
- EC 2.7.1.17: xylulokinase
- EC 2.7.1.18: phosphoribokinase
- EC 2.7.1.19: phosphoribulokinase
- EC 2.7.1.20: adenosine kinase
- EC 2.7.1.21: thymidine kinase
- EC 2.7.1.22: ribosylnicotinamide kinase
- EC 2.7.1.23: NAD^{+} kinase
- EC 2.7.1.24: dephospho-CoA kinase
- EC 2.7.1.25: adenylyl-sulfate kinase
- EC 2.7.1.26: riboflavin kinase
- EC 2.7.1.27: erythritol kinase (D-erythritol 4-phosphate-forming)
- EC 2.7.1.28: triokinase
- EC 2.7.1.29: glycerone kinase
- EC 2.7.1.30: glycerol kinase
- EC 2.7.1.31: glycerate kinase
- EC 2.7.1.32: choline kinase
- EC 2.7.1.33: pantothenate kinase
- EC 2.7.1.34: pantetheine kinase
- EC 2.7.1.35: pyridoxal kinase
- EC 2.7.1.36: mevalonate kinase
- EC 2.7.1.37: now divided into EC 2.7.11.1, EC 2.7.11.8, EC 2.7.11.9, EC 2.7.11.10, EC 2.7.11.11, EC 2.7.11.12, EC 2.7.11.13, EC 2.7.11.21, EC 2.7.11.22, EC 2.7.11.24, EC 2.7.11.25, EC 2.7.11.30 and EC 2.7.12.1
- EC 2.7.1.38: now EC 2.7.11.19, phosphorylase kinase
- EC 2.7.1.39: homoserine kinase
- EC 2.7.1.40: pyruvate kinase
- EC 2.7.1.41: glucose-1-phosphate phosphodismutase
- EC 2.7.1.42: riboflavin phosphotransferase
- EC 2.7.1.43: glucuronokinase
- EC 2.7.1.44: galacturonokinase
- EC 2.7.1.45: 2-dehydro-3-deoxygluconokinase
- EC 2.7.1.46: L-arabinokinase
- EC 2.7.1.47: D-ribulokinase
- EC 2.7.1.48: uridine kinase
- EC 2.7.1.49: hydroxymethylpyrimidine kinase
- EC 2.7.1.50: hydroxyethylthiazole kinase
- EC 2.7.1.51: L-fuculokinase
- EC 2.7.1.52: fucokinase
- EC 2.7.1.53: L-xylulokinase
- EC 2.7.1.54: D-arabinokinase
- EC 2.7.1.55: allose kinase
- EC 2.7.1.56: 1-phosphofructokinase
- EC 2.7.1.57: deleted
- EC 2.7.1.58: 2-dehydro-3-deoxygalactonokinase
- EC 2.7.1.59: N-acetylglucosamine kinase
- EC 2.7.1.60: N-acylmannosamine kinase
- EC 2.7.1.61: acyl-phosphate—hexose phosphotransferase
- EC 2.7.1.62: Phosphoramidate-hexose phosphotransferase
- EC 2.7.1.63: polyphosphate—glucose phosphotransferase
- EC 2.7.1.64: inositol 3-kinase
- EC 2.7.1.65: scyllo-inosamine 4-kinase
- EC 2.7.1.66: undecaprenol kinase
- EC 2.7.1.67: 1-phosphatidylinositol 4-kinase
- EC 2.7.1.68: 1-phosphatidylinositol-4-phosphate 5-kinase
- EC 2.7.1.69: now covered by EC 2.7.1.191, EC 2.7.1.192, EC 2.7.1.193, EC 2.7.1.194, EC 2.7.1.195, EC 2.7.1.196, EC 2.7.1.197, EC 2.7.1.198, EC 2.7.1.199, EC 2.7.1.200 EC 2.7.1.20, EC 2.7.1.202, EC 2.7.1.203, EC 2.7.1.204, EC 2.7.1.205, EC 2.7.1.206, EC 2.7.1.207 and EC 2.7.1.208
- EC 2.7.1.70: Now included in EC 2.7.11.1, non-specific serine/threonine protein kinase
- EC 2.7.1.71: shikimate kinase
- EC 2.7.1.72: streptomycin 6-kinase
- EC 2.7.1.73: inosine kinase
- EC 2.7.1.74: deoxycytidine kinase
- EC 2.7.1.75: Now EC 2.7.1.21 thymidine kinase
- EC 2.7.1.76: deoxyadenosine kinase
- EC 2.7.1.77: nucleoside phosphotransferase
- EC 2.7.1.78: polynucleotide 5′-hydroxyl-kinase
- EC 2.7.1.79: diphosphate—glycerol phosphotransferase
- EC 2.7.1.80: diphosphate—serine phosphotransferase
- EC 2.7.1.81: hydroxylysine kinase
- EC 2.7.1.82: ethanolamine kinase
- EC 2.7.1.83: pseudouridine kinase
- EC 2.7.1.84: alkylglycerone kinase
- EC 2.7.1.85: β-glucoside kinase
- EC 2.7.1.86: NADH kinase
- EC 2.7.1.87: streptomycin 3′′-kinase
- EC 2.7.1.88: dihydrostreptomycin-6-phosphate 3′α-kinase
- EC 2.7.1.89: thiamine kinase
- EC 2.7.1.90: diphosphate—fructose-6-phosphate 1-phosphotransferase
- EC 2.7.1.91: sphinganine kinase
- EC 2.7.1.92: 5-dehydro-2-deoxygluconokinase
- EC 2.7.1.93: alkylglycerol kinase
- EC 2.7.1.94: acylglycerol kinase
- EC 2.7.1.95: kanamycin kinase
- EC 2.7.1.96: deleted, Now included with EC 2.7.1.86 NADH kinase
- EC 2.7.1.97: deleted, Identical with EC 2.7.11.14, rhodopsin kinase
- EC 2.7.1.98: deleted
- EC 2.7.1.99: Now EC 2.7.11.2, [pyruvate dehydrogenase (acetyl-transferring)] kinase
- EC 2.7.1.100: S-methyl-5-thioribose kinase
- EC 2.7.1.101: tagatose kinase
- EC 2.7.1.102: hamamelose kinase
- EC 2.7.1.103: viomycin kinase
- EC 2.7.1.104: Now EC 2.7.99.1, triphosphate—protein phosphotransferase
- EC 2.7.1.105: 6-phosphofructo-2-kinase
- EC 2.7.1.106: glucose-1,6-bisphosphate synthase
- EC 2.7.1.107: diacylglycerol kinase
- EC 2.7.1.108: dolichol kinase
- EC 2.7.1.109: Now EC 2.7.11.31, [hydroxymethylglutaryl-CoA reductase (NADPH)] kinase
- EC 2.7.1.110: Now EC 2.7.11.3, dephospho-(reductase kinase) kinase
- EC 2.7.1.111: Now listed as EC 2.7.11.27, [acetyl-CoA carboxylase] kinase
- EC 2.7.1.112: Now EC 2.7.10.2, non-specific protein-tyrosine kinase
- EC 2.7.1.113: deoxyguanosine kinase
- EC 2.7.1.114: AMP—thymidine kinase
- EC 2.7.1.115: Now EC 2.7.11.4, (3-methyl-2-oxobutanoate dehydrogenase (acetyl-transferring)) kinase
- EC 2.7.1.116: Now EC 2.7.11.5, [isocitrate dehydrogenase (NADP^{+})] kinase
- EC 2.7.1.117: Now EC 2.7.11.18, myosin-light-chain kinase
- EC 2.7.1.118: ADP—thymidine kinase
- EC 2.7.1.119: hygromycin-B 7′′-O-kinase
- EC 2.7.1.120: Now EC 2.7.11.17, Ca^{2+}/calmodulin-dependent protein kinase
- EC 2.7.1.121: phosphoenolpyruvate—glycerone phosphotransferase
- EC 2.7.1.122: xylitol kinase
- EC 2.7.1.123: Now EC 2.7.11.17, Ca^{2+}/calmodulin-dependent protein kinase
- EC 2.7.1.124: Now EC 2.7.11.6, [tyrosine 3-monooxygenase] kinase
- EC 2.7.1.125: Now EC 2.7.11.14, rhodopsin kinase
- EC 2.7.1.126: Now EC 2.7.11.15, β-adrenergic-receptor kinase
- EC 2.7.1.127: inositol-trisphosphate 3-kinase
- EC 2.7.1.128: Now EC 2.7.11.27, [acetyl-CoA carboxylase] kinase
- EC 2.7.1.129: Now EC 2.7.11.7, myosin-heavy-chain kinase
- EC 2.7.1.130: tetraacyldisaccharide 4′-kinase
- EC 2.7.1.131: Now EC 2.7.11.29, low-density-lipoprotein receptor kinase
- EC 2.7.1.132: Now EC 2.7.11.28, tropomyosin kinase
- EC 2.7.1.133: Now included with EC 2.7.1.134, inositol-tetrakisphosphate 1-kinase
- EC 2.7.1.134: inositol-tetrakisphosphate 1-kinase
- EC 2.7.1.135: Now EC 2.7.11.26, tau-protein kinase
- EC 2.7.1.136: macrolide 2′-kinase
- EC 2.7.1.137: phosphatidylinositol 3-kinase
- EC 2.7.1.138: ceramide kinase
- EC 2.7.1.139: Now included with EC 2.7.1.134, inositol-tetrakisphosphate 1-kinase
- EC 2.7.1.140: inositol-tetrakisphosphate 5-kinase
- EC 2.7.1.141: Now EC 2.7.11.23, [RNA-polymerase]-subunit kinase
- EC 2.7.1.142: glycerol-3-phosphate—glucose phosphotransferase
- EC 2.7.1.143: diphosphate-purine nucleoside kinase
- EC 2.7.1.144: tagatose-6-phosphate kinase
- EC 2.7.1.145: deoxynucleoside kinase
- EC 2.7.1.146: ADP-dependent phosphofructokinase
- EC 2.7.1.147: ADP-dependent glucokinase
- EC 2.7.1.148: 4-(cytidine 5′-diphospho)-2-C-methyl-D-erythritol kinase
- EC 2.7.1.149: 1-phosphatidylinositol-5-phosphate 4-kinase
- EC 2.7.1.150: 1-phosphatidylinositol-3-phosphate 5-kinase
- EC 2.7.1.151: inositol-polyphosphate multikinase
- EC 2.7.1.152: Now EC 2.7.4.21, inositol-hexakisphosphate kinase
- EC 2.7.1.153: phosphatidylinositol-4,5-bisphosphate 3-kinase
- EC 2.7.1.154: phosphatidylinositol-4-phosphate 3-kinase
- EC 2.7.1.155: Now EC 2.7.4.24, diphosphoinositol-pentakisphosphate kinase
- EC 2.7.1.156: adenosylcobinamide kinase
- EC 2.7.1.157: N-acetylgalactosamine kinase
- EC 2.7.1.158: inositol-pentakisphosphate 2-kinase
- EC 2.7.1.159: inositol-1,3,4-trisphosphate 5/6-kinase
- EC 2.7.1.160: 2′-phosphotransferase
- EC 2.7.1.161: CTP-dependent riboflavin kinase
- EC 2.7.1.162: N-acetylhexosamine 1-kinase
- EC 2.7.1.163: hygromycin B 4-O-kinase
- EC 2.7.1.164: O-phosphoseryl-tRNA^{Sec} kinase
- EC 2.7.1.165: glycerate 2-kinase
- EC 2.7.1.166: 3-deoxy-D-manno-octulosonic acid kinase
- EC 2.7.1.167: D-glycero-β-D-manno-heptose-7-phosphate kinase
- EC 2.7.1.168: D-glycero-α-D-manno-heptose-7-phosphate kinase
- EC 2.7.1.169: pantoate kinase
- EC 2.7.1.170: anhydro-N-acetylmuramic acid kinase
- EC 2.7.1.171: protein-fructosamine 3-kinase
- EC 2.7.1.172: protein-ribulosamine 3-kinase
- EC 2.7.1.173: nicotinate riboside kinase
- EC 2.7.1.174: diacylglycerol kinase (CTP dependent)
- EC 2.7.1.175: maltokinase
- EC 2.7.1.176: UDP-N-acetylglucosamine kinase
- EC 2.7.1.177: L-threonine kinase
- EC 2.7.1.178: 2-dehydro-3-deoxyglucono/galactono-kinase
- EC 2.7.1.179: kanosamine kinase
- EC 2.7.1.180: FAD:protein FMN transferase
- EC 2.7.1.181: polymannosyl GlcNAc-diphospho-''ditrans,octacis''-undecaprenol kinase
- EC 2.7.1.182: phytol kinase
- EC 2.7.1.183: glycoprotein-mannosyl O^{6}-kinase
- EC 2.7.1.184: sulfofructose kinase
- EC 2.7.1.185: mevalonate 3-kinase
- EC 2.7.1.186: mevalonate-3-phosphate 5-kinase
- EC 2.7.1.187: acarbose 7^{IV}-phosphotransferase
- EC 2.7.1.188: 2-''epi''-5-''epi''-valiolone 7-kinase
- EC 2.7.1.189: autoinducer-2 kinase
- EC 2.7.1.190: aminoglycoside 2′′-phosphotransferase
- EC 2.7.1.191: protein-N^{π}-phosphohistidine—D-mannose phosphotransferase
- EC 2.7.1.192: protein-N^{π}-phosphohistidine—N-acetylmuramate phosphotransferase
- EC 2.7.1.193: protein-N^{π}-phosphohistidine—N-acetyl-D-glucosamine phosphotransferase
- EC 2.7.1.194: protein-N^{π}-phosphohistidine—L-ascorbate phosphotransferase
- EC 2.7.1.195: protein-N^{π}-phosphohistidine—2-O-α-mannosyl-D-glycerate phosphotransferase
- EC 2.7.1.196: protein-N^{π}-phosphohistidine—N,N′-diacetylchitobiose phosphotransferase
- EC 2.7.1.197: protein-N^{π'}-phosphohistidine—D-mannitol phosphotransferase
- EC 2.7.1.198: protein-N^{π}-phosphohistidine—D-sorbitol phosphotransferase
- EC 2.7.1.199: protein-N^{π}-phosphohistidine—D-glucose phosphotransferase
- EC 2.7.1.200: protein-N^{π}-phosphohistidine—galactitol phosphotransferase
- EC 2.7.1.201: protein-N^{π}-phosphohistidine—trehalose phosphotransferase
- EC 2.7.1.202: protein-N^{π}-phosphohistidine—D-fructose phosphotransferase
- EC 2.7.1.203: protein-N^{π}-phosphohistidine—D-glucosaminate phosphotransferase
- EC 2.7.1.204: protein-N^{π}-phosphohistidine—D-galactose phosphotransferase
- EC 2.7.1.205: protein-N^{π}-phosphohistidine—cellobiose phosphotransferase
- EC 2.7.1.206: protein-N^{π}-phosphohistidine—L-sorbose phosphotransferase
- EC 2.7.1.207: protein-N^{π}-phosphohistidine—lactose phosphotransferase
- EC 2.7.1.208: protein-N^{π}-phosphohistidine—maltose phosphotransferase
- EC 2.7.1.209: L-erythrulose 1-kinase
- EC 2.7.1.210: D-erythrulose 4-kinase
- EC 2.7.1.211: protein-N^{π}-phosphohistidine—sucrose phosphotransferase
- EC 2.7.1.212: α-D-ribose-1-phosphate 5-kinase (ADP)
- EC 2.7.1.213: cytidine kinase
- EC 2.7.1.214: C_{7}-cyclitol 7-kinase
- EC 2.7.1.215: erythritol kinase (D-erythritol 1-phosphate-forming)
- EC 2.7.1.216: farnesol kinase
- EC 2.7.1.217: 3-dehydrotetronate 4-kinase
- EC 2.7.1.218: fructoselysine 6-kinase
- EC 2.7.1.219: D-threonate 4-kinase
- EC 2.7.1.220: D-erythronate 4-kinase
- EC 2.7.1.221: ''N''-acetylmuramate 1-kinase
- EC 2.7.1.222: 4-hydroxytryptamine kinase
- EC 2.7.1.223: aminoimidazole riboside kinase
- EC 2.7.1.224: cytidine diphosphoramidate kinase
- EC 2.7.1.225: L-serine kinase (ATP)
- EC 2.7.1.226: L-serine kinase (ADP)
- EC 2.7.1.227: inositol phosphorylceramide synthase
- EC 2.7.1.228: mannosyl-inositol-phosphoceramide inositolphosphotransferase
- EC 2.7.1.229: deoxyribokinase
- EC 2.7.1.230: amicoumacin kinase
- EC 2.7.1.231: 3-oxoisoapionate kinase
- EC 2.7.1.232: levoglucosan kinase
- EC 2.7.1.233: apulose kinase

=== EC 2.7.2: Phosphotransferases with a carboxy group as acceptor ===
- EC 2.7.2.1: acetate kinase
- EC 2.7.2.2: carbamate kinase
- EC 2.7.2.3: phosphoglycerate kinase
- EC 2.7.2.4: aspartate kinase
- EC 2.7.2.5: Now EC 6.3.4.16, carbamoyl-phosphate synthase (ammonia)
- EC 2.7.2.6: formate kinase
- EC 2.7.2.7: butyrate kinase
- EC 2.7.2.8: acetylglutamate kinase
- EC 2.7.2.9: Now EC 6.3.5.5, carbamoyl-phosphate synthase (glutamine-hydrolysing)
- EC 2.7.2.10: phosphoglycerate kinase (GTP)
- EC 2.7.2.11: glutamate 5-kinase
- EC 2.7.2.12: acetate kinase (diphosphate)
- EC 2.7.2.13: Now known to be due to the activities of EC 6.1.1.17, glutamate—tRNA ligase, EC 1.2.1.70, glutamyl-tRNA reductase and EC 5.4.3.8 glutamate-1-semialdehyde 2,1-aminomutase
- EC 2.7.2.14: branched-chain-fatty-acid kinase
- EC 2.7.2.15: propionate kinase
- EC 2.7.2.16: 2-phosphoglycerate kinase
- EC 2.7.2.17: [amino-group carrier protein]-L-2-aminoadipate 6-kinase
- EC 2.7.2.18: fatty acid kinase

=== EC 2.7.3: Phosphotransferases with a nitrogenous group as acceptor ===
- EC 2.7.3.1: guanidinoacetate kinase
- EC 2.7.3.2: creatine kinase
- EC 2.7.3.3: arginine kinase
- EC 2.7.3.4: taurocyamine kinase
- EC 2.7.3.5: lombricine kinase
- EC 2.7.3.6: hypotaurocyamine kinase
- EC 2.7.3.7: opheline kinase
- EC 2.7.3.8: ammonia kinase
- EC 2.7.3.9: phosphoenolpyruvate—protein phosphotransferase
- EC 2.7.3.10: agmatine kinase
- EC 2.7.3.11: now EC 2.7.13.1, protein-histidine pros-kinase
- EC 2.7.3.12: now EC 2.7.13.2, protein-histidine tele-kinase
- EC 2.7.3.13: glutamine kinase

=== EC 2.7.4: Phosphotransferases with a phosphate group as acceptor ===
- EC 2.7.4.1: ATP-polyphosphate phosphotransferase
- EC 2.7.4.2: phosphomevalonate kinase
- EC 2.7.4.3: adenylate kinase
- EC 2.7.4.4: nucleoside-phosphate kinase
- EC 2.7.4.5: deleted, now included with EC 2.7.4.14 cytidylate kinase
- EC 2.7.4.6: nucleoside-diphosphate kinase
- EC 2.7.4.7: phosphomethylpyrimidine kinase
- EC 2.7.4.8: guanylate kinase
- EC 2.7.4.9: dTMP kinase
- EC 2.7.4.10: nucleoside-triphosphate—adenylate kinase
- EC 2.7.4.11: (deoxy)adenylate kinase
- EC 2.7.4.12: T_{2}-induced deoxynucleotide kinase
- EC 2.7.4.13: (deoxy)nucleoside-phosphate kinase
- EC 2.7.4.14: cytidylate kinase
- EC 2.7.4.15: thiamine-diphosphate kinase
- EC 2.7.4.16: thiamine-phosphate kinase
- EC 2.7.4.17: 3-phosphoglyceroyl-phosphate—polyphosphate phosphotransferase
- EC 2.7.4.18: farnesyl-diphosphate kinase
- EC 2.7.4.19: 5-methyldeoxycytidine-5′-phosphate kinase
- EC 2.7.4.20: dolichyl-diphosphate—polyphosphate phosphotransferase
- EC 2.7.4.21: inositol-hexakisphosphate kinase
- EC 2.7.4.22: UMP kinase
- EC 2.7.4.23: ribose 1,5-bisphosphate phosphokinase
- EC 2.7.4.24: diphosphoinositol-pentakisphosphate kinase
- EC 2.7.4.25: (d)CMP kinase
- EC 2.7.4.26: isopentenyl phosphate kinase
- EC 2.7.4.27: [pyruvate, phosphate dikinase]-phosphate phosphotransferase
- EC 2.7.4.28: [pyruvate, water dikinase]-phosphate phosphotransferase
- EC 2.7.4.29: Kdo_{2}-lipid A phosphotransferase
- EC 2.7.4.30: Now EC 2.7.8.43, lipid A phosphoethanolamine transferase
- EC 2.7.4.31: [5-(aminomethyl)furan-3-yl]methyl phosphate kinase
- EC 2.7.4.32: farnesyl phosphate kinase
- EC 2.7.4.33: AMP-polyphosphate phosphotransferase
- EC 2.7.4.34: GDP-polyphosphate phosphotransferase

=== EC 2.7.5: Phosphotransferases with regeneration of donors, apparently catalysing intramolecular transfers ===
Deleted sub-subclass

=== EC 2.7.6: Diphosphotransferases ===
- EC 2.7.6.1: ribose-phosphate diphosphokinase
- EC 2.7.6.2: thiamine diphosphokinase
- EC 2.7.6.3: 2-amino-4-hydroxy-6-hydroxymethyldihydropteridine diphosphokinase
- EC 2.7.6.4: nucleotide diphosphokinase
- EC 2.7.6.5: GTP diphosphokinase

=== EC 2.7.7: Nucleotidyltransferases ===
- EC 2.7.7.1: nicotinamide-nucleotide adenylyltransferase
- EC 2.7.7.2: FAD synthase
- EC 2.7.7.3: pantetheine-phosphate adenylyltransferase
- EC 2.7.7.4: sulfate adenylyltransferase
- EC 2.7.7.5: sulfate adenylyltransferase (ADP)
- EC 2.7.7.6: DNA-directed RNA polymerase
- EC 2.7.7.7: DNA-directed DNA polymerase
- EC 2.7.7.8: polyribonucleotide nucleotidyltransferase
- EC 2.7.7.9: UTP—glucose-1-phosphate uridylyltransferase
- EC 2.7.7.10: UTP—hexose-1-phosphate uridylyltransferase
- EC 2.7.7.11: UTP—xylose-1-phosphate uridylyltransferase
- EC 2.7.7.12: UDP-glucose—hexose-1-phosphate uridylyltransferase
- EC 2.7.7.13: mannose-1-phosphate guanylyltransferase
- EC 2.7.7.14: ethanolamine-phosphate cytidylyltransferase
- EC 2.7.7.15: choline-phosphate cytidylyltransferase
- EC 2.7.7.16: Now EC 4.6.1.18, pancreatic ribonuclease
- EC 2.7.7.17: Now EC 4.6.1.19, ribonuclease T_{2}
- EC 2.7.7.18: nicotinate-nucleotide adenylyltransferase
- EC 2.7.7.19: polynucleotide adenylyltransferase
- EC 2.7.7.20: deleted (identical with EC 2.7.7.72, CCA tRNA nucleotidyltransferase
- EC 2.7.7.21: Now EC 2.7.7.72, CCA tRNA nucleotidyltransferase
- EC 2.7.7.22: mannose-1-phosphate guanylyltransferase (GDP)
- EC 2.7.7.23: UDP-N-acetylglucosamine diphosphorylase
- EC 2.7.7.24: glucose-1-phosphate thymidylyltransferase
- EC 2.7.7.25: Now EC 2.7.7.72, CCA tRNA nucleotidyltransferase
- EC 2.7.7.26: Now EC 4.6.1.24, ribonuclease T_{1}
- EC 2.7.7.27: glucose-1-phosphate adenylyltransferase
- EC 2.7.7.28: nucleoside-triphosphate-hexose-1-phosphate nucleotidyltransferase
- EC 2.7.7.29: identical to EC 2.7.7.28, nucleoside-triphosphate-hexose-1-phosphate nucleotidyltransferase
- EC 2.7.7.30: fucose-1-phosphate guanylyltransferase
- EC 2.7.7.31: DNA nucleotidylexotransferase
- EC 2.7.7.32: galactose-1-phosphate thymidylyltransferase
- EC 2.7.7.33: glucose-1-phosphate cytidylyltransferase
- EC 2.7.7.34: glucose-1-phosphate guanylyltransferase
- EC 2.7.7.35: ribose-5-phosphate adenylyltransferase
- EC 2.7.7.36: aldose-1-phosphate adenylyltransferase
- EC 2.7.7.37: aldose-1-phosphate nucleotidyltransferase
- EC 2.7.7.38: 3-deoxy-manno-octulosonate cytidylyltransferase
- EC 2.7.7.39: glycerol-3-phosphate cytidylyltransferase
- EC 2.7.7.40: D-ribitol-5-phosphate cytidylyltransferase
- EC 2.7.7.41: phosphatidate cytidylyltransferase
- EC 2.7.7.42: [glutamine synthetase] adenylyltransferase
- EC 2.7.7.43: N-acylneuraminate cytidylyltransferase
- EC 2.7.7.44: glucuronate-1-phosphate uridylyltransferase
- EC 2.7.7.45: guanosine-triphosphate guanylyltransferase
- EC 2.7.7.46: gentamicin 2′′-nucleotidyltransferase
- EC 2.7.7.47: streptomycin 3′′-adenylyltransferase
- EC 2.7.7.48: RNA-directed RNA polymerase
- EC 2.7.7.49: RNA-directed DNA polymerase
- EC 2.7.7.50: mRNA guanylyltransferase
- EC 2.7.7.51: adenylylsulfate—ammonia adenylyltransferase
- EC 2.7.7.52: RNA uridylyltransferase
- EC 2.7.7.53: ATP adenylyltransferase
- EC 2.7.7.54: The activity is part of EC 6.3.2.40, cyclopeptine synthase
- EC 2.7.7.55: The activity is part of EC 6.3.2.40, cyclopeptine synthase
- EC 2.7.7.56: tRNA nucleotidyltransferase
- EC 2.7.7.57: N-methylphosphoethanolamine cytidylyltransferase
- EC 2.7.7.58: Now included in EC 6.2.1.71, 2,3-dihydroxybenzoate[aryl-carrier protein] ligase
- EC 2.7.7.59: [protein-PII] uridylyltransferase
- EC 2.7.7.60: 2-C-methyl-D-erythritol 4-phosphate cytidylyltransferase
- EC 2.7.7.61: citrate lyase holo-[acyl-carrier protein] synthase
- EC 2.7.7.62: adenosylcobinamide-phosphate guanylyltransferase
- EC 2.7.7.63: Now EC 6.3.1.20, lipoate—protein ligase
- EC 2.7.7.64: UTP-monosaccharide-1-phosphate uridylyltransferase
- EC 2.7.7.65: diguanylate cyclase
- EC 2.7.7.66: malonate decarboxylase holo-[acyl-carrier protein] synthase
- EC 2.7.7.67: CDP-2,3-bis-(O-geranylgeranyl)-sn-glycerol synthase
- EC 2.7.7.68: 2-phospho-L-lactate guanylyltransferase
- EC 2.7.7.69: GDP-L-galactose/GDP-D-glucose: hexose 1-phosphate guanylyltransferase
- EC 2.7.7.70: D-glycero-β-D-manno-heptose 1-phosphate adenylyltransferase
- EC 2.7.7.71: D-glycero-α-D-manno-heptose 1-phosphate guanylyltransferase
- EC 2.7.7.72: CCA tRNA nucleotidyltransferase
- EC 2.7.7.73: sulfur carrier protein ThiS adenylyltransferase
- EC 2.7.7.74: 1L-myo-inositol 1-phosphate cytidylyltransferase
- EC 2.7.7.75: molybdopterin adenylyltransferase
- EC 2.7.7.76: molybdenum cofactor cytidylyltransferase
- EC 2.7.7.77: molybdenum cofactor guanylyltransferase
- EC 2.7.7.78: GDP-D-glucose phosphorylase
- EC 2.7.7.79: tRNA^{His} guanylyltransferase
- EC 2.7.7.80: molybdopterin-synthase adenylyltransferase
- EC 2.7.7.81: pseudaminic acid cytidylyltransferase
- EC 2.7.7.82: CMP-N,N′-diacetyllegionaminic acid synthase
- EC 2.7.7.83: UDP-N-acetylgalactosamine diphosphorylase
- EC 2.7.7.84: diadenylate cyclase
- EC 2.7.7.85: 2′-5′ oligoadenylate synthase
- EC 2.7.7.86: cyclic GMP-AMP synthase
- EC 2.7.7.87: L-threonylcarbamoyladenylate synthase
- EC 2.7.7.88: GDP polyribonucleotidyltransferase
- EC 2.7.7.89: [glutamine synthetase]-adenylyl-L-tyrosine phosphorylase
- EC 2.7.7.90: 8-amino-3,8-dideoxy-''manno''-octulosonate cytidylyltransferase
- EC 2.7.7.91: valienol-1-phosphate guanylyltransferase
- EC 2.7.7.92: 3-deoxy-D-glycero-D-galacto-nonulopyranosonate cytidylyltransferase
- EC 2.7.7.93: phosphonoformate cytidylyltransferase
- EC 2.7.7.94: Now EC 6.2.1.51, 4-hydroxyphenylalkanoate adenylyltransferase FadD29
- EC 2.7.7.95: Now EC 6.2.1.49, long-chain fatty acid adenylyltransferase FadD28
- EC 2.7.7.96: ADP-D-ribose pyrophosphorylase
- EC 2.7.7.97: 3-hydroxy-4-methylanthranilate adenylyltransferase
- EC 2.7.7.98: Now EC 6.2.1.50, 4-hydroxybenzoate adenylyltransferase FadD22
- EC 2.7.7.99: N-acetyl-α-D-muramate 1-phosphate uridylyltransferase
- EC 2.7.7.100: SAMP-activating enzyme
- EC 2.7.7.101: DNA primase DnaG
- EC 2.7.7.102: DNA primase AEP
- EC 2.7.7.103: L-glutamine-phosphate cytidylyltransferase
- EC 2.7.7.104: 2-hydroxyethylphosphonate cytidylyltransferase
- EC 2.7.7.105: phospho''enol''pyruvate guanylyltransferase
- EC 2.7.7.106: 3-phospho-D-glycerate guanylyltransferase

=== EC 2.7.8: Transferases for other substituted phosphate groups ===
- EC 2.7.8.1: diacylglycerol ethanolaminephosphotransferase
- EC 2.7.8.2: diacylglycerol cholinephosphotransferase
- EC 2.7.8.3: ceramide cholinephosphotransferase
- EC 2.7.8.4: serine ethanolaminephosphotransferase
- EC 2.7.8.5: CDP-diacylglycerol—glycerol-3-phosphate 1-phosphatidyltransferase
- EC 2.7.8.6: undecaprenyl-phosphate galactose phosphotransferase
- EC 2.7.8.7: holo-[acyl-carrier-protein] synthase
- EC 2.7.8.8: CDP-diacylglycerol—serine O-phosphatidyltransferase
- EC 2.7.8.9: phosphomannan mannosephosphotransferase
- EC 2.7.8.10: sphingosine cholinephosphotransferase
- EC 2.7.8.11: CDP-diacylglycerol—inositol 3-phosphatidyltransferase
- EC 2.7.8.12: CDP-glycerol glycerophosphotransferase
- EC 2.7.8.13: phospho-N-acetylmuramoyl-pentapeptide-transferase
- EC 2.7.8.14: CDP-ribitol ribitolphosphotransferase
- EC 2.7.8.15: UDP-N-acetylglucosamine—dolichyl-phosphate N-acetylglucosaminephosphotransferase
- EC 2.7.8.16: deleted, now included with EC 2.7.8.2 diacylglycerol cholinephosphotransferase
- EC 2.7.8.17: UDP-N-acetylglucosamine—lysosomal-enzyme N-acetylglucosaminephosphotransferase
- EC 2.7.8.18: UDP-galactose—UDP-N-acetylglucosamine galactose phosphotransferase
- EC 2.7.8.19: UDP-glucose—glycoprotein glucose phosphotransferase
- EC 2.7.8.20: phosphatidylglycerol—membrane-oligosaccharide glycerophosphotransferase
- EC 2.7.8.21: membrane-oligosaccharide glycerophosphotransferase
- EC 2.7.8.22: 1-alkenyl-2-acylglycerol choline phosphotransferase
- EC 2.7.8.23: carboxyvinyl-carboxyphosphonate phosphorylmutase
- EC 2.7.8.24: CDP-diacylglycerol—choline O-phosphatidyltransferase
- EC 2.7.8.25: Now EC 2.4.2.52, triphosphoribosyl-dephospho-CoA synthase
- EC 2.7.8.26: adenosylcobinamide-GDP ribazoletransferase
- EC 2.7.8.27: sphingomyelin synthase
- EC 2.7.8.28: 2-phospho-L-lactate transferase
- EC 2.7.8.29: L-serine-phosphatidylethanolamine phosphatidyltransferase
- EC 2.7.8.30: Now EC 2.4.2.53, undecaprenyl-phosphate 4-deoxy-4-formamido-L-arabinose transferase
- EC 2.7.8.31: undecaprenyl-phosphate glucose phosphotransferase
- EC 2.7.8.32: 3-O-α-D-mannopyranosyl-α-D-mannopyranose xylosylphosphotransferase
- EC 2.7.8.33: UDP-N-acetylglucosamine—undecaprenyl-phosphate N-acetylglucosaminephosphotransferase
- EC 2.7.8.34: CDP-L-myo-inositol myo-inositolphosphotransferase
- EC 2.7.8.35: UDP-N-acetylglucosamine—decaprenyl-phosphate N-acetylglucosaminephosphotransferase
- EC 2.7.8.36: undecaprenyl phosphate N,N′-diacetylbacillosamine 1-phosphate transferase
- EC 2.7.8.37: α-D-ribose 1-methylphosphonate 5-triphosphate synthase
- EC 2.7.8.38: archaetidylserine synthase
- EC 2.7.8.39: archaetidylinositol phosphate synthase
- EC 2.7.8.40: UDP-N-acetylgalactosamine-undecaprenyl-phosphate N-acetylgalactosaminephosphotransferase
- EC 2.7.8.41: cardiolipin synthase (CMP-forming)
- EC 2.7.8.42: Kdo_{2}-lipid A phosphoethanolamine 7′′-transferase
- EC 2.7.8.43: lipid A phosphoethanolamine transferase
- EC 2.7.8.44: teichoic acid glycerol-phosphate primase
- EC 2.7.8.45: teichoic acid glycerol-phosphate transferase
- EC 2.7.8.46: teichoic acid ribitol-phosphate primase
- EC 2.7.8.47: teichoic acid ribitol-phosphate polymerase

=== EC 2.7.9: Phosphotransferases with paired acceptors (dikinases) ===
- EC 2.7.9.1: pyruvate, phosphate dikinase
- EC 2.7.9.2: pyruvate, water dikinase
- EC 2.7.9.3: selenide, water dikinase
- EC 2.7.9.4: α-glucan, water dikinase
- EC 2.7.9.5: phosphoglucan, water dikinase
- EC 2.7.9.6: rifampicin phosphotransferase

=== EC 2.7.10: Protein-tyrosine kinases ===
- EC 2.7.10.1: receptor protein-tyrosine kinase
- EC 2.7.10.2: non-specific protein-tyrosine kinase

=== EC 2.7.11: Protein-serine/threonine kinases ===
- EC 2.7.11.1: non-specific serine/threonine protein kinase
- EC 2.7.11.2: [pyruvate dehydrogenase (acetyl-transferring)] kinase
- EC 2.7.11.3: dephospho-(reductase kinase) kinase
- EC 2.7.11.4: (3-methyl-2-oxobutanoate dehydrogenase (acetyl-transferring)) kinase
- EC 2.7.11.5: [isocitrate dehydrogenase (NADP^{+})] kinase
- EC 2.7.11.6: [tyrosine 3-monooxygenase] kinase
- EC 2.7.11.7: myosin-heavy-chain kinase
- EC 2.7.11.8: Fas-activated serine/threonine kinase
- EC 2.7.11.9: Goodpasture-antigen-binding protein kinase
- EC 2.7.11.10: IkB kinase
- EC 2.7.11.11: cAMP-dependent protein kinase
- EC 2.7.11.12: cGMP-dependent protein kinase
- EC 2.7.11.13: protein kinase C
- EC 2.7.11.14: rhodopsin kinase
- EC 2.7.11.15: β-adrenergic-receptor kinase
- EC 2.7.11.16: G-protein-coupled receptor kinase
- EC 2.7.11.17: Ca^{2+}/calmodulin-dependent protein kinase
- EC 2.7.11.18: myosin-light-chain kinase
- EC 2.7.11.19: phosphorylase kinase
- EC 2.7.11.20: elongation factor 2 kinase
- EC 2.7.11.21: polo kinase
- EC 2.7.11.22: cyclin-dependent kinase
- EC 2.7.11.23: [RNA-polymerase]-subunit kinase
- EC 2.7.11.24: mitogen-activated protein kinase
- EC 2.7.11.25: mitogen-activated protein kinase kinase kinase
- EC 2.7.11.26: tau-protein kinase
- EC 2.7.11.27: [acetyl-CoA carboxylase] kinase
- EC 2.7.11.28: tropomyosin kinase
- EC 2.7.11.29: low-density-lipoprotein receptor kinase
- EC 2.7.11.30: receptor protein serine/threonine kinase
- EC 2.7.11.31: [hydroxymethylglutaryl-CoA reductase (NADPH)] kinase
- EC 2.7.11.32: [pyruvate, phosphate dikinase] kinase
- EC 2.7.11.33: [pyruvate, water dikinase] kinase

=== EC 2.7.12: Dual-specificity kinases (those acting on Ser/Thr and Tyr residues) ===
- EC 2.7.12.1: dual-specificity kinase
- EC 2.7.12.2: mitogen-activated protein kinase kinase

=== EC 2.7.13: Protein-histidine kinases ===
- EC 2.7.13.1: protein-histidine pros-kinase
- EC 2.7.13.2: protein-histidine tele-kinase
- EC 2.7.13.3: histidine kinase

=== EC 2.7.14: Protein-arginine kinases ===
- EC 2.7.14.1: protein arginine kinase

=== EC 2.7.99: Other protein kinases ===
- EC 2.7.99.1: triphosphate—protein phosphotransferase

== EC 2.8: Transferring Sulfur-Containing Groups ==
=== EC 2.8.1: Sulfurtransferases ===
- EC 2.8.1.1: thiosulfate sulfurtransferase
- EC 2.8.1.2: 3-mercaptopyruvate sulfurtransferase
- EC 2.8.1.3: thiosulfate—thiol sulfurtransferase
- EC 2.8.1.4: tRNA sulfurtransferase
- EC 2.8.1.5: thiosulfate—dithiol sulfurtransferase
- EC 2.8.1.6: biotin synthase
- EC 2.8.1.7: cysteine desulfurase
- EC 2.8.1.8: lipoyl synthase
- EC 2.8.1.9: molybdenum cofactor sulfurtransferase
- EC 2.8.1.10: thiazole synthase
- EC 2.8.1.11: molybdopterin synthase sulfurtransferase
- EC 2.8.1.12: molybdopterin synthase
- EC 2.8.1.13: tRNA-uridine 2-sulfurtransferase
- EC 2.8.1.14: tRNA-5-taurinomethyluridine 2-sulfurtransferase
- EC 2.8.1.15: tRNA-5-methyluridine^{54} 2-sulfurtransferase
- EC 2.8.1.16: L-aspartate semialdehyde sulfurtransferase

=== EC 2.8.2: Sulfotransferases ===
- EC 2.8.2.1: aryl sulfotransferase
- EC 2.8.2.2: alcohol sulfotransferase
- EC 2.8.2.3: amine sulfotransferase
- EC 2.8.2.4: estrone sulfotransferase
- EC 2.8.2.5: chondroitin 4-sulfotransferase
- EC 2.8.2.6: choline sulfotransferase
- EC 2.8.2.7: UDP-N-acetylgalactosamine-4-sulfate sulfotransferase
- EC 2.8.2.8: [heparan sulfate]-glucosamine N-sulfotransferase
- EC 2.8.2.9: tyrosine-ester sulfotransferase
- EC 2.8.2.10: Renilla-luciferin sulfotransferase
- EC 2.8.2.11: galactosylceramide sulfotransferase
- EC 2.8.2.12: deleted, identical to EC 2.8.2.8, [heparan sulfate]-glucosamine N-sulfotransferase
- EC 2.8.2.13: psychosine sulfotransferase
- EC 2.8.2.14: bile salt sulfotransferase
- EC 2.8.2.15: steroid sulfotransferase
- EC 2.8.2.16: thiol sulfotransferase
- EC 2.8.2.17: chondroitin 6-sulfotransferase
- EC 2.8.2.18: cortisol sulfotransferase
- EC 2.8.2.19: triglucosylalkylacylglycerol sulfotransferase
- EC 2.8.2.20: protein-tyrosine sulfotransferase
- EC 2.8.2.21: keratan sulfotransferase
- EC 2.8.2.22: aryl-sulfate sulfotransferase
- EC 2.8.2.23: [heparan sulfate]-glucosamine 3-sulfotransferase 1
- EC 2.8.2.24: desulfoglucosinolate sulfotransferase
- EC 2.8.2.25: flavonol 3-sulfotransferase
- EC 2.8.2.26: quercetin-3-sulfate 3′-sulfotransferase
- EC 2.8.2.27: quercetin-3-sulfate 4′-sulfotransferase
- EC 2.8.2.28: quercetin-3,3′-bissulfate 7-sulfotransferase
- EC 2.8.2.29: [heparan sulfate]-glucosamine 3-sulfotransferase 2
- EC 2.8.2.30: [heparan sulfate]-glucosamine 3-sulfotransferase 3
- EC 2.8.2.31: petromyzonol sulfotransferase
- EC 2.8.2.32: scymnol sulfotransferase
- EC 2.8.2.33: N-acetylgalactosamine 4-sulfate 6-O-sulfotransferase
- EC 2.8.2.34: glycochenodeoxycholate sulfotransferase
- EC 2.8.2.35: dermatan 4-sulfotransferase
- EC 2.8.2.36: desulfo-A47934 sulfotransferase
- EC 2.8.2.37: trehalose 2-sulfotransferase
- EC 2.8.2.38: aliphatic desulfoglucosinolate sulfotransferase
- EC 2.8.2.39: hydroxyjasmonate sulfotransferase
- EC 2.8.2.40: ω-hydroxy-β-dihydromenaquinone-9 sulfotransferase

=== EC 2.8.3: CoA-transferases ===
- EC 2.8.3.1: propionate CoA-transferase
- EC 2.8.3.2: oxalate CoA-transferase
- EC 2.8.3.3: malonate CoA-transferase
- EC 2.8.3.4: deleted
- EC 2.8.3.5: 3-oxoacid CoA-transferase
- EC 2.8.3.6: 3-oxoadipate CoA-transferase
- EC 2.8.3.7: The activity is due to two enzymes, EC 2.8.3.22, succinyl-CoA—L-malate CoA-transferase and EC 2.8.3.20, succinyl-CoA—Dcitramalate CoA-transferase
- EC 2.8.3.8: acetate CoA-transferase
- EC 2.8.3.9: butyrate—acetoacetate CoA-transferase
- EC 2.8.3.10: citrate CoA-transferase
- EC 2.8.3.11: citramalate CoA-transferase
- EC 2.8.3.12: glutaconate CoA-transferase
- EC 2.8.3.13: succinate—hydroxymethylglutarate CoA-transferase
- EC 2.8.3.14: 5-hydroxypentanoate CoA-transferase
- EC 2.8.3.15: succinyl-CoA:(R)-benzylsuccinate CoA-transferase
- EC 2.8.3.16: formyl-CoA transferase
- EC 2.8.3.17: cinnamoyl-CoA:phenyllactate CoA-transferase
- EC 2.8.3.18: succinyl-CoA:acetate CoA-transferase
- EC 2.8.3.19: CoA:oxalate CoA-transferase
- EC 2.8.3.20: succinyl-CoA—D-citramalate CoA-transferase
- EC 2.8.3.21: L-carnitine CoA-transferase
- EC 2.8.3.22: succinyl-CoA—L-malate CoA-transferase
- EC 2.8.3.23: caffeate CoA-transferase
- EC 2.8.3.24: (''R'')-2-hydroxy-4-methylpentanoate CoA-transferase
- EC 2.8.3.25: bile acid CoA-transferase
- EC 2.8.3.26: succinyl-CoA:mesaconate CoA transferase

=== EC 2.8.4: Transferring alkylthio groups ===
- EC 2.8.4.1: coenzyme-B sulfoethylthiotransferase
- EC 2.8.4.2: arsenate-mycothiol transferase
- EC 2.8.4.3: tRNA-2-methylthio-N^{6}-dimethylallyladenosine synthase
- EC 2.8.4.4: [ribosomal protein S12] (aspartate^{89}-C^{3})-methylthiotransferase
- EC 2.8.4.5: tRNA (N^{6}-L-threonylcarbamoyladenosine^{37}-C^{2})-methylthiotransferase

=== EC 2.8.5: Thiosulfotransferases ===
- EC 2.8.5.1: S-sulfo-L-cysteine synthase (3-phospho-L-serine-dependent)
- EC 2.8.5.2: L-cysteine S-thiosulfotransferase

== EC 2.9: Transferring Selenium-Containing Groups ==
=== EC 2.9.1: Selenotransferases ===
- EC 2.9.1.1: L-seryl-tRNA^{Sec} selenium transferase
- EC 2.9.1.2: O-phospho-L-seryl-tRNA^{Sec}:L-selenocysteinyl-tRNA synthase
- EC 2.9.1.3: tRNA 2-selenouridine synthase

== EC 2.10: Transferring molybdenum- or tungsten-containing groups ==
=== EC 2.10.1: Molybdenumtransferases or tungstentransferases with sulfide groups as acceptors ===
- EC 2.10.1.1: molybdopterin molybdotransferase
