= Mannosyltransferase =

Human protein

A mannosyltransferase is a type of glycosyltransferase that acts upon mannose.

An example is heteroglycan alpha-mannosyltransferase.

== Incomplete list ==
Many different enzyme classes are called mannotransferases, including:

- Glucomannan 4-beta-mannosyltransferase
- Heteroglycan alpha-mannosyltransferase
- Undecaprenyl-phosphate mannosyltransferase
- Dolichyl-phosphate beta-D-mannosyltransferase
- Dolichyl-phosphate-mannose-protein mannosyltransferase
- tRNA-queuosine beta-mannosyltransferase
- Chitobiosyldiphosphodolichol beta-mannosyltransferase
- Initiation-specific alpha-1,6-mannosyltransferase
- GDP-mannose:cellobiosyl-diphosphopolyprenol alpha-mannosyltransferase
- GDP-Man:Man2GlcNAc2-PP-dolichol alpha-1,6-mannosyltransferase
- Dolichyl-P-Man:Man5GlcNAc2-PP-dolichol alpha-1,3-mannosyltransferase
- Dolichyl-P-Man:Man6GlcNAc2-PP-dolichol alpha-1,2-mannosyltransferase
- Dolichyl-P-Man:Man8GlcNAc2-PP-dolichol alpha-1,2-mannosyltransferase
