= Peflin =

Protein found in humans

PEF1

Identifiers
- Aliases: PEF1, ABP32, PEF1A, penta-EF-hand domain containing 1
- External IDs: OMIM: 610033; MGI: 1915148; GeneCards: PEF1

Gene location (Human)
Chr.	Chromosome 1 (human)
Band	1p35.2	Start	31,629,866 bp
Band	1p35.2	End	31,644,896 bp

Gene location (Mouse)
Chr.	Chromosome 4 (mouse)
Band	4|4 D2.2	Start	129,996,351 bp
Band	4|4 D2.2	End	130,021,928 bp
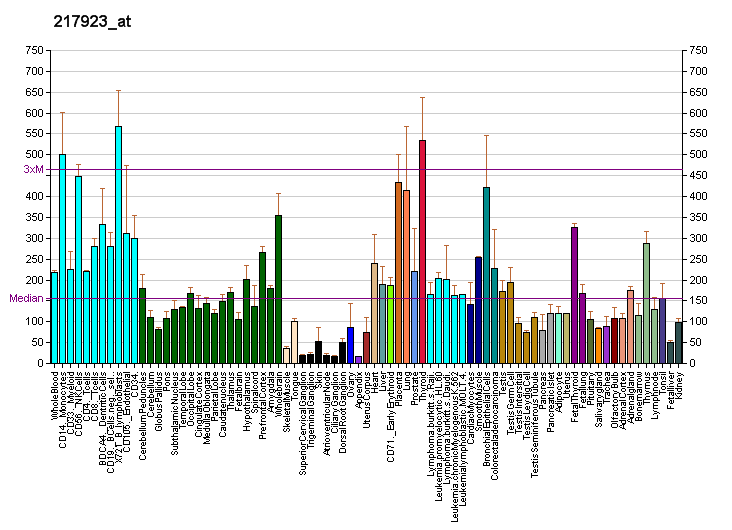
RNA expression pattern
Bgee	Human / Mouse (ortholog); Top expressed in: left lobe of thyroid gland; right lobe of thyroid gland; ascending aorta; skin of leg; skin of abdomen; popliteal artery; tibial arteries; Descending thoracic aorta; right coronary artery; left coronary artery / Top expressed in: granulocyte; right kidney; duodenum; lip; facial motor nucleus; proximal tubule; superior frontal gyrus; dentate gyrus of hippocampal formation granule cell; esophagus; muscle of thigh; More reference expression data
BioGPS	More reference expression data
Gene ontology
Molecular function	calcium ion binding; protein binding; protein dimerization activity; metal ion binding; calcium-dependent cysteine-type endopeptidase activity; protein heterodimerization activity; RNA binding; calcium-dependent protein binding; molecular adaptor activity
Cellular component	cytoplasm; extracellular exosome; membrane; Golgi membrane; COPII vesicle coat; Cul3-RING ubiquitin ligase complex; endoplasmic reticulum; ER to Golgi transport vesicle membrane; cytoplasmic vesicle
Biological process	response to calcium ion; proteolysis; endoplasmic reticulum to Golgi vesicle-mediated transport; neural crest formation; neural crest cell development; COPII vesicle coating; positive regulation of protein monoubiquitination
Sources:Amigo / QuickGO
Orthologs
Databases	NCBI: entry; OMA: entry
Species	Human	Mouse
Entrez	553115	67898
Ensembl	ENSG00000162517	ENSMUSG00000028779
UniProt	Q9UBV8	Q8BFY6
RefSeq (mRNA)	NM_012392; NM_001359651	NM_026441
RefSeq (protein)	NP_036524; NP_001346580	NP_080717
Location (UCSC)	Chr 1: 31.63 – 31.64 Mb	Chr 4: 130 – 130.02 Mb
PubMed search
- Wikidata
View/Edit Human	View/Edit Mouse

Peflin is a protein that in humans is encoded by the PEF1 gene.

PEF1 is a Ca(2+)-binding protein that belongs to the penta-EF hand (PEF) protein family, which includes the calpain small subunit (CAPNS1; MIM 114170), sorcin (SRI; MIM 182520), grancalcin (GCA; MIM 607030), and ALG2 (PDCD6; MIM 601057) (Kitaura et al., 2001).[supplied by OMIM]

== Interactions ==
PEF1 has been shown to interact with PDCD6.
