= ALG9 alpha1,2 mannosyltransferase =

ALG9 alpha1,2 mannosyltransferase, or ALG9 mannosyltransferase, may refer to:

- Dolichyl-P-Man:Man6GlcNAc2-PP-dolichol alpha-1,2-mannosyltransferase
- Dolichyl-P-Man:Man8GlcNAc2-PP-dolichol alpha-1,2-mannosyltransferase
