= Dolichylphosphomannose-dependent ALG9 mannosyltransferase =

Dolichylphosphomannose-dependent ALG9 mannosyltransferase may refer to:

- Dolichyl-P-Man:Man6GlcNAc2-PP-dolichol alpha-1,2-mannosyltransferase, an enzyme
- Dolichyl-P-Man:Man8GlcNAc2-PP-dolichol alpha-1,2-mannosyltransferase, an enzyme
