= Annexin =

Protein family

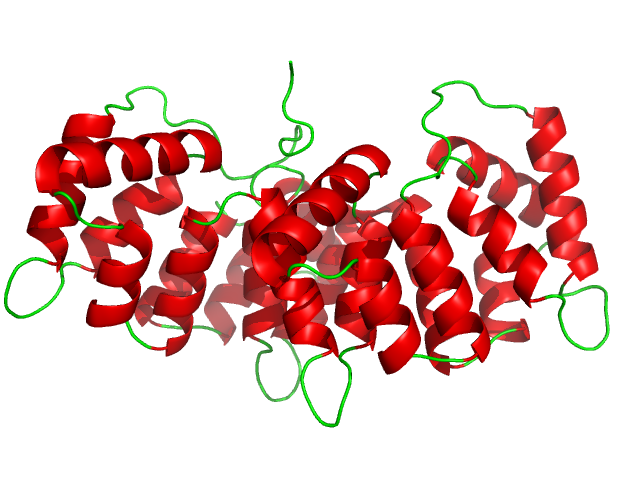
- Structure of human annexin III.

Identifiers
- Symbol: Annexin
- Pfam: PF00191
- InterPro: IPR001464
- PROSITE: PDOC00195
- SCOP2: 2ran / SCOPe / SUPFAM
- TCDB: 1.A.31
- OPM superfamily: 41
- OPM protein: 1w3w
Available protein structures:
- PDB: IPR001464 PF00191 (ECOD; PDBsum)
- AlphaFold: IPR001464; PF00191

Annexin is a common name for a group of cellular proteins. They are mostly found in eukaryotic organisms (animals, plants and fungi).

In humans, the annexins are found inside the cell. However some annexins (Annexin A1, Annexin A2, and Annexin A5) can be secreted from the cytoplasm to outside cellular environments, such as blood.

Annexin is also known as lipocortin. Lipocortins suppress phospholipase A2. Increased expression of the gene coding for annexin-1 is one of the mechanisms by which glucocorticoids (such as cortisol) inhibit inflammation.

== Introduction ==
The protein family of annexins has continued to grow since their association with intracellular membranes was first reported in 1977. The recognition that these proteins were members of a broad family first came from protein sequence comparisons and their cross-reactivity with antibodies. One of these workers (Geisow) coined the name Annexin shortly after.

As of 2002 160 annexin proteins have been identified in 65 different species. The criteria that a protein has to meet to be classified as an annexin are: it has to be capable of binding negatively charged phospholipids in a calcium-dependent manner and must contain a 70 amino acid repeat sequence called an annexin repeat. Several proteins consist of annexin with other domains like gelsolin.

The basic structure of an annexin is composed of two major domains. The first is located at the COOH-terminal and is called the “core” region. The second is located at the NH2 terminal and is called the “head” region. The core region consists of an alpha helical disk. The convex side of this disk has type 2 calcium-binding sites. They are important for allowing interaction with the phospholipids at the plasma membrane. The N terminal region is located on the concave side of the core region and is important for providing a binding site for cytoplasmic proteins. In some annexins it can become phosphorylated and can cause affinity changes for calcium in the core region or alter cytoplasmic protein interaction.

Annexins are important in various cellular and physiological processes such as providing a membrane scaffold, which is relevant to changes in the cell's shape. Also, annexins have been shown to be involved in trafficking and organization of vesicles, exocytosis, endocytosis and also calcium ion channel formation. Annexins have also been found outside the cell in the extracellular space and have been linked to fibrinolysis, coagulation, inflammation and apoptosis.

The first study to identify annexins was published by Creutz et al. (1978). These authors used bovine adrenal glands and identified a calcium-dependent protein that was responsible for aggregation of granules amongst each other and the plasma membrane. This protein was given the name synexin, which comes from the Greek word “synexis” meaning “meeting”.

== Structure ==
Several subfamilies of annexins have been identified based on structural and functional differences. However, all annexins share a common organizational theme that involves two distinct regions, an annexin core and an amino (N)-terminus. The annexin core is highly conserved across the annexin family and the N-terminus varies greatly. The variability of the N-terminus is a physical construct for variation between subfamilies of annexins.

The 310 amino acid annexin core has four annexin repeats, each composed of 5 alpha-helices. The exception is annexin A-VI that has two annexin core domains connected by a flexible linker. A-VI was produced via duplication and fusion of the genes for A-V and A-X and therefore will not be discussed in length. The four annexin repeats produce a curved protein and allow functional differences based on the structure of the curve. The concave side of the annexin core interacts with the N-terminus and cytosolic second messengers, while the convex side of the annexin contains calcium binding sites. Each annexin core contains one type II, also known as an annexin type, calcium binding site; these binding sites are the typical location of ionic membrane interactions. However, other methods of membrane connections are possible. For example, A-V exposes a tryptophan residue, upon calcium binding, which can interact with the hydrocarbon chains of the lipid bilayer.

The diverse structure of the N-terminus confers specificity to annexin intracellular signaling. In all annexins the N-terminus is thought to sit inside the concave side of the annexin core and folds separately from the rest of the protein. The structure of this region can be divided into two broad categories, short and long N-termini. A short N-terminus, as seen in A-III, can consist of 16 or less amino acids and travels along the concave protein core interacting via hydrogen bonds. Short N-termini are thought to stabilize the annexin complex in order to increase calcium binding and can be the sites for post-translational modifications. Long N-termini can contain up to 40 residues and have a more complex role in annexin signaling. For example, in A-I the N-terminus folds into an amphipathic alpha-helix and inserts into the protein core, displacing helix D of annexin repeat III. However, when calcium binds, the N-terminus is pushed from the annexin core by conformational changes within the protein. Therefore, the N-terminus can interact with other proteins, notably the S-100 protein family, and includes phosphorylation sites which allow for further signaling. A-II can also use its long N-terminal to form a heterotrimer between a S100 protein and two peripheral annexins. The structural diversity of annexins is the grounds for the functional range of these complex, intracellular messengers.

== Cellular localization ==
=== Membrane ===
Annexins are characterized by their calcium-dependent ability to bind to negatively charged phospholipids (i.e. membrane walls). They are located in some but not all of the membranous surfaces within a cell, which would be evidence of a heterogeneous distribution of Ca^{2+} within the cell.

=== Nuclei ===
Annexin species (II,V,XI) have been found within the membranes. Tyrosine kinase activity has been shown to increase the concentrations of Annexins II,V within the nucleus. Annexin XI is predominantly located within the nucleus, and absent from the nucleoli. During prophase, annexin XI will translocate to the nuclear envelope.

=== Bone ===
Annexins are abundant in bone matrix vesicles, and are speculated to play a role in Ca^{2+} entry into vesicles during hydroxyapatite formation. The subject area has not been thoroughly studied, however it has been speculated that annexins may be involved in closing the neck of the matrix vesicle as it is endocytosed.

== Role in vesicle transport ==
=== Exocytosis ===
Annexins have been observed to play a role along the exocytotic pathway, specifically in the later stages, near or at the plasma membrane. Evidence of annexins or annexin-like proteins are involved in exocytosis has been found in lower organisms, such as the Paramecium. Through antibody recognition, there is evidence of the annexin like proteins being involved in the positioning and attachment of secretory organelles in the organism Paramecium.

Annexin VII was the first annexin to be discovered while searching for proteins that promote the contact and fusion of chromaffin granules. In Vitro studies however have shown that annexin VII does not promote the fusion of membranes, only the close attachment to one another.

=== Endocytosis ===
Annexins have been found to be involved in the transport and also sorting of endocytotic events. Annexin one is a substrate of the EGF (epidermal growth factor) tyrosine kinase which becomes phosphorylated on its N terminus when the receptor is internalized. Unique endosome targeting sequences have been found in the N terminus of annexins I and II, which would be useful in sorting of endocytotic vesicles. Annexins are present in several different endocytotic processes. Annexin VI is thought to be involved in clathrin coated budding events, while annexin II participates in both cholesteryl ester internalization and the biogenesis of multi-vesicular endosomes.

== Membrane scaffolding ==
Annexins can function as scaffolding proteins to anchor other proteins to the cell membrane. Annexins assemble as trimers, where this trimer formation is facilitated by calcium influx and efficient membrane binding. This trimer assembly is often stabilized by other membrane-bound annexin cores in the vicinity. Eventually, enough annexin trimers will assemble and bind the cell membrane. This will induce the formation of membrane-bound annexin networks. These networks can induce the indentation and vesicle budding during an exocytosis event.

While different types of annexins can function as membrane scaffolds, annexin A-V is the most abundant membrane-bound annexin scaffold. Annexin A-V can form 2-dimensional networks when bound to the phosphatidylserine unit of the membrane. Annexin A-V is effective in stabilizing changes in cell shape during endocytosis and exocytosis, as well as other cell membrane processes. Alternatively, annexins A-I and A-II bind phosphatidylserine and phosphatidylcholine units in the cell membrane, and are often found forming monolayered clusters that lack a definite shape.

In addition, annexins A-I and A-II have been shown to bind phosphatidylinositol 4,5-bisphosphate (PIP_{2}) in the cell membrane and facilitate actin assembly near the membrane. More recently, annexin scaffolding functions have been linked to medical applications. These medical implications have been uncovered with in vivo studies where the path of a fertilized egg is tracked to the uterus. After fertilization, the egg must enter a canal for which the opening is up to five times smaller than the diameter of the egg. Once the fertilized egg has passed through the opening, annexins are believed to promote membrane folding in an accordion-like fashion to return the stretched membrane back to its original form. Though this was discovered in the nematode annexin NEX-1, it is believed that a similar mechanism takes place in humans and other mammals.

=== Membrane organization and trafficking ===
Several annexins have been shown to have active roles in the organization of the membrane. Annexin A-II has been extensively studied in this aspect of annexin function and is noted to be heavily involved in the organization of lipids in the bilayer near sites of actin cytoskeleton assembly. Annexin A-II can bind PIP_{2} in the cell membrane in vivo with a relatively high binding affinity.

In addition, Annexin A-II can bind other membrane lipids such as cholesterol, where this binding is made possible by the influx of calcium ions. The binding of Annexin A-II to lipids in the bilayer orchestrates the organization of lipid rafts in the bilayer at sites of actin assembly. In fact, annexin A-II is itself an actin-binding protein and therefore it can form a region of interaction with actin by means of its filamentous actin properties. In turn, this allows for further cell-cell interactions between monolayers of cells like epithelial and endothelial cells. In addition to annexin A-II, annexin A-XI has also been shown to organize cell membrane properties. Annexin A-XI is believed to be highly involved in the last stage of mitosis: cytokinesis. It is in this stage that daughter cells separate from one another because annexin A-XI inserts a new membrane that is believed to be required for abscission. Without annexin A-XI, it is believed that the daughter cells with not fully separate and may undergo apoptosis.

== Clinical significance ==
=== Apoptosis and inflammation ===
Annexin A-I seems to be one of the most heavily involved annexins in anti-inflammatory responses. Upon infection or damage to tissues, annexin A-I is believed to reduce inflammation of tissues by interacting with annexin A-I receptors on leukocytes. In turn, the activation of these receptors functions to send the leukocytes to the site of infection and target the source of inflammation directly. As a result, this inhibits leukocyte (specifically neutrophils) extravasation and down regulates the magnitude of the inflammatory response. Without annexin A-I in mediating this response, neutrophil extravasation is highly active and worsens the inflammatory response in damaged or infected tissues.

Annexin A-I has also been implicated in apoptotic mechanisms in the cell. When expressed on the surface of neutrophils, annexin A-I promotes pro-apoptotic mechanisms. Alternatively, when expressed on the cell surface, annexin A-I promotes the removal of cells that have undergone apoptosis.

Moreover, annexin A-I has further medical implications in the treatment of cancer. Annexin A-I can be used as a cell surface protein to mark some forms of tumors that can be targeted by various immunotherapies with antibodies against annexin A-I.

=== Coagulation ===
Annexin A-V is the major player when it comes to mechanisms of coagulation. Like other annexin types, annexin A-V can also be expressed on the cell surface and can function to form 2-dimensional crystals to protect the lipids of the cell membrane from involvement in coagulation mechanisms. Medically speaking, phospholipids can often be recruited in autoimmune responses, most commonly observed in cases of fetal loss during pregnancy. In such cases, antibodies against annexin A-V destroy its 2-dimensional crystal structure and uncover the phospholipids in the membrane, making them available for contribution to various coagulation mechanisms.

=== Fibrinolysis ===
While several annexins may be involved in mechanisms of fibrinolysis, annexin A-II is the most prominent in mediating these responses. The expression of annexin A-II on the cell surface is believed to serve as a receptor for plasminogen, which functions to produce plasmin. Plasmin initiates fibrinolysis by degrading fibrin. The destruction of fibrin is a natural preventative measure because it prevents the formation of blood clots by fibrin networks.

Annexin A-II has medical implications because it can be utilized in treatments for various cardiovascular diseases that thrive on blood clotting through fibrin networks.

== Types/subfamilies ==
- Annexin, type I InterPro: IPR002388
- Annexin, type II InterPro: IPR002389
- Annexin, type III InterPro: IPR002390
- Annexin, type IV InterPro: IPR002391
- Annexin, type V InterPro: IPR002392
- Annexin, type VI InterPro: IPR002393
- Alpha giardin InterPro: IPR008088
- Annexin, type X InterPro: IPR008156
- Annexin, type VIII InterPro: IPR009115
- Annexin, type XXXI InterPro: IPR009116
- Annexin, type fungal XIV InterPro: IPR009117
- Annexin, type plant InterPro: IPR009118
- Annexin, type XIII InterPro: IPR009166
- Annexin, type VII InterPro: IPR013286
- Annexin like protein InterPro: IPR015472
- Annexin XI InterPro: IPR015475

== Human proteins containing this domain ==
ANXA1; ANXA2; ANXA3; ANXA4; ANXA5; ANXA6; ANXA7; ANXA8; ANXA8L1; ANXA9; ANXA10; ANXA11; ANXA13;
