= Alg2 mannosyltransferase =

Alg2 mannosyltransferase may refer to:

- GDP-Man:Man2GlcNAc2-PP-dolichol alpha-1,6-mannosyltransferase, an enzyme
- Glycolipid 3-alpha-mannosyltransferase, an enzyme
