= GDP-D-glucose phosphorylase =

Class of enzymes

Identifiers
- EC no.: 2.7.7.78

Databases
- IntEnz: IntEnz view
- BRENDA: BRENDA entry
- ExPASy: NiceZyme view
- KEGG: KEGG entry
- MetaCyc: metabolic pathway
- PRIAM: profile
- PDB structures: RCSB PDB PDBe PDBsum
Search
- PMC: articles
- PubMed: articles
- NCBI: proteins

GDP-D-glucose phosphorylase (EC 2.7.7.78) is an enzyme with systematic name GDP:alpha-D-glucose 1-phosphate guanylyltransferase. It catalyses the following chemical reaction:

GDP-α-D-glucose
P_{i}
glucose 1-phosphate
+
guanosine diphosphate

The enzyme characterised from Caenorhabditis elegans helps prevent the misincorporation of glucose in place of mannose residues into glycoconjugates by removing any GDP-glucose present. This compound may arise because the biosynthesis of ascorbic acid requires the enzyme GDP-L-galactose phosphorylase but this can give the unwanted GDP-glucose as well as its main product, GDP-β-L-galactose.
