= Mannose-1-phosphate guanylyltransferase (GDP) =

Class of enzyme

Identifiers
- EC no.: 2.7.7.22
- CAS no.: 9026-31-7

Databases
- IntEnz: IntEnz view
- BRENDA: BRENDA entry
- ExPASy: NiceZyme view
- KEGG: KEGG entry
- MetaCyc: metabolic pathway
- PRIAM: profile
- PDB structures: RCSB PDB PDBe PDBsum
- Gene Ontology: AmiGO / QuickGO
Search
- PMC: articles
- PubMed: articles
- NCBI: proteins

Mannose-1-phosphate guanylyltransferase (GDP) (EC 2.7.7.22) is an enzyme that catalyzes the reversible chemical reaction:

guanosine diphosphate
+
mannose 1-phosphate
PP_{i}
PP_{i}
guanosine diphosphate mannose

The enzyme characterised from yeast combines guanosine diphosphate and mannose 1-phosphate to give guanosine diphosphate mannose, with pyrophosphate (PP_{i}) as a byproduct.

== Nomenclature ==
This enzyme is a transferase, specifically one transferring phosphorus-containing nucleotide groups (nucleotidyltransferases). The systematic name of this enzyme class is GDP:alpha-D-mannose-1-phosphate guanylyltransferase. Common names in use include:

- GDP mannose phosphorylase
- Mannose 1-phosphate (guanosine diphosphate) guanylyltransferase
- GDP mannose phosphorylase
- GDP-mannose 1-phosphate guanylyltransferase
- Guanosine diphosphate-mannose 1-phosphate guanylyltransferase
- Guanosine diphosphomannose phosphorylase
- Mannose 1-phosphate guanylyltransferase
- GDP:D-mannose-1-phosphate guanylyltransferase
