= GlcA-beta-(1-2)-D-Man-alpha-(1-3)-D-Glc-beta-(1-4)-D-Glc-alpha-1-diphospho-ditrans,octacis-undecaprenol 4-beta-mannosyltransferase =

Class of enzymes

GlcA-beta-(1->2)-D-Man-alpha-(1->3)-D-Glc-beta-(1->4)-D-Glc-alpha-1-diphospho-ditrans,octacis-undecaprenol 4-beta-mannosyltransferase

Identifiers
- EC no.: 2.4.1.251

Databases
- IntEnz: IntEnz view
- BRENDA: BRENDA entry
- ExPASy: NiceZyme view
- KEGG: KEGG entry
- MetaCyc: metabolic pathway
- PRIAM: profile
- PDB structures: RCSB PDB PDBe PDBsum
Search
- PMC: articles
- PubMed: articles
- NCBI: proteins

GlcA-beta-(1->2)-D-Man-alpha-(1->3)-D-Glc-beta-(1->4)-D-Glc-alpha-1-diphospho-ditrans,octacis-undecaprenol 4-beta-mannosyltransferase (EC 2.4.1.251, GumI) is an enzyme with systematic name GDP-mannose:GlcA-beta-(1->2)-D-Man-alpha-(1->3)-D-Glc-beta-(1->4)-D-Glc-alpha-1-diphospho-ditrans,octacis-undecaprenol 4-beta-mannosyltransferase. This enzyme catalyses the following chemical reaction

GDP-mannose + GlcA-beta-(1->2)-D-Man-alpha-(1->3)-D-Glc-beta-(1->4)-D-Glc-alpha-1-diphospho-ditrans,octacis-undecaprenol $\rightleftharpoons$ GDP + D-Man-beta-(1->4)- GlcA-beta-(1->2)-D-Man-alpha-(1->3)-D-Glc-beta-(1->4)-D-Glc-alpha-1-diphospho-ditrans,octacis-undecaprenol

The enzyme is involved in the biosynthesis of the exopolysaccharide xanthan.
