= Methyltransferase/kinase WbdD =

methyltransferase/kinase WbdD
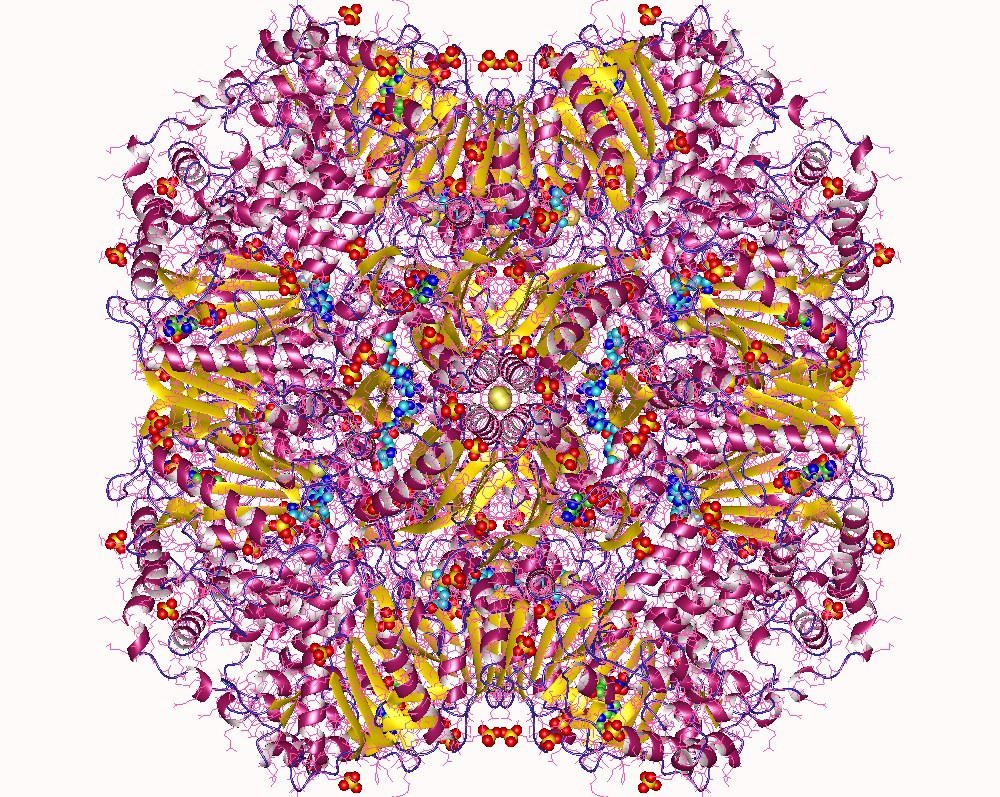
- Methyltransferase/kinase WbdD homododekamer, E.Coli

Identifiers
- EC no.: 2.1.1.294

Databases
- IntEnz: IntEnz view
- BRENDA: BRENDA entry
- ExPASy: NiceZyme view
- KEGG: KEGG entry
- MetaCyc: metabolic pathway
- PRIAM: profile
- PDB structures: RCSB PDB PDBe PDBsum
Search
- PMC: articles
- PubMed: articles
- NCBI: proteins

Methyltransferase/kinase WbdD EC 2.1.1.294 and EC 2.7.1.181 WbdD is a bifunctional enzyme that regulates the length of the LPS O-antigen polysaccharide chain. Stops the polymerization of the chain by phosphorylating and then methylating the phosphate on the terminal sugar. This terminal modification is essential for export of the O-antigen across the inner membrane. WbdD is also required for correct localization of the WbdA mannosyltransferase.

This protein is involved in the pathway LPS O-antigen biosynthesis, which is part of Bacterial outer membrane biogenesis.

Catalytic activities:

S-adenosyl-L-methionine + 3-O-phospho-alpha-D-Man-(1->2)-alpha-D-Man-(1->2)-alpha-D-Man-(1->3)-alpha-D-Man-(1->3)-(alpha-D-Man-(1->2)-alpha-D-Man-(1->2)-alpha-D-Man-(1->3)-alpha-D-Man-(1->3))(n)-alpha-D-Man-(1->3)-alpha-D-Man-(1->3)-alpha-D-GlcNAc-diphospho-ditrans,octacis-undecaprenol = S-adenosyl-L-homocysteine + 3-O-methylphospho-alpha-D-Man-(1->2)-alpha-D-Man-(1->2)-alpha-D-Man-(1->3)-alpha-D-Man-(1->3)-(alpha-D-Man-(1->2)-alpha-D-Man-(1->2)-alpha-D-Man-(1->3)-alpha-D-Man-(1->3))(n)-alpha-D-Man-(1->3)-alpha-D-Man-(1->3)-alpha-D-GlcNAc-diphospho-ditrans,octacis-undecaprenol.

ATP + alpha-D-Man-(1->2)-alpha-D-Man-(1->2)-alpha-D-Man-(1->3)-alpha-D-Man-(1->3)-(alpha-D-Man-(1->2)-alpha-D-Man-(1->2)-alpha-D-Man-(1->3)-alpha-D-Man-(1->3))(n)-alpha-D-Man-(1->3)-alpha-D-Man-(1->3)-alpha-D-GlcNAc-diphospho-ditrans,octacis-undecaprenol = ADP + 3-O-phospho-alpha-D-Man-(1->2)-alpha-D-Man-(1->2)-alpha-D-Man-(1->3)-alpha-D-Man-(1->3)-(alpha-D-Man-(1->2)-alpha-D-Man-(1->2)-alpha-D-Man-(1->3)-alpha-D-Man-(1->3))(n)-alpha-D-Man-(1->3)-alpha-D-Man-(1->3)-alpha-D-GlcNAc-diphospho-ditrans,octacis-undecaprenol.
