= Phosphomannan mannosephosphotransferase =

Class of enzymes

phosphomannan mannosephosphotransferase

Identifiers
- EC no.: 2.7.8.9
- CAS no.: 37278-31-2

Databases
- IntEnz: IntEnz view
- BRENDA: BRENDA entry
- ExPASy: NiceZyme view
- KEGG: KEGG entry
- MetaCyc: metabolic pathway
- PRIAM: profile
- PDB structures: RCSB PDB PDBe PDBsum
- Gene Ontology: AmiGO / QuickGO
Search
- PMC: articles
- PubMed: articles
- NCBI: proteins

In enzymology, a phosphomannan mannosephosphotransferase (EC 2.7.8.9) is an enzyme that catalyzes the chemical reaction

GDP-mannose + (phosphomannan)n $\rightleftharpoons$ GMP + (phosphomannan)n^{+}1

Thus, the two substrates of this enzyme are GDP-mannose and (phosphomannan)n, whereas its two products are GMP and (phosphomannan)n+1.

This enzyme belongs to the family of transferases, specifically those transferring non-standard substituted phosphate groups. The systematic name of this enzyme class is GDP-mannose:phosphomannan mannose phosphotransferase.
