= Annexin A9 =

Protein found in humans

ANXA9

Identifiers
- Aliases: ANXA9, ANX31, annexin A9
- External IDs: OMIM: 603319; MGI: 1923711; GeneCards: ANXA9

Gene location (Human)
| Chr. | Chromosome 1 (human) |
| Band | 1q21.3 | Start | 150,982,249 bp |
| Band | 1q21.3 | End | 150,995,634 bp |

Gene location (Mouse)
| Chr. | Chromosome 3 (mouse) |
| Band | 3|3 F2.1 | Start | 95,203,407 bp |
| Band | 3|3 F2.1 | End | 95,214,487 bp |
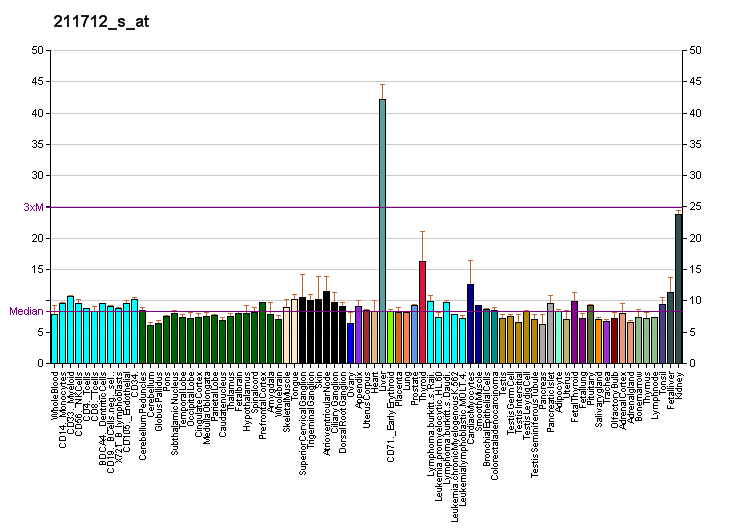

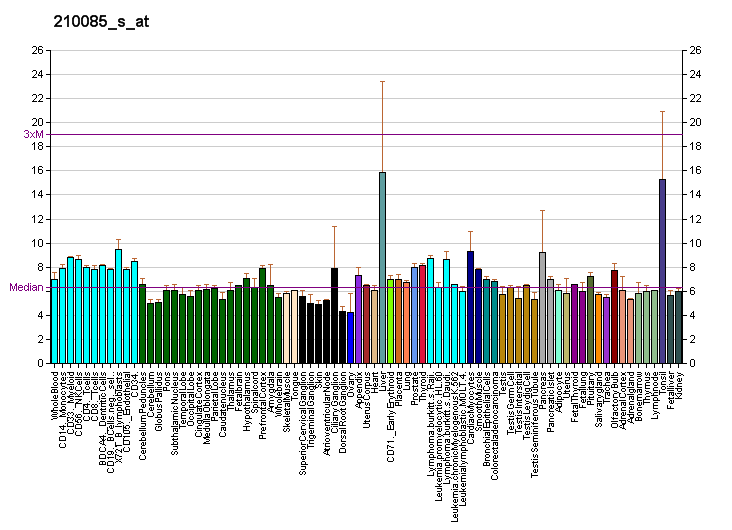
RNA expression pattern
| Bgee | Human / Mouse (ortholog); Top expressed in: body of pancreas; right lobe of liver; skin of leg; skin of abdomen; pancreatic ductal cell; testicle; amniotic fluid; C1 segment; left lobe of thyroid gland; right lobe of thyroid gland / Top expressed in: esophagus; lip; seminal vesicula; skin of back; skin of external ear; epidermis; hair follicle; renal pelvis; conjunctival fornix; vestibular membrane of cochlear duct; More reference expression data |
| BioGPS | More reference expression data |
Gene ontology
| Molecular function | calcium-dependent phospholipid binding; calcium ion binding; acetylcholine receptor activity; phosphatidylserine binding; protein binding; phospholipid binding; protein homodimerization activity |
| Cellular component | cell surface; cytosol |
| Biological process | signal transduction; cell-cell adhesion |
Sources:Amigo / QuickGO
Orthologs
| Databases | NCBI: entry; OMA: entry |
| Species | Human | Mouse |
| Entrez | 8416 | 71790 |
| Ensembl | ENSG00000143412 | ENSMUSG00000015702 |
| UniProt | O76027 | Q9JHQ0 |
| RefSeq (mRNA) | NM_003568 | NM_001085383; NM_023628; NM_001379545; NM_001379546 |
| RefSeq (protein) | NP_003559 | NP_001078852; NP_076117; NP_001366474; NP_001366475 |
| Location (UCSC) | Chr 1: 150.98 – 151 Mb | Chr 3: 95.2 – 95.21 Mb |
| PubMed search |
- Wikidata
| View/Edit Human | View/Edit Mouse |

Annexin A9 is a protein that in humans is encoded by the ANXA9 gene.

== Function ==
The annexins are a family of calcium-dependent phospholipid-binding proteins. Members of the annexin family contain 4 internal repeat domains, each of which includes a type II calcium-binding site. The calcium-binding sites are required for annexins to aggregate and cooperatively bind anionic phospholipids and extracellular matrix proteins. This gene encodes a divergent member of the annexin protein family in which all four homologous type II calcium-binding sites in the conserved tetrad core contain amino acid substitutions that ablate their function. However, structural analysis suggests that the conserved putative ion channel formed by the tetrad core is intact.
