= Glucomannan 4-beta-mannosyltransferase =

Class of enzymes

glucomannan 4-beta-mannosyltransferase

Identifiers
- EC no.: 2.4.1.32
- CAS no.: 37257-30-0

Databases
- IntEnz: IntEnz view
- BRENDA: BRENDA entry
- ExPASy: NiceZyme view
- KEGG: KEGG entry
- MetaCyc: metabolic pathway
- PRIAM: profile
- PDB structures: RCSB PDB PDBe PDBsum
- Gene Ontology: AmiGO / QuickGO
Search
- PMC: articles
- PubMed: articles
- NCBI: proteins

In enzymology, a glucomannan 4-beta-mannosyltransferase (EC 2.4.1.32) is an enzyme that catalyzes the chemical reaction

GDP-mannose + (glucomannan)_{n} $\rightleftharpoons$ GDP + (glucomannan)_{n+1}

Thus, the two substrates of this enzyme are GDP-mannose and (glucomannan)n, whereas its two products are GDP and (glucomannan)n+1, a noncellulosic polysaccharide which is used in the formation of cell walls.

This enzyme belongs to the family of glycosyltransferases, specifically the hexosyltransferases. The systematic name of this enzyme class is GDPmannose:glucomannan 1,4-beta-D-mannosyltransferase. Other names in common use include GDP-man-beta-mannan manosyltransferase, and glucomannan-synthase.
