= Mannose-1-phosphate guanylyltransferase =

Class of enzyme

Identifiers
- EC no.: 2.7.7.13
- CAS no.: 37278-24-3

Databases
- IntEnz: IntEnz view
- BRENDA: BRENDA entry
- ExPASy: NiceZyme view
- KEGG: KEGG entry
- MetaCyc: metabolic pathway
- PRIAM: profile
- PDB structures: RCSB PDB PDBe PDBsum
- Gene Ontology: AmiGO / QuickGO
Search
- PMC: articles
- PubMed: articles
- NCBI: proteins

Mannose-1-phosphate guanylyltransferase (EC 2.7.7.13) is an enzyme that catalyzes the chemical reaction

guanosine triphosphate
+
mannose 1-phosphate
PP_{i}
guanosine diphosphate mannose

The enzyme characterised from Arthrobacter combines guanosine triphosphate and mannose 1-phosphate to give guanosine diphosphate galactose, with pyrophosphate (PP_{i}) as a byproduct.

This enzyme is a transferases, specifically one transferring phosphorus-containing nucleotide groups (nucleotidyltransferases). The systematic name of this enzyme class is GTP:alpha-D-mannose-1-phosphate guanylyltransferase. Other names in common use include GTP-mannose-1-phosphate guanylyltransferase, PIM-GMP (phosphomannose isomerase-guanosine 5'-diphospho-D-mannose, pyrophosphorylase), GDP-mannose pyrophosphorylase, guanosine 5'-diphospho-D-mannose pyrophosphorylase, guanosine diphosphomannose pyrophosphorylase, guanosine triphosphate-mannose 1-phosphate guanylyltransferase, and mannose 1-phosphate guanylyltransferase (guanosine triphosphate).

== Structural studies ==
As of late 2007, only one structure has been solved for this class of enzymes, with the PDB accession code PDB: 2CU2.
