= Grancalcin =

Protein found in humans

GCA

Identifiers
- Aliases: GCA, GCL, grancalcin
- External IDs: OMIM: 607030; MGI: 1918521; GeneCards: GCA
Available structures
PDB	Ortholog search: PDBe RCSB
PDB	List of PDB id codes 1F4O, 1F4Q, 1K94, 1K95

Gene location (Human)
Chr.	Chromosome 2 (human)
Band	2q24.2	Start	162,318,840 bp
Band	2q24.2	End	162,371,595 bp

Gene location (Mouse)
Chr.	Chromosome 2 (mouse)
Band	2|2 C1.3	Start	62,494,629 bp
Band	2|2 C1.3	End	62,524,453 bp
RNA expression pattern
Bgee	Human / Mouse (ortholog); Top expressed in: monocyte; blood; bone marrow; bone marrow cell; trabecular bone; granulocyte; spleen; germinal epithelium; C1 segment; right lung / Top expressed in: granulocyte; lumbar spinal ganglion; morula; pineal gland; primary motor cortex; olfactory epithelium; seminal vesicula; sciatic nerve; ventricular zone; retinal pigment epithelium; More reference expression data
BioGPS	More reference expression data
Gene ontology
Molecular function	protein binding; protein homodimerization activity; metal ion binding; calcium-dependent cysteine-type endopeptidase activity; protein heterodimerization activity; calcium ion binding
Cellular component	plasma membrane; extracellular exosome; membrane; extracellular region; cytosol; azurophil granule lumen; cytoplasm
Biological process	membrane fusion; proteolysis; neutrophil degranulation
Sources:Amigo / QuickGO
Orthologs
Databases	NCBI: entry; OMA: entry
Species	Human	Mouse
Entrez	25801	227960
Ensembl	ENSG00000115271	ENSMUSG00000026893
UniProt	P28676	Q8VC88
RefSeq (mRNA)	NM_012198; NM_001330265; NM_001330266; NM_001330267; NM_001330268 NM_001330270; NM_001330271	NM_145523
RefSeq (protein)	NP_001317194; NP_001317195; NP_001317196; NP_001317197; NP_001317199 NP_001317200; NP_036330	NP_663498
Location (UCSC)	Chr 2: 162.32 – 162.37 Mb	Chr 2: 62.49 – 62.52 Mb
PubMed search
- Wikidata
View/Edit Human	View/Edit Mouse

Grancalcin is a protein that in humans is encoded by the GCA gene.

This gene product, grancalcin, is a calcium-binding protein abundant in neutrophils and macrophages. It belongs to the penta-EF-hand subfamily of proteins which includes sorcin, calpain, and ALG-2. Grancalcin localization is dependent upon calcium and magnesium. In the absence of divalent cation, grancalcin localizes to the cytosolic fraction; with magnesium alone, it partitions with the granule fraction; and in the presence of magnesium and calcium, it associates with both the granule and membrane fractions, suggesting a role for grancalcin in granule-membrane fusion and degranulation.

== Interactions ==
GCA (gene) has been shown to interact with SRI.
