= Annexin A7 =

Protein-coding gene in the species Homo sapiens

ANXA7

Identifiers
- Aliases: ANXA7, ANX7, SNX, SYNEXIN, annexin A7
- External IDs: OMIM: 186360; MGI: 88031; GeneCards: ANXA7

Gene location (Human)
Chr.	Chromosome 10 (human)
Band	10q22.2	Start	73,375,101 bp
Band	10q22.2	End	73,414,076 bp

Gene location (Mouse)
Chr.	Chromosome 14 (mouse)
Band	14 A3|14 11.53 cM	Start	20,505,328 bp
Band	14 A3|14 11.53 cM	End	20,530,201 bp
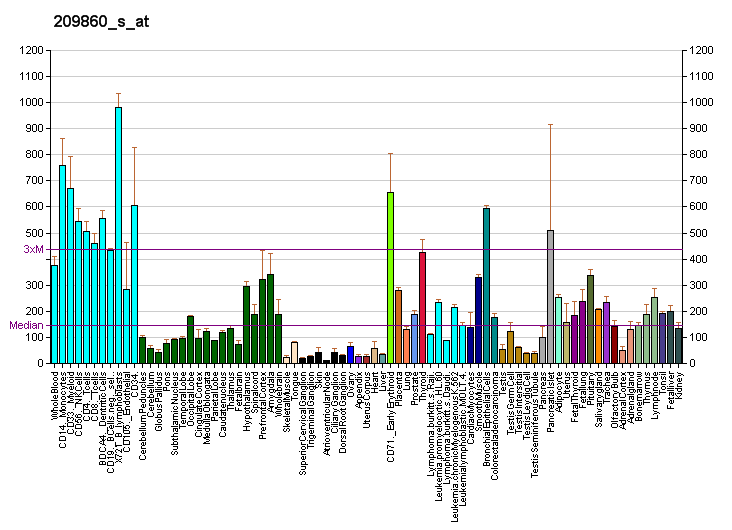

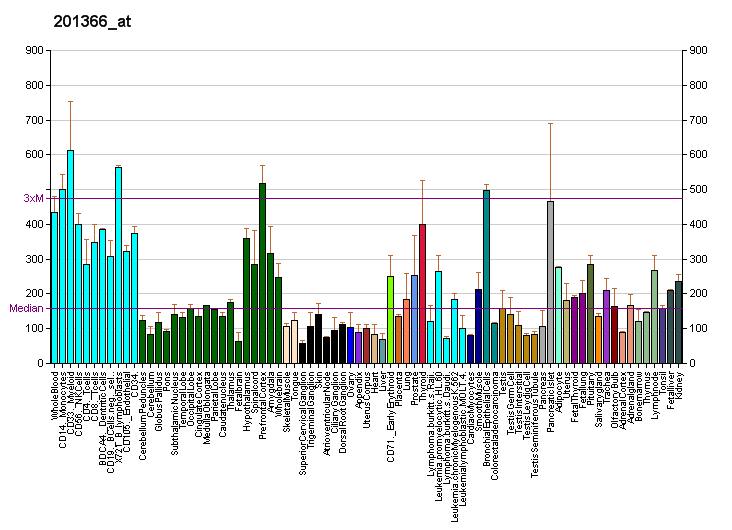
RNA expression pattern
Bgee	Human / Mouse (ortholog); Top expressed in: oocyte; islet of Langerhans; secondary oocyte; beta cell; tendon; tail of epididymis; Achilles tendon; gastrocnemius muscle; right coronary artery; mucosa of paranasal sinus / Top expressed in: skin of external ear; lacrimal gland; stroma of bone marrow; endothelial cell of lymphatic vessel; epithelium of stomach; primary oocyte; esophagus; mucous cell of stomach; lip; ankle; More reference expression data
BioGPS	More reference expression data
Gene ontology
Molecular function	calcium ion binding; calcium-dependent protein binding; integrin binding; protein binding; calcium-dependent phospholipid binding; RNA binding; identical protein binding
Cellular component	vesicle; cytosol; nuclear envelope; endoplasmic reticulum membrane; membrane; plasma membrane; chromaffin granule membrane; extracellular exosome; nucleus; collagen-containing extracellular matrix
Biological process	hemostasis; epithelial cell differentiation; response to organic cyclic compound; response to salt stress; cellular calcium ion homeostasis; membrane fusion; negative regulation of gene expression; autophagy; response to calcium ion; regulation of cell shape; social behavior; cellular water homeostasis; cell population proliferation
Sources:Amigo / QuickGO
Orthologs
Databases	NCBI: entry; OMA: entry
Species	Human	Mouse
Entrez	310	11750
Ensembl	ENSG00000138279	ENSMUSG00000021814
UniProt	P20073	Q07076
RefSeq (mRNA)	NM_001156; NM_004034; NM_001320879; NM_001320880	NM_001110794; NM_009674; NM_001374757
RefSeq (protein)	NP_001147; NP_001307808; NP_001307809; NP_004025	NP_001104264; NP_033804; NP_001361686
Location (UCSC)	Chr 10: 73.38 – 73.41 Mb	Chr 14: 20.51 – 20.53 Mb
PubMed search
- Wikidata
View/Edit Human	View/Edit Mouse

Annexin A7 is a protein that in humans is encoded by the ANXA7 gene.

Annexin VII is a member of the annexin family of calcium-dependent phospholipid binding proteins. The Annexin VII gene contains 14 exons and spans approximately 34 kb of DNA. An alternatively spliced cassette exon results in two mRNA transcripts of 2.0 and 2.4 kb which are predicted to generate two protein isoforms differing in their N-terminal domain. The alternative splicing event is tissue specific and the mRNA containing the cassette exon is prevalent in brain, heart and skeletal muscle. The transcripts also differ in their 3'-non coding regions by the use of two alternative poly(A) signals. The selection of poly(A) signals is independent of the mRNA splicing pattern. ~Annexin VII encodes a protein with a molecular weight of approximately 51 kDa with a unique, highly hydrophobic N-terminal domain of 167 amino acids and a conserved C-terminal region of 299 amino acids. The latter domain is composed of alternating hydrophobic and hydrophilic segments. Structural analysis of the protein suggests that Annexin VII is a membrane binding protein with diverse properties including voltage-sensitive calcium channel activity, ion selectivity and membrane fusion.

== Function ==
Suppresses tumor and tumorigenesis and metastasis.

== Interactions ==
ANXA7 has been shown to interact with PDCD6 and SRI.
