= PDCD6IP =

Protein-coding gene in the species Homo sapiens

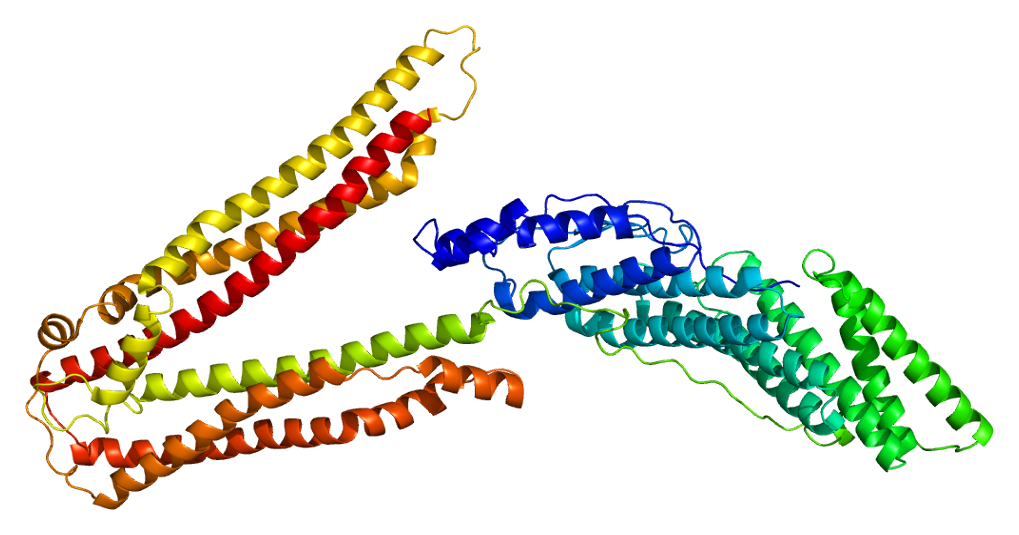

Identifiers
- Aliases: PDCD6IP, AIP1, ALIX, DRIP4, HP95, programmed cell death 6 interacting protein
- External IDs: OMIM: 608074; MGI: 1333753; GeneCards: PDCD6IP
Available structures
PDB	Ortholog search: PDBe RCSB
PDB	List of PDB id codes 2OEV, 2OEW, 2OEX, 2OJQ, 2R02, 2R03, 2R05, 2XS1, 2XS8, 2ZNE, 3C3O, 3C3Q, 3C3R, 3E1R, 3WUV, 4JJY

Gene location (Human)
Chr.	Chromosome 3 (human)
Band	3p22.3	Start	33,798,571 bp
Band	3p22.3	End	33,869,707 bp

Gene location (Mouse)
Chr.	Chromosome 9 (mouse)
Band	9|9 F3	Start	113,480,812 bp
Band	9|9 F3	End	113,537,327 bp
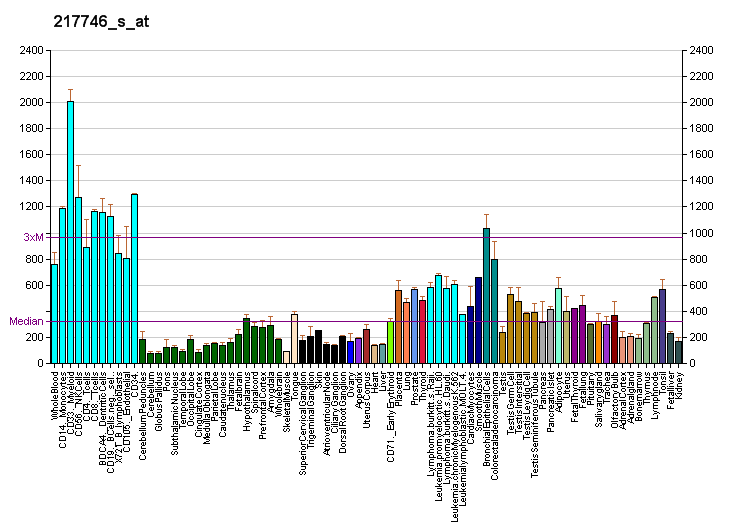
RNA expression pattern
Bgee	Human / Mouse (ortholog); Top expressed in: Achilles tendon; tibial nerve; stromal cell of endometrium; rectum; mucosa of colon; gastric mucosa; jejunal mucosa; skin of leg; monocyte; mucosa of sigmoid colon / Top expressed in: tail of embryo; genital tubercle; lip; vestibular membrane of cochlear duct; granulocyte; esophagus; thymus; stroma of bone marrow; gastrula; epithelium of stomach; More reference expression data
BioGPS	More reference expression data
Gene ontology
Molecular function	protein homodimerization activity; protein binding; protein dimerization activity; proteinase activated receptor binding; calcium-dependent protein binding
Cellular component	immunological synapse; focal adhesion; microtubule organizing center; extracellular vesicle; endoplasmic reticulum exit site; extracellular region; myelin sheath; cytoskeleton; melanosome; membrane; extracellular exosome; cytoplasm; cytosol; actomyosin; bicellular tight junction; cell junction; Flemming body
Biological process	cell cycle; mitotic metaphase plate congression; protein transport; positive regulation of exosomal secretion; viral life cycle; regulation of mitotic spindle assembly; ubiquitin-independent protein catabolic process via the multivesicular body sorting pathway; positive regulation of extracellular exosome assembly; septum digestion after cytokinesis; regulation of centrosome duplication; nucleus organization; multivesicular body assembly; regulation of extracellular exosome assembly; apoptotic process; cell division; viral budding via host ESCRT complex; viral process; actomyosin contractile ring assembly; maintenance of epithelial cell apical/basal polarity; bicellular tight junction assembly; regulation of membrane permeability; mitotic cytokinesis; viral budding; protein homooligomerization; transport; midbody abscission
Sources:Amigo / QuickGO
Orthologs
Databases	NCBI: entry; OMA: entry
Species	Human	Mouse
Entrez	10015	18571
Ensembl	ENSG00000170248	ENSMUSG00000032504
UniProt	Q8WUM4	Q9WU78
RefSeq (mRNA)	NM_001162429; NM_001256192; NM_013374	NM_001164677; NM_001164678; NM_011052
RefSeq (protein)	NP_001155901; NP_001243121; NP_037506	NP_001158149; NP_001158150; NP_035182
Location (UCSC)	Chr 3: 33.8 – 33.87 Mb	Chr 9: 113.48 – 113.54 Mb
PubMed search
- Wikidata
View/Edit Human	View/Edit Mouse

Programmed cell death 6-interacting protein also known as ALIX is a protein that in humans is encoded by the PDCD6IP gene.

This gene encodes a protein thought to participate in programmed cell death. Studies using mouse cells have shown that overexpression of this protein can block apoptosis. In addition, the product of this gene binds to the product of the PDCD6 gene, a protein required for apoptosis, in a calcium-dependent manner. This gene product also binds to endophilins, proteins that regulate membrane shape during endocytosis. Overexpression of this gene product and endophilins results in cytoplasmic vacuolization which may be partly responsible for the protection against cell death.

== Function ==
PDCD6IP protein is part of ESCRT pathway. It participates in the membrane scission of the revers topology budding and participates in multivesicular body formation. It is also vital at the later stages and for successful completion of cytokinesis.

== Interactions ==
PDCD6IP has been shown to interact with PDCD6. The V domain of PDCD6IP recognises Short linear motif LYPxLxxL and this motif is mimicked by p6 late domain of HIV and related viruses which facilitates viral hijacking of ESCRT pathway and consequential budding of viral particles.
