= Chitobiosyldiphosphodolichol beta-mannosyltransferase =

Class of enzymes

chitobiosyldiphosphodolichol beta-mannosyltransferase

Identifiers
- EC no.: 2.4.1.142
- CAS no.: 83380-85-2

Databases
- BRENDA: enzyme data
- ExPASy: NiceZyme view
- KEGG: enzyme entry
- MetaCyc: metabolic pathway
- Rhea: reactions
- PDB structures: RCSB PDB PDBe PDBsum
- Gene Ontology: AmiGO / QuickGO
Search
- PMC: articles
- PubMed: articles
- NCBI: proteins

In enzymology, a chitobiosyldiphosphodolichol beta-mannosyltransferase (EC 2.4.1.142) is an enzyme that catalyzes the chemical reaction

GDP-mannose + chitobiosyldiphosphodolichol $\rightleftharpoons$ GDP + beta-1,4-D-mannosylchitobiosyldiphosphodolichol

Thus, the two substrates of this enzyme are GDP-mannose and chitobiosyldiphosphodolichol, whereas its two products are GDP and beta-1,4-D-mannosylchitobiosyldiphosphodolichol.

This enzyme belongs to the family of glycosyltransferases, specifically the hexosyltransferases. The systematic name of this enzyme class is GDP-mannose:chitobiosyldiphosphodolichol beta-D-mannosyltransferase. Other names in common use include guanosine diphosphomannose-dolichol diphosphochitobiose, mannosyltransferase, and GDP-mannose-dolichol diphosphochitobiose mannosyltransferase. This enzyme participates in n-glycan biosynthesis and glycan structures - biosynthesis 1.
