= Undecaprenyl-phosphate mannosyltransferase =

Class of enzymes

undecaprenyl-phosphate mannosyltransferase

Identifiers
- EC no.: 2.4.1.54
- CAS no.: 37277-62-6

Databases
- IntEnz: IntEnz view
- BRENDA: BRENDA entry
- ExPASy: NiceZyme view
- KEGG: KEGG entry
- MetaCyc: metabolic pathway
- PRIAM: profile
- PDB structures: RCSB PDB PDBe PDBsum
- Gene Ontology: AmiGO / QuickGO
Search
- PMC: articles
- PubMed: articles
- NCBI: proteins

In enzymology, an undecaprenyl-phosphate mannosyltransferase (EC 2.4.1.54) is an enzyme that catalyzes the chemical reaction

GDP-mannose + undecaprenyl phosphate $\rightleftharpoons$ GDP + D-mannosyl-1-phosphoundecaprenol

Thus, the two substrates of this enzyme are GDP-mannose and undecaprenyl phosphate, whereas its two products are GDP and D-mannosyl-1-phosphoundecaprenol.

This enzyme belongs to the family of glycosyltransferases, specifically the hexosyltransferases. The systematic name of this enzyme class is GDP-mannose:undecaprenyl-phosphate D-mannosyltransferase. Other names in common use include guanosine diphosphomannose-undecaprenyl phosphate, mannosyltransferase, GDP mannose-undecaprenyl phosphate mannosyltransferase, and GDP-D-mannose:lipid phosphate transmannosylase. It employs one cofactor, phosphatidylglycerol. Sources of this enzyme includes Micrococcus luteus, Phaseolus aureus, Mycobacterium smegmatis and cotton fibers.
