= GDP-L-galactose phosphorylase =

Class of enzymes

Identifiers
- EC no.: 2.7.7.69

Databases
- IntEnz: IntEnz view
- BRENDA: BRENDA entry
- ExPASy: NiceZyme view
- KEGG: KEGG entry
- MetaCyc: metabolic pathway
- PRIAM: profile
- PDB structures: RCSB PDB PDBe PDBsum
Search
- PMC: articles
- PubMed: articles
- NCBI: proteins

GDP-L-galactose phosphorylase (EC 2.7.7.69, VTC2, VTC5) is an enzyme with systematic name GDP:alpha-L-galactose 1-phosphate guanylyltransferase. It catalyses two related chemical reactions involving α-D-mannose 1-phosphate. In the first, this compound reacts with guanosine diphosphate galactose (GDP-β-L-galactose) to give guanosine diphosphate mannose and β-L-galactose 1-phosphate. This is an important enzyme in the Smirnoff-Wheeler pathway that allows plants to make ascorbic acid.

GDP-β-L-galactose
+
α-D-mannose 1-phosphate
guanosine diphosphate mannose
+
β-L-galactose 1-phosphate

The plant enzyme can also use α-D-mannose 1-phosphate and GDP-α-D-glucose to yield guanosine diphosphate mannose and glucose 1-phosphate:

GDP-α-D-glucose
+
α-D-mannose 1-phosphate
guanosine diphosphate mannose
+
glucose 1-phosphate

This reaction is also found in the nematode Caenorhabditis elegans and in mammals, using the same protein.
