= Annexin A5 =

Protein-coding gene in the species Homo sapiens

ANXA5
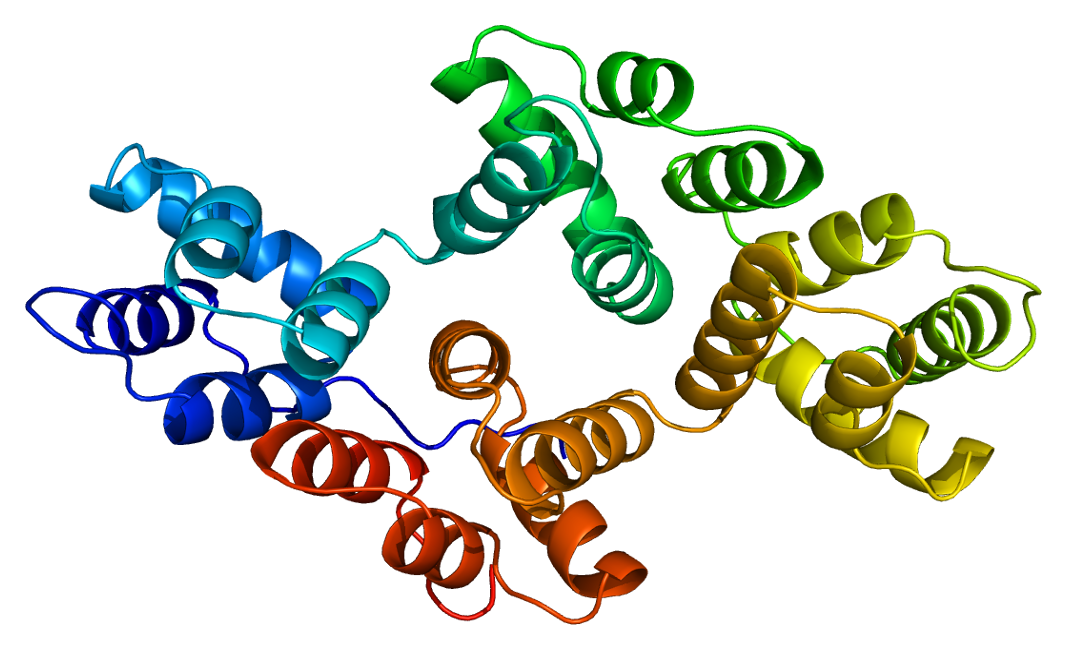

Identifiers
- Aliases: ANXA5, ANX5, ENX2, HEL-S-7, PP4, RPRGL3, annexin A5, CPB-I, VAC-alph
- External IDs: OMIM: 131230; MGI: 106008; GeneCards: ANXA5
Available structures
PDB	Ortholog search: PDBe RCSB
PDB	List of PDB id codes 2XO3, 1ANW, 1ANX, 1AVH, 1AVR, 1HAK, 1HVD, 1HVE, 1HVF, 1HVG, 1SAV, 2XO2

Gene location (Human)
Chr.	Chromosome 4 (human)
Band	4q27	Start	121,667,946 bp
Band	4q27	End	121,696,995 bp

Gene location (Mouse)
Chr.	Chromosome 3 (mouse)
Band	3 B|3 17.46 cM	Start	36,503,072 bp
Band	3 B|3 17.46 cM	End	36,530,043 bp
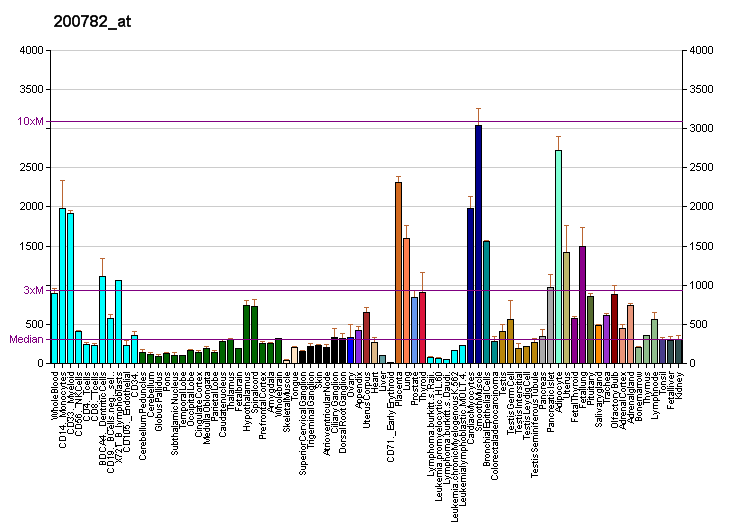
RNA expression pattern
Bgee	Human / Mouse (ortholog); Top expressed in: stromal cell of endometrium; smooth muscle tissue; Achilles tendon; right lung; canal of the cervix; gallbladder; monocyte; Descending thoracic aorta; ascending aorta; islet of Langerhans / Top expressed in: utricle; vestibular membrane of cochlear duct; stroma of bone marrow; right lung lobe; vestibular sensory epithelium; calvaria; molar; dermis; umbilical cord; white adipose tissue; More reference expression data
BioGPS	More reference expression data
Gene ontology
Molecular function	phospholipase inhibitor activity; calcium ion binding; protein binding; calcium-dependent phospholipid binding; phospholipid binding; P-type calcium transporter activity; heparin binding; peptide hormone binding; receptor tyrosine kinase binding; molecular adaptor activity
Cellular component	membrane; focal adhesion; intracellular anatomical structure; endothelial microparticle; extracellular exosome; external side of plasma membrane; extracellular region; cytoplasm; cytosol; collagen-containing extracellular matrix
Biological process	hemostasis; negative regulation of coagulation; blood coagulation; negative regulation of apoptotic process; response to organic substance; signal transduction; negative regulation of catalytic activity; platelet degranulation; negative regulation of blood coagulation; positive regulation of apoptotic process; protein homooligomerization; negative regulation of sequestering of calcium ion; response to calcium ion; calcium ion transmembrane transport; cellular response to lead ion; response to thyroid hormone; cellular response to gonadotropin-releasing hormone; regulation of flagellated sperm motility; negative regulation of prolactin secretion
Sources:Amigo / QuickGO
Orthologs
Databases	NCBI: entry; OMA: entry
Species	Human	Mouse
Entrez	308	11747
Ensembl	ENSG00000164111	ENSMUSG00000027712
UniProt	P08758	P48036
RefSeq (mRNA)	NM_001154	NM_009673
RefSeq (protein)	NP_001145	NP_033803
Location (UCSC)	Chr 4: 121.67 – 121.7 Mb	Chr 3: 36.5 – 36.53 Mb
PubMed search
- Wikidata
View/Edit Human	View/Edit Mouse

Annexin A5 (or annexin V) is a cellular protein in the annexin group. In flow cytometry, annexin V is commonly used to detect apoptotic cells by its ability to bind to phosphatidylserine, a marker of apoptosis when it is on the outer leaflet of the plasma membrane. The function of the protein is unknown; however, annexin A5 has been proposed to play a role in the inhibition of blood coagulation by competing for phosphatidylserine binding sites with prothrombin and also to inhibit the activity of phospholipase A1. These properties have been found by in vitro experiments.

== Pathology ==
Antibodies directed against annexin A5 are found in patients with a disease called the antiphospholipid syndrome (APS), a thrombophilic disease associated with autoantibodies against phospholipid compounds.

Annexin A5 forms a shield around negatively charged phospholipid molecules. The formation of an annexin A5 shield blocks the entry of phospholipids into coagulation (clotting) reactions. In the antiphospholipid antibody syndrome, the formation of the shield is disrupted by antibodies. Without the shield, there is an increased quantity of phospholipid molecules on cell membranes, speeding up coagulation reactions and causing the blood-clotting characteristic of the antiphospholipid antibody syndrome.
Annexin A5 showed upregulation in papillary thyroid carcinoma.

== Laboratory use ==
Annexin A5 is used as a non-quantitative probe to detect cells that have expressed phosphatidylserine (PS) on the cell surface, an event found in apoptosis as well as other forms of cell death. Platelets also expose PS and PE on their surface when activated, which serves as binding site for various coagulation factors.

The annexin A5 affinity assay typically uses a conjugate of annexin V and a fluorescent or enzymatic label, biotin or other tags, or a radioelement, in a suitable buffer (annexin V binding to aminophospholipids is Ca^{2+} dependent). The assay combines annexin V staining of PS and PE membrane events with the staining of DNA in the cell nucleus with propidium iodide (PI) or 7-Aminoactinomycin D (AAD-7), distinguishing viable cells from apoptotic cells and necrotic cells. Detection occurs by flow cytometry or a fluorescence microscope.

== Interactions ==
Annexin A5 has been shown to interact with Kinase insert domain receptor and Integrin, beta 5.
