= Annexin A5 affinity assay =

In molecular biology, an annexin A5 affinity assay is a test to quantify the number of cells undergoing apoptosis. The assay uses the protein annexin A5 to tag apoptotic and dead cells, and the numbers are then counted using either flow cytometry or a fluorescence microscope.

The annexin a5 protein binds to apoptotic cells in a calcium-dependent manner using phosphatidylserine-containing membrane surfaces that are usually present only on the inner leaflet of the membrane.

== Background ==
Apoptosis is a form of programmed cell death that is used by the body to remove unwanted, damaged, or senescent cells from tissues. Removal of apoptotic cells is carried out via phagocytosis by white blood cells such as macrophages and dendritic cells. Phagocytic white blood cells recognize apoptotic cells by their exposure of negatively charged phospholipids (phosphatidylserine) on the cell surface.

In normal cells, the negative phospholipids reside on the inner side of the cellular membrane while the outer surface of the membrane is occupied by uncharged phospholipids. After a cell has entered apoptosis, the negatively charged phospholipids are transported to the outer cell surface by a hypothetical protein known as scramblase. Phagocytic white blood cells express a receptor that can bind to and detect the negatively charged phospholipids on the apoptotic cell surfaces. After detection the apoptotic cells are removed.

== Detection of cell death with annexin A5 ==
Healthy individual apoptotic cells are rapidly removed by phagocytes. However, in pathological processes, the removal of apoptotic cells may be delayed or even absent. Dying cells in tissue can be detected with annexin A5. Labeling of annexin A5 with fluorescent or radioactive molecules makes it possible to detect binding of labeled annexin A5 to the cell surface of apoptotic cells. After binding to the phospholipid surface, annexin A5 assembles into a trimeric cluster. This trimer consists of three annexin A5 molecules that are bound to each other via non-covalent protein-protein interactions. The formation of annexin A5 trimers results in the formation of a two-dimensional crystal lattice on the phospholipid membrane. This clustering of annexin A5 on the membrane greatly increases the intensity of annexin A5 when labeled with a fluorescent or radioactive probe. Two-dimensional crystal formation is believed to cause internalization of annexin A5 through a novel process of endocytosis if it occurs on cells that are in the early phase of executing cell death. Internalization amplifies additionally the intensity of the annexin A5 stained cell.

Annexin A5 has been used to successively detect apoptotic cells in vitro and in vivo. Pathological processes in which apoptosis occurs include inflammation, ischemia damage of the heart caused by myocardial infarction, apoptotic white blood cells and smooth muscle cells present in atherosclerotic plaques of blood vessels, transplanted organs in the donor patient that are rejected by the immune system or tumour cells that are exposed to cytostatic drugs during chemotherapy.

The non-invasive detection of diseased tissue with, for example, radioactively labeled annexin A5 is the goal of a recently developed line of research known as Molecular Imaging.

Molecular Imaging of cell death using radioactive annexin A5 can become of clinical significance to diagnose vulnerability of atherosclerotic plaques (unstable atherosclerosis), heart failure, transplant rejection, and to monitor efficacy of anti-cancer therapy.
