= Annexin A1 =

Protein-coding gene in the species Homo sapiens

ANXA1
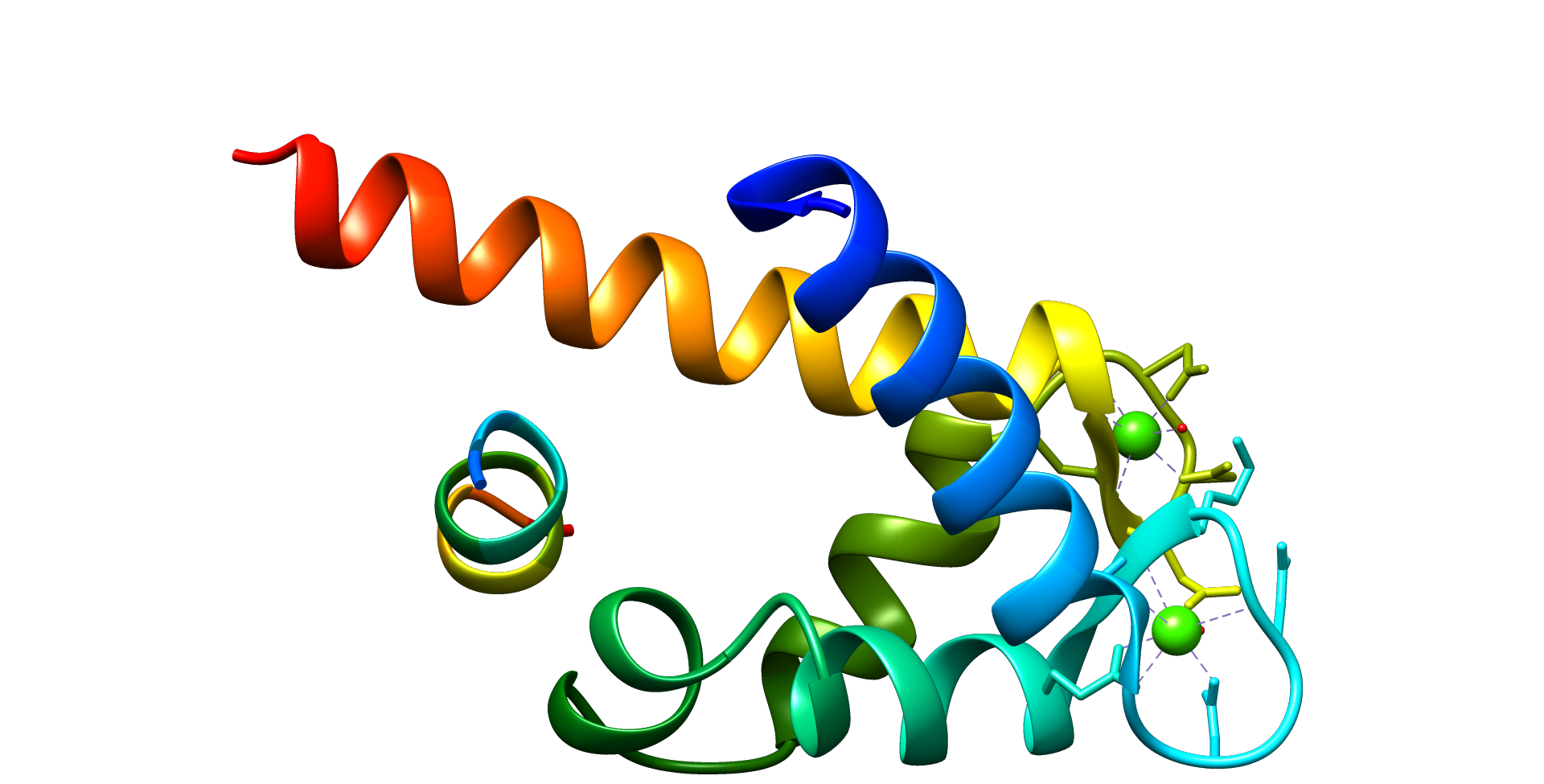

Identifiers
- Aliases: ANXA1, ANX1, LPC1, annexin A1
- External IDs: OMIM: 151690; MGI: 96819; GeneCards: ANXA1
Available structures
PDB	Ortholog search: PDBe RCSB
PDB	List of PDB id codes 1QLS, 1AIN, 1BO9

Gene location (Human)
Chr.	Chromosome 9 (human)
Band	9q21.13	Start	73,151,865 bp
Band	9q21.13	End	73,170,393 bp

Gene location (Mouse)
Chr.	Chromosome 19 (mouse)
Band	19 B|19 13.83 cM	Start	20,350,792 bp
Band	19 B|19 13.83 cM	End	20,368,308 bp
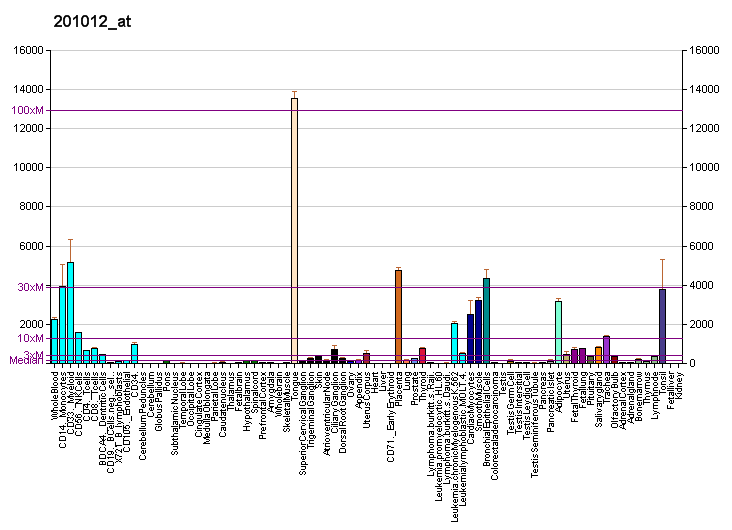
RNA expression pattern
Bgee	Human / Mouse (ortholog); Top expressed in: oral cavity; mucosa of pharynx; gums; gingival epithelium; body of tongue; amniotic fluid; Achilles tendon; palpebral conjunctiva; epithelium of nasopharynx; nasal epithelium / Top expressed in: stroma of bone marrow; granulocyte; umbilical cord; corneal stroma; epithelium of lens; endothelial cell of lymphatic vessel; skin of abdomen; tibiofemoral joint; skin of external ear; conjunctival fornix; More reference expression data
BioGPS	More reference expression data
Gene ontology
Molecular function	calcium ion binding; protein-macromolecule adaptor activity; structural molecule activity; calcium-dependent protein binding; double-stranded DNA helicase activity; signaling receptor binding; phospholipid binding; ATP-dependent DNA/DNA annealing activity; helicase activity; phospholipase A2 inhibitor activity; metal ion binding; protein homodimerization activity; single-stranded DNA binding; protein binding; calcium-dependent phospholipid binding; phospholipase inhibitor activity; single-stranded RNA binding; cadherin binding involved in cell-cell adhesion; DNA/DNA annealing activity
Cellular component	cytoplasm; endosome; membrane; focal adhesion; extracellular region; nucleus; cell projection; mitochondrial membranes; cilium; cornified envelope; cell surface; extrinsic component of external side of plasma membrane; apical plasma membrane; motile cilium; extracellular exosome; early endosome membrane; lateral plasma membrane; plasma membrane; extrinsic component of endosome membrane; nucleoplasm; early endosome; endosome membrane; extrinsic component of membrane; vesicle; mast cell granule; basolateral plasma membrane; sarcolemma; phagocytic cup; cytoplasmic vesicle membrane; cytoplasmic vesicle; extracellular space; cytosol; actin filament; protein-containing complex; collagen-containing extracellular matrix; synaptic membrane
Biological process	response to interleukin-1; adaptive immune response; estrous cycle; hepatocyte differentiation; prostate gland development; cell surface receptor signaling pathway; myoblast migration involved in skeletal muscle regeneration; granulocyte chemotaxis; endocrine pancreas development; gliogenesis; negative regulation of T-helper 2 cell differentiation; neutrophil homeostasis; prolactin secretion; positive regulation of wound healing; negative regulation of phospholipase A2 activity; insulin secretion; regulation of leukocyte migration; positive regulation of G1/S transition of mitotic cell cycle; cellular response to glucocorticoid stimulus; positive regulation of T cell proliferation; phagocytosis; innate immune response; inflammatory response; arachidonic acid secretion; negative regulation of exocytosis; monocyte chemotaxis; immune system process; positive regulation of T-helper 1 cell differentiation; regulation of interleukin-1 production; G protein-coupled receptor signaling pathway, coupled to cyclic nucleotide second messenger; negative regulation of apoptotic process; positive regulation of prostaglandin biosynthetic process; positive regulation of vesicle fusion; positive regulation of interleukin-2 production; regulation of inflammatory response; regulation of cell shape; alpha-beta T cell differentiation; response to hormone; actin cytoskeleton reorganization; response to estradiol; response to organic cyclic compound; response to peptide hormone; response to glucocorticoid; keratinocyte differentiation; positive regulation of neutrophil apoptotic process; DNA rewinding; response to corticosteroid; DNA duplex unwinding; peptide cross-linking; regulation of cell population proliferation; neutrophil clearance; positive regulation of apoptotic process; regulation of hormone secretion; negative regulation of protein secretion; response to X-ray; signal transduction; cellular response to hydrogen peroxide; cell-cell adhesion; G protein-coupled receptor signaling pathway; cytokine-mediated signaling pathway; cellular response to vascular endothelial growth factor stimulus; positive regulation of cell migration involved in sprouting angiogenesis; negative regulation of catalytic activity
Sources:Amigo / QuickGO
Orthologs
Databases	NCBI: entry; OMA: entry
Species	Human	Mouse
Entrez	301	16952
Ensembl	ENSG00000135046	ENSMUSG00000024659
UniProt	P04083; Q5T3N0	P10107
RefSeq (mRNA)	NM_000700	NM_010730
RefSeq (protein)	NP_000691	NP_034860
Location (UCSC)	Chr 9: 73.15 – 73.17 Mb	Chr 19: 20.35 – 20.37 Mb
PubMed search
- Wikidata
View/Edit Human	View/Edit Mouse

Annexin A1, also known as lipocortin I, is a protein that is encoded by the ANXA1 gene in humans.

== Function ==
Annexin A1 belongs to the annexin family of Ca^{2+}-dependent phospholipid-binding proteins that have a molecular weight of approximately 35,000 to 40,000 Dalton and are preferentially located on the cytosolic face of the plasma membrane. Annexin A1 protein has an apparent relative molecular mass of 40 kDa with phospholipase A2 inhibitory activity.

== Clinical significance ==
=== Glucocorticoids and anti-inflammatory action ===
Glucocorticoids (such as budesonide, cortisol, and beclomethasone) are widely used to suppress inflammation. The main mechanism of glucocorticoids' anti-inflammatory action is increased synthesis and activity of annexin A1. Annexin A1 both suppresses phospholipase A2, thereby blocking eicosanoid production, and inhibits various leukocyte inflammatory events (epithelial adhesion, emigration, chemotaxis, phagocytosis, respiratory burst, etc.). Annexins inhibit prostaglandin synthesis at the level of phospholipase A2 as well as at the level of cyclooxygenase/PGE isomerase (COX-1 and COX-2), the latter effect being much like that of NSAIDs, potentiating the anti-inflammatory effect.

=== Innate and adaptive immunity ===
In resting conditions, human and mouse immune cells such as neutrophils, monocytes, and macrophages contain high levels of annexin A1 in their cytoplasm. Following cell activation (for example, by neutrophil adhesion to endothelial-cell monolayers), annexin A1 is promptly mobilized to the cell surface and secreted. Annexin A1 promotes neutrophil detachment and apoptosis, and phagocytosis of apoptotic neutrophils by macrophages. On the other hand, it reduces the tendency of neutrophils to penetrate the endothelium of blood vessels. In vitro and in vivo analyses show that exogenous and endogenous annexin A1 counter-regulate the activities of innate immune cells, particularly extravasation and the generation of proinflammatory mediators, which ensures that a sufficient level of activation is reached but not exceeded.

Annexin A1 has important opposing properties during innate and adaptive immune responses: it inhibits innate immune cells and promotes T-cell activation. The activation of T cells results in the release of annexin A1 and the expression of its receptor. This pathway seems to fine-tune the strength of TCR signalling. Higher expression of annexin A1 during pathological conditions could increase the strength of TCR signalling through the mitogen-activated protein kinase signalling pathway, thereby causing a state of hyperactivation of T cells.

=== Inflammation ===
Since phospholipase A2 is required for the biosynthesis of the potent mediators of inflammation, prostaglandins, and leukotrienes, annexin A1 may have potential anti-inflammatory activity.

Glucocorticoids stimulate production of lipocortin. In this way, synthesis of eicosanoids are inhibited.

=== Cancer ===
Annexin A1 has been of interest for use as a potential anticancer drug. Upon induction by modified NSAIDS and other potent anti-inflammatory drugs, annexin A1 inhibits the NF-κB signal transduction pathway, which is exploited by cancerous cells to proliferate and avoid apoptosis. ANXA1 inhibits the activation of NF-κB by binding to the p65 subunit.

==== Glioblastoma ====
In glioblastoma, ANXA1 is selectively enriched in perivascularly invading tumor cells and functionally promotes vessel-associated invasion. In patient-derived xenografts, CRISPR knockout of ANXA1 reduced tumor–vessel association, shifted tumors toward a more diffuse invasion pattern, and prolonged survival; across patient cohorts, a higher fraction of ANXA1-positive cells was modestly associated with shorter survival. Separately, glioma-derived ANXA1 can drive an immunosuppressive tumor microenvironment via FPR1, inducing M2-like macrophages/microglia and Treg recruitment; in a clinical study of intratumoral TLR3 agonist (poly(I:C)) therapy, elevated tumor ANXA1 predicted non-response (predictive accuracy ~92%).

==== Leukemia ====
The gene for annexin A1 (ANXA1) is upregulated in hairy cell leukemia. ANXA1 protein expression is specific to hairy cell leukemia. Detection of ANXA1 (by immunocytochemical means) reportedly provides a simple, highly sensitive, and specific assay for the diagnosis of hairy cell leukemia.

==== Breast cancer ====
Altered annexin A1 expression levels through modulation of the immune system effects the initiation and spread of breast cancer, but the association is complex and conclusions of published studies often conflict.

Exposure of MCF-7 breast cancer cells to high physiological levels (up to 100 nM) of estrogen lead to an up-regulation of annexin A1 expression partially through the activation of CREB, and dependent on activation of the estrogen receptor alpha. Treatment of MCF-7 cells with physiological levels of estrogen (1 nM) induced proliferation while high pregnancy levels of estrogen (100 nM) induced a growth arrest of MCF-7 cells. Silencing of ANXA1 with specific siRNA reverses the estrogen-dependent proliferation as well as growth arrest. ANXA1 is lost in clinical breast cancer, indicating that the anti-proliferative protective function of ANXA1 against high levels of estrogen may be lost in breast cancer. This data suggests that ANXA1 may act as a tumor suppressor gene and modulate the proliferative functions of estrogens.

Annexin A1 protects against DNA damage induced by heat in breast cancer cells, adding to the evidence that it has tumor suppressive and protective activities. When ANXA1 is silenced or lost in cancer, cells are more prone to DNA damage, indicating its unidentified diverse role in genome maintenance or integrity. Annexin A1 has also been shown to be associated with treatment resistance. ARID1A loss activates annexin A1 expression, which is required for drug resistance (mTOR inhibitor or trastuzumab) through its activation of AKT.
