= ANXA8L1 =

Protein

Identifiers
- Aliases: ANXA8L1, ANXA8L2, VAC-beta, bA145E20.2, annexin A8-like 1, annexin A8 like 1
- External IDs: MGI: 1201374; GeneCards: ANXA8L1
Available structures
PDB	Ortholog search: PDBe RCSB
PDB	List of PDB id codes 1W3W

Gene location (Human)
Chr.	Chromosome 10 (human)
Band	10q11.22	Start	46,375,627 bp
Band	10q11.22	End	46,391,784 bp

Gene location (Mouse)
Chr.	Chromosome 14 (mouse)
Band	14 B|14 20.8 cM	Start	33,807,938 bp
Band	14 B|14 20.8 cM	End	33,822,528 bp
RNA expression pattern
Bgee	Human / Mouse (ortholog); Top expressed in: skin of abdomen; skin of leg; mucosa of esophagus; placenta; right lung; vagina; olfactory zone of nasal mucosa; upper lobe of left lung; minor salivary glands; testicle / Top expressed in: skin of external ear; corneal stroma; lip; conjunctival fornix; ankle; ankle joint; skin of back; skin of abdomen; decidua; esophagus; More reference expression data
BioGPS	n/a
Gene ontology
Molecular function	calcium-dependent phospholipid binding; metal ion binding; calcium ion binding; phosphatidylinositol-4,5-bisphosphate binding; phosphatidylinositol-3,4,5-trisphosphate binding; phosphatidylinositol-3,4-bisphosphate binding; actin filament binding
Cellular component	extracellular exosome; intracellular anatomical structure
Biological process	endosome organization; endosomal transport; negative regulation of serine-type endopeptidase activity; negative regulation of phospholipase A2 activity
Sources:Amigo / QuickGO
Orthologs
Databases	NCBI: entry; OMA: entry
Species	Human	Mouse
Entrez	728113	11752
Ensembl	ENSG00000264230	ENSMUSG00000021950
UniProt	Q5VT79	O35640
RefSeq (mRNA)	NM_001039801; NM_001098845; NM_001278923; NM_001278924; NM_001630	NM_001281845; NM_013473
RefSeq (protein)	NP_001092315; NP_001265852; NP_001265853	NP_001268774; NP_038501
Location (UCSC)	Chr 10: 46.38 – 46.39 Mb	Chr 14: 33.81 – 33.82 Mb
PubMed search
- Wikidata
View/Edit Human	View/Edit Mouse

Annexin A8-like protein 1 is a protein that in humans is encoded by the ANXA8L1 gene (previously ANXA8L2).

This gene encodes a member of the annexin family of evolutionarily conserved Ca2+ and phospholipid binding proteins. The encoded protein may function as an anticoagulant that indirectly inhibits the thromboplastin-specific complex. Overexpression of this gene has been associated with acute myelocytic leukemia. A highly similar duplicated copy of this gene is found in close proximity on the long arm of chromosome 10.
