= Annexin A4 =

Protein found in humans

ANXA4
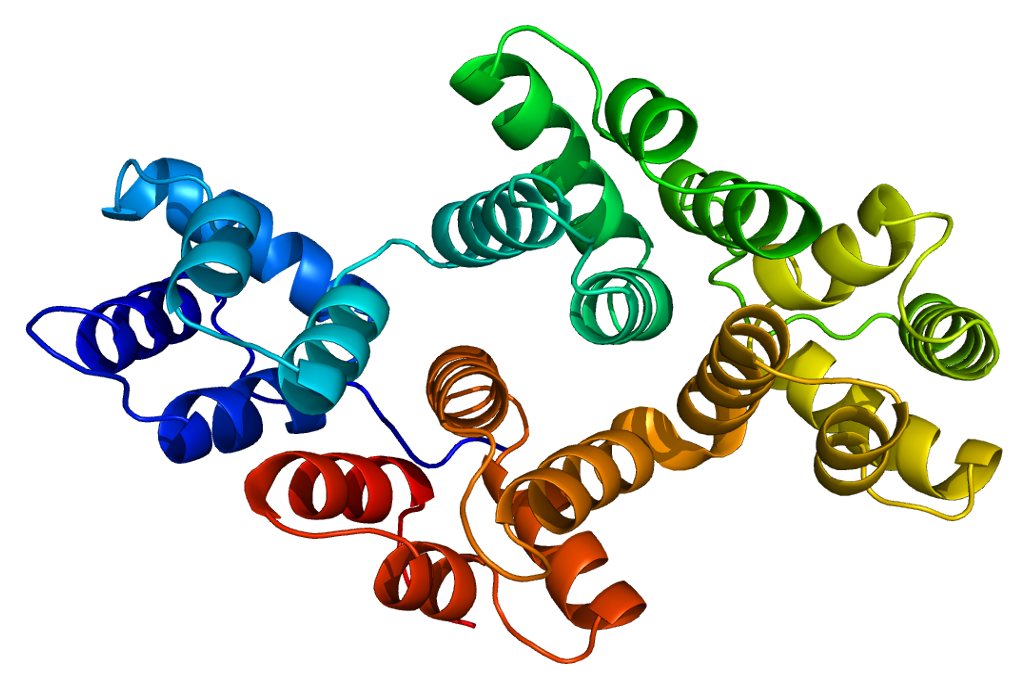

Identifiers
- Aliases: ANXA4, ANX4, HEL-S-274, PIG28, ZAP36, P32.5, PAP-II, PP4-X, annexin A4
- External IDs: OMIM: 106491; MGI: 88030; GeneCards: ANXA4
Available structures
PDB	Ortholog search: PDBe RCSB
PDB	List of PDB id codes 2ZOC

Gene location (Human)
Chr.	Chromosome 2 (human)
Band	2p13.3	Start	69,644,425 bp
Band	2p13.3	End	69,827,112 bp

Gene location (Mouse)
Chr.	Chromosome 6 (mouse)
Band	6 D1|6 37.75 cM	Start	86,713,822 bp
Band	6 D1|6 37.75 cM	End	86,770,566 bp
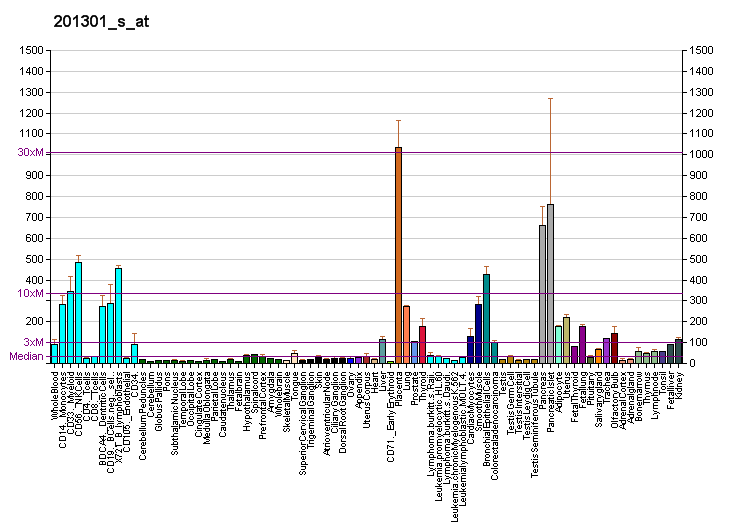

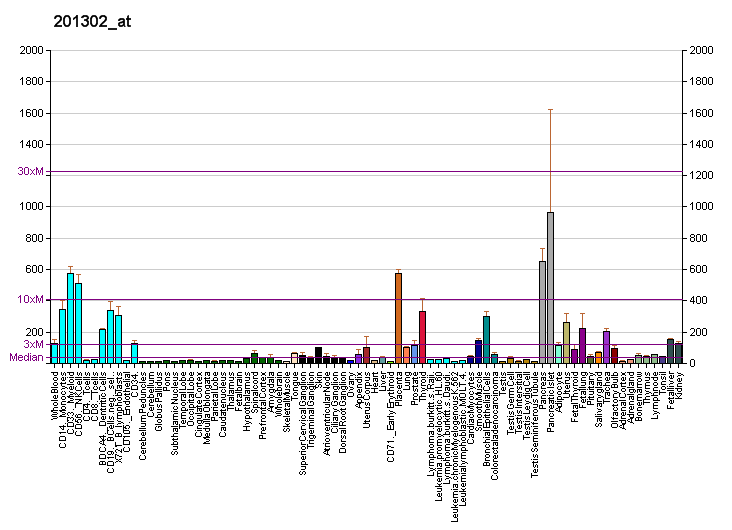
RNA expression pattern
Bgee	Human / Mouse (ortholog); Top expressed in: pancreatic ductal cell; gallbladder; jejunal mucosa; duodenum; body of pancreas; mucosa of ileum; islet of Langerhans; bronchial epithelial cell; mucosa of colon; mucosa of sigmoid colon / Top expressed in: Paneth cell; jejunum; crypt of lieberkuhn of small intestine; gastric mucosa; epithelium of stomach; ileum; pyloric antrum; mucous cell of stomach; migratory enteric neural crest cell; epithelium of small intestine; More reference expression data
BioGPS	More reference expression data
Gene ontology
Molecular function	phospholipase inhibitor activity; calcium ion binding; calcium-dependent protein binding; NF-kappaB binding; protein binding; identical protein binding; calcium-dependent phospholipid binding; heparin binding; chondroitin sulfate binding
Cellular component	cytoplasm; nuclear membrane; vesicle membrane; plasma membrane; cell surface; perinuclear region of cytoplasm; extracellular exosome; nucleus; cytosol; collagen-containing extracellular matrix
Biological process	Notch signaling pathway; epithelial cell differentiation; regulation of transcription by RNA polymerase II; negative regulation of apoptotic process; negative regulation of NF-kappaB transcription factor activity; signal transduction; negative regulation of catalytic activity
Sources:Amigo / QuickGO
Orthologs
Databases	NCBI: entry; OMA: entry
Species	Human	Mouse
Entrez	307	11746
Ensembl	ENSG00000196975	ENSMUSG00000029994
UniProt	P09525	P97429
RefSeq (mRNA)	NM_001153; NM_001320698; NM_001320700; NM_001320702; NM_001365496	NM_013471; NM_001331120
RefSeq (protein)	NP_001144; NP_001307627; NP_001307629; NP_001307631; NP_001352425	NP_001318049; NP_038499
Location (UCSC)	Chr 2: 69.64 – 69.83 Mb	Chr 6: 86.71 – 86.77 Mb
PubMed search
- Wikidata
View/Edit Human	View/Edit Mouse

Annexin A4 is a protein that in humans is encoded by the ANXA4 gene.

== Function ==
Annexin IV (ANX4) belongs to the annexin family of calcium-dependent phospholipid binding proteins. Although their functions are still not clearly defined, several members of the annexin family have been implicated in membrane-related events along exocytotic and endocytotic pathways. ANX4 has 45 to 59% identity with other members of its family and shares a similar size and exon-intron organization. Isolated from human placenta, ANX4 encodes a protein that has possible interactions with ATP, and has in vitro anticoagulant activity and also inhibits phospholipase A2 activity. ANX4 is almost exclusively expressed in epithelial cells.
