= GDP-mannose:cellobiosyl-diphosphopolyprenol alpha-mannosyltransferase =

Class of enzymes

Identifiers
- EC no.: 2.4.1.252

Databases
- IntEnz: IntEnz view
- BRENDA: BRENDA entry
- ExPASy: NiceZyme view
- KEGG: KEGG entry
- MetaCyc: metabolic pathway
- PRIAM: profile
- PDB structures: RCSB PDB PDBe PDBsum
Search
- PMC: articles
- PubMed: articles
- NCBI: proteins

GDP-mannose:cellobiosyl-diphosphopolyprenol alpha-mannosyltransferase (EC 2.4.1.252, GumH, AceA, alpha1,3-mannosyltransferase AceA) is an enzyme with systematic name GDP-mannose:D-Glc-beta-(1->4)-Glc-alpha-1-diphospho-ditrans,octacis-undecaprenol 3-alpha-mannosyltransferase . This enzyme catalyses the following chemical reaction

GDP-mannose + D-Glc-beta-(1->4)-Glc-alpha-1-diphospho-ditrans,octacis-undecaprenol $\rightleftharpoons$ GDP + D-Man-alpha-(1->3)-D-Glc-beta-(1->4)-D-Glc-alpha-1-diphospho-ditrans,octacis-undecaprenol

In the bacterium Gluconacetobacter xylinus the enzyme is involved in the biosynthesis of the exopolysaccharide acetan.
