= Heteroglycan alpha-mannosyltransferase =

Class of enzymes

heteroglycan alpha-mannosyltransferase

Identifiers
- EC no.: 2.4.1.48
- CAS no.: 37277-57-9

Databases
- IntEnz: IntEnz view
- BRENDA: BRENDA entry
- ExPASy: NiceZyme view
- KEGG: KEGG entry
- MetaCyc: metabolic pathway
- PRIAM: profile
- PDB structures: RCSB PDB PDBe PDBsum
- Gene Ontology: AmiGO / QuickGO
Search
- PMC: articles
- PubMed: articles
- NCBI: proteins

In enzymology, a heteroglycan alpha-mannosyltransferase (EC 2.4.1.48) is an enzyme that catalyzes the chemical reaction

GDP-mannose + heteroglycan $\rightleftharpoons$ GDP + 2(or 3)-alpha-D-mannosyl-heteroglycan

Thus, the two substrates of this enzyme are GDP-mannose and heteroglycan, whereas its 3 products are GDP, 2-alpha-D-mannosyl-heteroglycan, and 3-alpha-D-mannosyl-heteroglycan.

This enzyme belongs to the family of glycosyltransferases, to be specific the hexosyltransferases. The systematic name of this enzyme class is GDP-mannose:heteroglycan 2-(or 3-)-alpha-D-mannosyltransferase. Other names in common use include GDP mannose alpha-mannosyltransferase, and guanosine diphosphomannose-heteroglycan alpha-mannosyltransferase.
