= Annexin A13 =

Protein-coding gene in the species Homo sapiens

ANXA13

Identifiers
- Aliases: ANXA13, ANX13, ISA, annexin A13
- External IDs: OMIM: 602573; MGI: 1917037; GeneCards: ANXA13

Gene location (Human)
Chr.	Chromosome 8 (human)
Band	8q24.13	Start	123,680,794 bp
Band	8q24.13	End	123,737,402 bp

Gene location (Mouse)
Chr.	Chromosome 15 (mouse)
Band	15 D1|15 24.66 cM	Start	58,204,867 bp
Band	15 D1|15 24.66 cM	End	58,261,093 bp
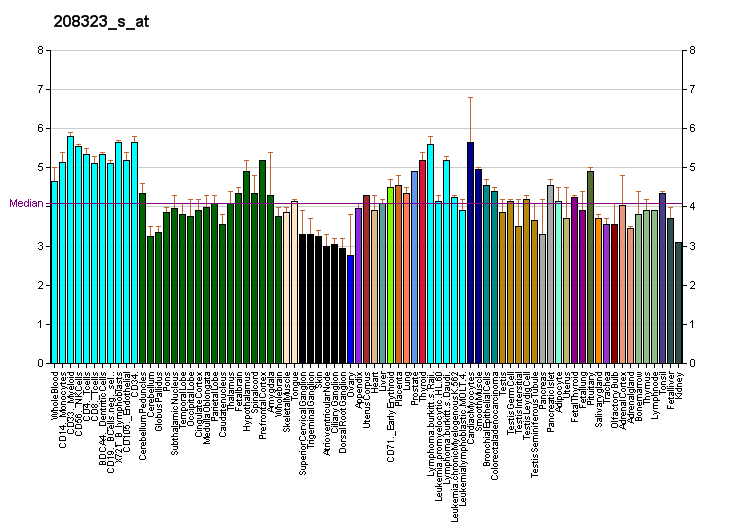
RNA expression pattern
Bgee	Human / Mouse (ortholog); Top expressed in: gallbladder; jejunal mucosa; duodenum; right uterine tube; rectum; pancreatic ductal cell; mucosa of transverse colon; mucosa of sigmoid colon; C1 segment; mucosa of ileum / Top expressed in: duodenum; jejunum; ileum; pancreas; colon; islet of Langerhans; stomach; connecting tubule; midgut; proximal tubule; More reference expression data
BioGPS	More reference expression data
Gene ontology
Molecular function	calcium-dependent phospholipid binding; calcium ion binding; phosphatidylserine binding; phosphatidylcholine binding; phosphatidylglycerol binding
Cellular component	membrane raft; plasma membrane; basolateral plasma membrane; extracellular exosome; apical plasma membrane; exocytic vesicle; membrane; nucleoplasm; extracellular space
Biological process	positive regulation of Golgi to plasma membrane protein transport; cell differentiation; negative regulation of Golgi to plasma membrane protein transport
Sources:Amigo / QuickGO
Orthologs
Databases	NCBI: entry; OMA: entry
Species	Human	Mouse
Entrez	312	69787
Ensembl	ENSG00000104537	ENSMUSG00000055114
UniProt	P27216	Q99JG3
RefSeq (mRNA)	NM_004306; NM_001003954	NM_027211
RefSeq (protein)	NP_001003954; NP_004297	NP_081487
Location (UCSC)	Chr 8: 123.68 – 123.74 Mb	Chr 15: 58.2 – 58.26 Mb
PubMed search
- Wikidata
View/Edit Human	View/Edit Mouse

Annexin A13 is a protein that in humans is encoded by the ANXA13 gene.

== Function ==
This gene encodes a member of the annexin family. Members of this calcium-dependent phospholipid-binding protein family play a role in the regulation of cellular growth and in signal transduction pathways. The specific function of this gene has not yet been determined; however, it is associated with the plasma membranes of undifferentiated, proliferating endothelial cells and differentiated villus enterocytes. Alternatively spliced transcript variants encoding different isoforms have been identified.
