= TRNA-queuosine beta-mannosyltransferase =

Class of enzymes

tRNA-queuosine beta-mannosyltransferase

Identifiers
- EC no.: 2.4.1.110
- CAS no.: 9055-06-5

Databases
- IntEnz: IntEnz view
- BRENDA: BRENDA entry
- ExPASy: NiceZyme view
- KEGG: KEGG entry
- MetaCyc: metabolic pathway
- PRIAM: profile
- PDB structures: RCSB PDB PDBe PDBsum
- Gene Ontology: AmiGO / QuickGO
Search
- PMC: articles
- PubMed: articles
- NCBI: proteins

In enzymology, a tRNA-queuosine beta-mannosyltransferase (EC 2.4.1.110) is an enzyme that catalyzes the chemical reaction

GDP-mannose + tRNAAsp-queuosine $\rightleftharpoons$ GDP + tRNAAsp-O-5"-beta-D-mannosylqueuosine

Thus, the two substrates of this enzyme are GDP-mannose and tRNAAsp-queuosine, whereas its two products are GDP and tRNAAsp-O-5''-beta-D-mannosylqueuosine.

This enzyme belongs to the family of glycosyltransferases, specifically the hexosyltransferases. The systematic name of this enzyme class is GDP-mannose:tRNAAsp-queuosine O-5"-beta-D-mannosyltransferase.
