= Glycolipid 3-alpha-mannosyltransferase =

Class of enzymes

glycolipid 3-alpha-mannosyltransferase

Identifiers
- EC no.: 2.4.1.132
- CAS no.: 81181-76-2

Databases
- IntEnz: IntEnz view
- BRENDA: BRENDA entry
- ExPASy: NiceZyme view
- KEGG: KEGG entry
- MetaCyc: metabolic pathway
- PRIAM: profile
- PDB structures: RCSB PDB PDBe PDBsum
- Gene Ontology: AmiGO / QuickGO
Search
- PMC: articles
- PubMed: articles
- NCBI: proteins

In enzymology, a glycolipid 3-alpha-mannosyltransferase (EC 2.4.1.132) is an enzyme that catalyzes the chemical reaction in which an alpha-D-mannosyl residue is transferred from GDP-mannose to a lipid-linked oligosaccharide, being attached by an alpha-1,3-D-mannosyl-D-mannose bond.

This enzyme belongs to the family of glycosyltransferases, specifically the hexosyltransferases. The systematic name of this enzyme class is GDP-mannose:glycolipid 1,3-alpha-D-mannosyltransferase. Other names in common use include mannosyltransferase II, guanosine diphosphomannose-oligosaccharide-lipid II, mannosyltransferase, and GDP-mannose-oligosaccharide-lipid mannosyltransferase II. This enzyme participates in the biosynthesis of n-glycan and glycan structures.
