= Sorcin =

Protein-coding gene in the species Homo sapiens

SRI
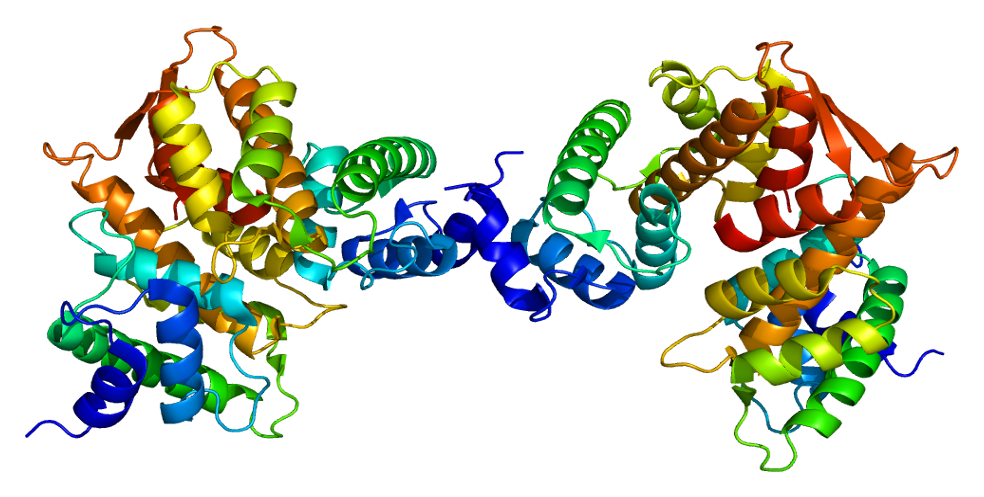

Identifiers
- Aliases: SRI, CP-22, CP22, SCN, V19, sorcin
- External IDs: OMIM: 182520; MGI: 98419; GeneCards: SRI
Available structures
PDB	Ortholog search: PDBe RCSB
PDB	List of PDB id codes 1JUO, 2JC2, 4U8D, 4UPG, 4USL

Gene location (Human)
Chr.	Chromosome 7 (human)
Band	7q21.12	Start	88,205,115 bp
Band	7q21.12	End	88,226,993 bp

Gene location (Mouse)
Chr.	Chromosome 5 (mouse)
Band	5 A1|5 3.38 cM	Start	8,096,078 bp
Band	5 A1|5 3.38 cM	End	8,119,379 bp
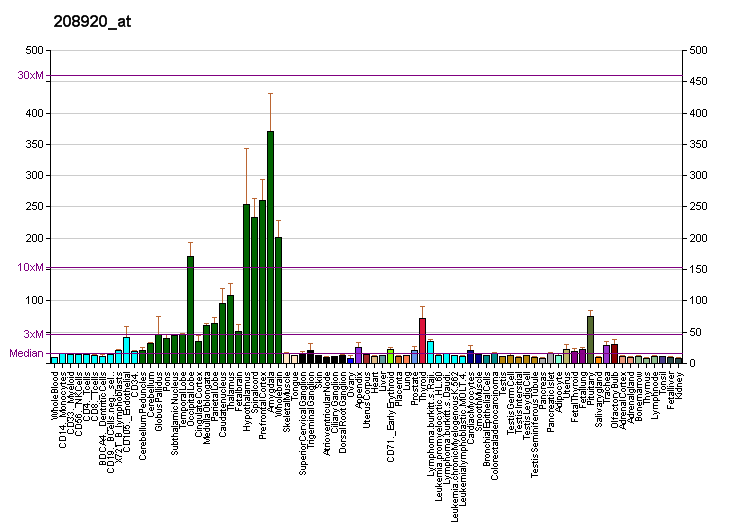

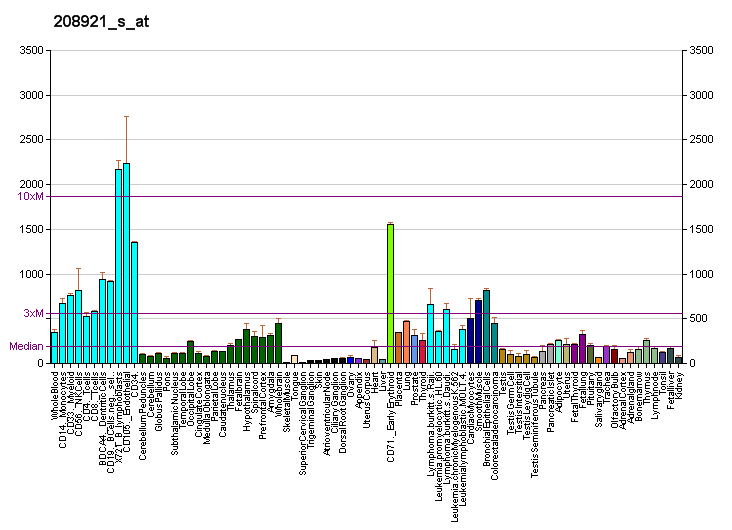
RNA expression pattern
Bgee	Human / Mouse (ortholog); Top expressed in: mucosa of transverse colon; mucosa of sigmoid colon; rectum; bronchial epithelial cell; mucosa of ileum; ventricular zone; oocyte; secondary oocyte; right uterine tube; nucleus accumbens / Top expressed in: granulocyte; left colon; mucous cell of stomach; duodenum; pyloric antrum; Paneth cell; endocardial cushion; epithelium of stomach; decidua; right kidney; More reference expression data
BioGPS	More reference expression data
Gene ontology
Molecular function	calcium ion binding; transmembrane transporter binding; calcium channel regulator activity; metal ion binding; calcium-dependent cysteine-type endopeptidase activity; protease binding; protein binding; protein heterodimerization activity; identical protein binding; signaling receptor binding
Cellular component	axon terminus; dendritic spine neck; vesicle; cytosol; endoplasmic reticulum membrane; membrane; T-tubule; plasma membrane; intracellular anatomical structure; sarcoplasmic reticulum; nucleoplasm; smooth endoplasmic reticulum; axon; chromaffin granule membrane; Z discdkac; mitochondrion; sarcoplasmic reticulum membrane; extracellular exosome; cytoplasm
Biological process	regulation of calcium ion transport; regulation of heart contraction; cytoplasmic sequestering of transcription factor; muscle organ development; positive regulation of release of sequestered calcium ion into cytosol; negative regulation of heart rate; proteolysis; negative regulation of ryanodine-sensitive calcium-release channel activity; regulation of cardiac muscle cell contraction; development of the heart; intracellular sequestering of iron ion; regulation of striated muscle contraction; negative regulation of transcription regulatory region DNA binding; regulation of high voltage-gated calcium channel activity; action potential; positive regulation of insulin secretion involved in cellular response to glucose stimulus; regulation of cell communication by electrical coupling; regulation of cell communication by electrical coupling involved in cardiac conduction; regulation of relaxation of muscle; regulation of release of sequestered calcium ion into cytosol by sarcoplasmic reticulum; calcium ion transport; signal transduction; negative regulation of cardiac muscle contraction; transport
Sources:Amigo / QuickGO
Orthologs
Databases	NCBI: entry; OMA: entry
Species	Human	Mouse
Entrez	6717	109552
Ensembl	ENSG00000075142	ENSMUSG00000003161
UniProt	P30626	Q6P069
RefSeq (mRNA)	NM_001256891; NM_001256892; NM_003130; NM_198901	NM_001080974; NM_025618
RefSeq (protein)	NP_001243820; NP_001243821; NP_003121; NP_944490	NP_001074443; NP_079894
Location (UCSC)	Chr 7: 88.21 – 88.23 Mb	Chr 5: 8.1 – 8.12 Mb
PubMed search
- Wikidata
View/Edit Human	View/Edit Mouse

Sorcin is a protein that in humans is encoded by the SRI gene.

== Interactions ==
Sorcin has been shown to interact with Ryanodine receptor 2, ANXA7 and GCA.
