= GDP-Man:Man2GlcNAc2-PP-dolichol alpha-1,6-mannosyltransferase =

Class of enzymes

Identifiers
- EC no.: 2.4.1.257

Databases
- IntEnz: IntEnz view
- BRENDA: BRENDA entry
- ExPASy: NiceZyme view
- KEGG: KEGG entry
- MetaCyc: metabolic pathway
- PRIAM: profile
- PDB structures: RCSB PDB PDBe PDBsum
Search
- PMC: articles
- PubMed: articles
- NCBI: proteins

GDP-Man:Man2GlcNAc2-PP-dolichol alpha-1,6-mannosyltransferase (EC 2.4.1.257, GDP-Man:Man2GlcNAc2-PP-Dol alpha-1,6-mannosyltransferase, Alg2 mannosyltransferase, ALG2 (gene), GDP-Man:Man1GlcNAc2-PP-dolichol mannosyltransferase) is an enzyme with systematic name GDP-D-mannose:D-Man-alpha-(1->3)-D-Man-beta-(1->4)-D-GlcNAc-beta-(1->4)-D-GlcNAc-diphosphodolichol alpha-6-mannosyltransferase. This enzyme catalyses the following chemical reaction

GDP-D-mannose + D-Man-alpha-(1->3)-D-Man-beta-(1->4)-D-GlcNAc-beta-(1->4)-D-GlcNAc-diphosphodolichol $\rightleftharpoons$ GDP + D-Man-alpha-(1->3)-[D-Man-alpha-(1->6)]-D-Man-beta-(1->4)-D-GlcNAc-beta-(1->4)-D-GlcNAc-diphosphodolichol

The biosynthesis of asparagine-linked glycoproteins utilizes a dolichyl diphosphate-linked glycosyl donor.

== Human proteins containing this domain ==
- ALG2
