= Initiation-specific alpha-1,6-mannosyltransferase =

Class of enzymes

Identifiers
- EC no.: 2.4.1.232
- CAS no.: 346003-17-6

Databases
- IntEnz: IntEnz view
- BRENDA: BRENDA entry
- ExPASy: NiceZyme view
- KEGG: KEGG entry
- MetaCyc: metabolic pathway
- PRIAM: profile
- PDB structures: RCSB PDB PDBe PDBsum
Search
- PMC: articles
- PubMed: articles
- NCBI: proteins

In enzymology, an initiation-specific alpha-1,6-mannosyltransferase (EC 2.4.1.232) is an enzyme that catalyzes the chemical reaction in which an alpha-D-mannosyl residue is transferred from GDP-mannose to a lipid-linked oligosaccharide, being linked by an alpha-1,6-D-mannosyl-D-mannose bond.

This enzyme belongs to the family of glycosyltransferases, specifically the hexosyltransferases. The systematic name of this enzyme class is GDP-mannose:oligosaccharide 1,6-alpha-D-mannosyltransferase. Other names in common use include alpha-1,6-mannosyltransferase, GDP-mannose:oligosaccharide 1,6-alpha-D-mannosyltransferase, GDP-mannose:glycolipid 1,6-alpha-D-mannosyltransferase, and glycolipid 6-alpha-mannosyltransferase. This enzyme participates in high-mannose type n-glycan biosynthesis.
