= Annexin A11 =

Protein-coding gene in the species Homo sapiens

ANXA11

Identifiers
- Aliases: ANXA11, ANX11, CAP50, annexin A11, CAP-50, ALS23, IBMWMA
- External IDs: OMIM: 602572; MGI: 108481; GeneCards: ANXA11

Gene location (Human)
Chr.	Chromosome 10 (human)
Band	10q22.3	Start	80,150,889 bp
Band	10q22.3	End	80,205,572 bp

Gene location (Mouse)
Chr.	Chromosome 14 (mouse)
Band	14 A3|14 15.06 cM	Start	25,842,580 bp
Band	14 A3|14 15.06 cM	End	25,887,228 bp
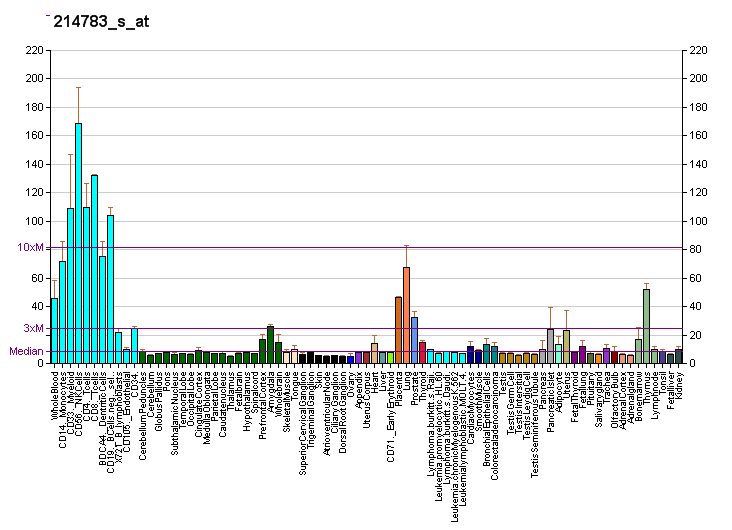

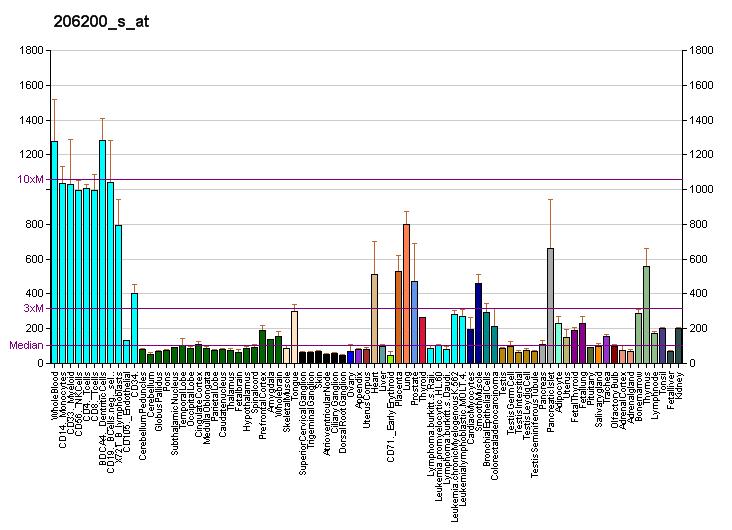
RNA expression pattern
Bgee	Human / Mouse (ortholog); Top expressed in: palpebral conjunctiva; mucosa of transverse colon; apex of heart; olfactory zone of nasal mucosa; muscle of thigh; epithelium of colon; right auricle of heart; granulocyte; left ventricle; blood / Top expressed in: granulocyte; muscle of thigh; placenta; quadriceps femoris muscle; colon; muscle tissue; skeletal muscle tissue; ileum; jejunum; urinary bladder; More reference expression data
BioGPS	More reference expression data
Gene ontology
Molecular function	calcium ion binding; S100 protein binding; calcium-dependent protein binding; phosphatidylethanolamine binding; protein binding; MHC class II protein complex binding; calcium-dependent phospholipid binding; RNA binding
Cellular component	cytoplasm; nuclear envelope; membrane; melanosome; spindle; nucleoplasm; midbody; azurophil granule; specific granule; phagocytic vesicle; extracellular exosome; cytoskeleton; nucleus; cytosol; collagen-containing extracellular matrix
Biological process	cell division; response to calcium ion; phagocytosis; cell cycle; cytokinetic process
Sources:Amigo / QuickGO
Orthologs
Databases	NCBI: entry; OMA: entry
Species	Human	Mouse
Entrez	311	11744
Ensembl	ENSG00000122359	ENSMUSG00000021866
UniProt	P50995	P97384
RefSeq (mRNA)	NM_001157; NM_001278407; NM_001278408; NM_001278409; NM_145868 NM_145869	NM_013469
RefSeq (protein)	NP_001148; NP_001265336; NP_001265337; NP_001265338; NP_665875 NP_665876	NP_038497
Location (UCSC)	Chr 10: 80.15 – 80.21 Mb	Chr 14: 25.84 – 25.89 Mb
PubMed search
- Wikidata
View/Edit Human	View/Edit Mouse

Annexin A11 is a protein that in humans is encoded by the ANXA11 gene.

== Function ==
This gene encodes a member of the annexin family, a group of calcium-dependent phospholipid-binding proteins. Annexins have unique N-terminal domains and conserved C-terminal domains, which contain the calcium-dependent phospholipid-binding sites. The encoded protein is a 56-kD antigen recognized by sera from patients with various autoimmune diseases. Transcript variants encoding the same isoform have been identified.

== Interactions ==
ANXA11 has been shown to interact with PDCD6.

== Clinical significance ==
It is shown that over-expression of the ANXA11 is involved in apoptotic alterations in schizophrenia and contribute to pathomechanisms of this disorder.
