= ALG9 =

Protein-coding gene in the species Homo sapiens

Identifiers
- Aliases: ALG9, CDG1L, DIBD1, LOH11CR1J, alpha-1,2-mannosyltransferase, GIKANIS, ALG9 alpha-1,2-mannosyltransferase
- External IDs: OMIM: 606941; MGI: 1924753; GeneCards: ALG9
Enzyme activity
EC #	BRENDA	ExPASy	KEGG	MetaCyc
2.4.1.259	↗	↗	↗	↗
2.4.1.261	↗	↗	↗	↗

Gene location (Human)
Chr.	Chromosome 11 (human)
Band	11q23.1	Start	111,782,195 bp
Band	11q23.1	End	111,871,581 bp

Gene location (Mouse)
Chr.	Chromosome 9 (mouse)
Band	9|9 A5.3	Start	50,686,319 bp
Band	9|9 A5.3	End	50,754,842 bp
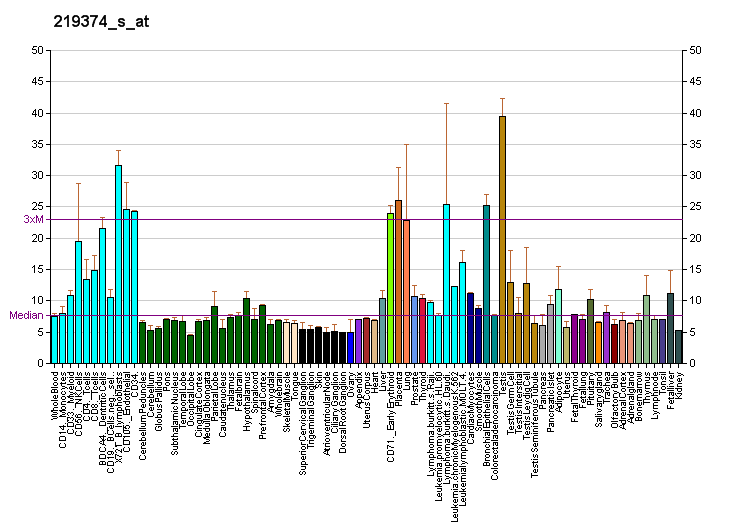
RNA expression pattern
Bgee	Human / Mouse (ortholog); Top expressed in: endothelial cell; body of pancreas; ganglionic eminence; skin of leg; ventricular zone; skin of abdomen; bone marrow cell; gastric mucosa; stromal cell of endometrium; left coronary artery / Top expressed in: spermatocyte; parotid gland; spermatid; primary oocyte; tail of embryo; neural tube; endocardial cushion; seminal vesicula; lacrimal gland; submandibular gland; More reference expression data
BioGPS	More reference expression data
Gene ontology
Molecular function	transferase activity; mannosyltransferase activity; dol-P-Man:Man(8)GlcNAc(2)-PP-Dol alpha-1,2-mannosyltransferase activity; dol-P-Man:Man(6)GlcNAc(2)-PP-Dol alpha-1,2-mannosyltransferase activity; glycosyltransferase activity; alpha-1,2-mannosyltransferase activity
Cellular component	integral component of membrane; endoplasmic reticulum membrane; membrane; endoplasmic reticulum
Biological process	protein glycosylation; dolichol-linked oligosaccharide biosynthetic process; mannosylation
Sources:Amigo / QuickGO
Orthologs
Databases	NCBI: entry; OMA: entry
Species	Human	Mouse
Entrez	79796	102580
Ensembl	ENSG00000086848	ENSMUSG00000032059
UniProt	Q9H6U8	Q8VDI9
RefSeq (mRNA)	NM_001077690; NM_001077691; NM_001077692; NM_024740; NM_001352409 NM_001352410; NM_001352411; NM_001352412; NM_001352413; NM_001352414; NM_001352415; NM_001352416; NM_001352417; NM_001352418; NM_001352419; NM_001352420; NM_001352421; NM_001352422; NM_001352423	NM_133981
RefSeq (protein)	NP_001071158; NP_001071159; NP_001071160; NP_079016; NP_001339338 NP_001339339; NP_001339340; NP_001339341; NP_001339342; NP_001339343; NP_001339344; NP_001339345; NP_001339346; NP_001339347; NP_001339348; NP_001339349; NP_001339350; NP_001339351; NP_001339352	NP_598742
Location (UCSC)	Chr 11: 111.78 – 111.87 Mb	Chr 9: 50.69 – 50.75 Mb
PubMed search
- Wikidata
View/Edit Human	View/Edit Mouse

Alpha-1,2-mannosyltransferase ALG9 is an enzyme that in humans is encoded by the ALG9 gene.
