= PDCD6 =

Protein-coding gene in the species Homo sapiens

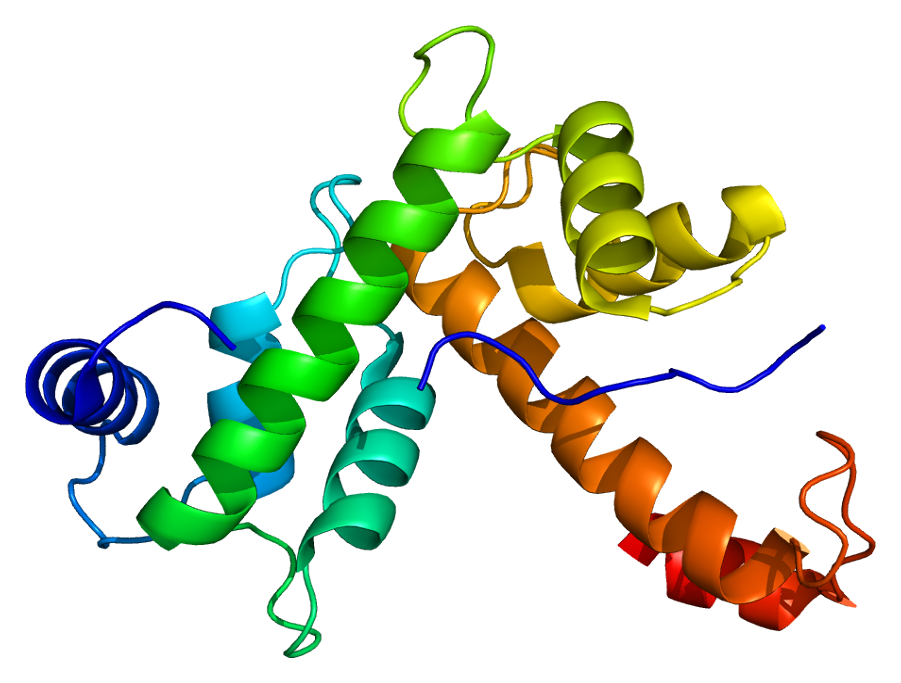

Identifiers
- Aliases: PDCD6, ALG-2, PEF1B, ALG2, programmed cell death 6
- External IDs: OMIM: 601057; MGI: 109283; GeneCards: PDCD6
Available structures
PDB	Ortholog search: PDBe RCSB
PDB	List of PDB id codes 2ZN8, 2ZN9, 2ZND, 2ZNE, 2ZRS, 2ZRT, 3AAJ, 3AAK, 3WXA

Gene location (Human)
Chr.	Chromosome 5 (human)
Band	5p15.33	Start	271,621 bp
Band	5p15.33	End	314,974 bp

Gene location (Mouse)
Chr.	Chromosome 13 (mouse)
Band	13|13 C1	Start	74,451,628 bp
Band	13|13 C1	End	74,465,699 bp
RNA expression pattern
Bgee	Human / Mouse (ortholog); Top expressed in: stromal cell of endometrium; mucosa of transverse colon; right adrenal cortex; prefrontal cortex; left adrenal gland; left adrenal cortex; rectum; Brodmann area 9; gonad; anterior pituitary / Top expressed in: jejunum; duodenum; ileum; epithelium of small intestine; right kidney; endothelial cell of lymphatic vessel; Epithelium of choroid plexus; vestibular sensory epithelium; endocardial cushion; fetal liver hematopoietic progenitor cell; More reference expression data
BioGPS	n/a
Gene ontology
Molecular function	protein dimerization activity; protein-membrane adaptor activity; calcium-dependent protein binding; metal ion binding; calcium-dependent cysteine-type endopeptidase activity; protein binding; identical protein binding; molecular adaptor activity; magnesium ion binding; calcium ion binding; protein homodimerization activity; protein-macromolecule adaptor activity
Cellular component	cytoplasm; endosome; endoplasmic reticulum membrane; membrane; endoplasmic reticulum; extracellular exosome; nucleus; Golgi membrane; COPII vesicle coat; Cul3-RING ubiquitin ligase complex; endoplasmic reticulum exit site; ER to Golgi transport vesicle membrane; cytoplasmic vesicle
Biological process	negative regulation of protein kinase B signaling; cellular response to heat; vascular endothelial growth factor receptor-2 signaling pathway; positive regulation of endothelial cell proliferation; negative regulation of vascular endothelial growth factor receptor signaling pathway; positive regulation of angiogenesis; positive regulation of endothelial cell migration; response to calcium ion; negative regulation of TOR signaling; positive regulation of cysteine-type endopeptidase activity involved in apoptotic process; angiogenesis; apoptotic signaling pathway; intracellular protein transport; activation of cysteine-type endopeptidase activity involved in apoptotic process; apoptotic process; proteolysis; endoplasmic reticulum to Golgi vesicle-mediated transport; neural crest formation; neural crest cell development; COPII vesicle coating; positive regulation of protein monoubiquitination
Sources:Amigo / QuickGO
Orthologs
Databases	NCBI: entry; OMA: entry
Species	Human	Mouse
Entrez	10016	18570
Ensembl	ENSG00000249915	ENSMUSG00000021576
UniProt	O75340	P12815
RefSeq (mRNA)	NM_001267556; NM_001267557; NM_001267558; NM_001267559; NM_013232	NM_011051; NM_001359996
RefSeq (protein)	NP_001254485; NP_001254486; NP_001254487; NP_001254488; NP_037364	NP_035181; NP_001346925
Location (UCSC)	Chr 5: 0.27 – 0.31 Mb	Chr 13: 74.45 – 74.47 Mb
PubMed search
- Wikidata
View/Edit Human	View/Edit Mouse

Programmed cell death protein 6 is a protein that in humans is encoded by the PDCD6 gene.

This gene encodes a calcium-binding protein belonging to the penta-EF-hand protein family. Calcium binding is important for homodimerization and for conformational changes required for binding to other protein partners. This gene product participates in T cell receptor-, Fas-, and glucocorticoid-induced programmed cell death. In mice deficient for this gene product, however, apoptosis was not blocked suggesting this gene product is functionally redundant.

== Interactions ==
PDCD6 has been shown to interact with ASK1, PDCD6IP, Fas receptor, ANXA11 and PEF1.
