= ALG2 =

Protein-coding gene in the species Homo sapiens

Identifiers
- Aliases: ALG2, CDGIi, NET38, hALPG2, CMS14, CMSTA3, alpha-1,3/1,6-mannosyltransferase, CDG1I, ALG2 alpha-1,3/1,6-mannosyltransferase
- External IDs: OMIM: 607905; MGI: 1914731; GeneCards: ALG2
Enzyme activity
EC #	BRENDA	ExPASy	KEGG	MetaCyc
2.4.1.132	↗	↗	↗	↗
2.4.1.257	↗	↗	↗	↗

Gene location (Mouse)
Chr.	Chromosome 4 (mouse)
Band	4|4 B1	Start	47,465,067 bp
Band	4|4 B1	End	47,474,333 bp
RNA expression pattern
Bgee	Human / Mouse (ortholog); Top expressed in: pancreatic epithelial cell; corpus epididymis; caput epididymis; secondary oocyte; germinal epithelium; tibia; islet of Langerhans; body of pancreas; visceral pleura; parietal pleura / Top expressed in: median eminence; dorsomedial hypothalamic nucleus; paraventricular nucleus of hypothalamus; supraoptic nucleus; arcuate nucleus; dorsal tegmental nucleus; ventral tegmental area; suprachiasmatic nucleus; habenula; lateral hypothalamus; More reference expression data
BioGPS	n/a
Gene ontology
Molecular function	GDP-Man:Man1GlcNAc2-PP-Dol alpha-1,3-mannosyltransferase activity; transferase activity; protein N-terminus binding; protein heterodimerization activity; glycosyltransferase activity; protein binding; calcium-dependent protein binding; alpha-1,3-mannosyltransferase activity; GDP-Man:Man2GlcNAc2-PP-dolichol alpha-1,6-mannosyltransferase activity
Cellular component	cytoplasm; integral component of membrane; nucleus; membrane; perinuclear region of cytoplasm; endoplasmic reticulum membrane; cytosol; actin cytoskeleton
Biological process	response to calcium ion; protein glycosylation; dolichol-linked oligosaccharide biosynthetic process; mannosylation; oligosaccharide-lipid intermediate biosynthetic process
Sources:Amigo / QuickGO
Orthologs
Databases	NCBI: entry
Species	Human	Mouse
Entrez	85365	56737
Ensembl	n/a	ENSMUSG00000039740
UniProt	Q9H553	Q9DBE8
RefSeq (mRNA)	NM_033087; NM_197973	NM_019998; NM_001355496
RefSeq (protein)	NP_149078	NP_064382; NP_001342425
Location (UCSC)	n/a	Chr 4: 47.47 – 47.47 Mb
PubMed search
- Wikidata
View/Edit Human	View/Edit Mouse

Alpha-1,3/1,6-mannosyltransferase ALG2 is an enzyme that is encoded by the ALG2 gene. Mutations in the human gene are associated with congenital defects in glycosylation The protein encoded by the ALG2 gene belongs to two classes of enzymes: GDP-Man:Man1GlcNAc2-PP-dolichol alpha-1,3-mannosyltransferase (EC 2.4.1.132) and GDP-Man:Man2GlcNAc2-PP-dolichol alpha-1,6-mannosyltransferase (EC 2.4.1.257).

== Function ==
This gene encodes a member of the glycosyltransferase 1 family. The encoded protein acts as an alpha 1,3 mannosyltransferase, mannosylating Man(2)GlcNAc(2)-dolichol diphosphate and Man(1)GlcNAc(2)-dolichol diphosphate to form Man(3)GlcNAc(2)-dolichol diphosphate. Defects in this gene have been associated with congenital disorder of glycosylation type Ih (CDG-Ii).
