= Dolichyl-P-Man:Man8GlcNAc2-PP-dolichol alpha-1,2-mannosyltransferase =

Class of enzymes

Identifiers
- EC no.: 2.4.1.261

Databases
- IntEnz: IntEnz view
- BRENDA: BRENDA entry
- ExPASy: NiceZyme view
- KEGG: KEGG entry
- MetaCyc: metabolic pathway
- PRIAM: profile
- PDB structures: RCSB PDB PDBe PDBsum
Search
- PMC: articles
- PubMed: articles
- NCBI: proteins

Dolichyl-P-Man:Man8GlcNAc2-PP-dolichol alpha-1,2-mannosyltransferase (EC 2.4.1.261, ALG9, ALG9 alpha1,2 mannosyltransferase, dolichylphosphomannose-dependent ALG9 mannosyltransferase, ALG9 mannosyltransferase, Dol-P-Man:Man8GlcNAc2-PP-Dol alpha-1,2-mannosyltransferase) is an enzyme with systematic name dolichyl beta-D-mannosyl phosphate:D-Man-alpha-(1->2)-D-Man-alpha-(1->2)-D-Man-alpha-(1->3)-(D-Man-alpha-(1->2)-D-Man-alpha-(1->3)-(D-Man-alpha-(1->6))-D-Man-alpha-(1->6))-D-Man-beta-(1->4)-D-GlcNAc-beta-(1->4)-D-GlcNAc-diphosphodolichol 2-alpha-D-mannosyltransferase. This enzyme catalyses the following chemical reaction

dolichyl beta-D-mannosyl phosphate + D-Man-alpha-(1->2)-D-Man-alpha-(1->2)-D-Man-alpha-(1->3)-[D-Man-alpha-(1->2)-D-Man-alpha-(1->3)-[D-Man-alpha-(1->6)]-D-Man-alpha-(1->6)]-D-Man-beta-(1->4)-D-GlcNAc-beta-(1->4)-D-GlcNAc-diphosphodolichol $\rightleftharpoons$ D-Man-alpha-(1->2)-D-Man-alpha-(1->2)-D-Man-alpha-(1->3)-[D-Man-alpha-(1->2)-D-Man-alpha-(1->3)-[D-Man-alpha-(1->2)-D-Man-alpha-(1->6)]-D-Man-alpha-(1->6)]-D-Man-beta-(1->4)-D-GlcNAc-beta-(1->4)-D-GlcNAc-diphosphodolichol + dolichyl phosphate

The formation of N-glycosidic linkages of glycoproteins involves the ordered assembly of the common Glc3Man9GlcNAc2 core-oligosaccharide on the lipid carrier dolichyl diphosphate.
