= Guanosine diphosphate mannose =

Names
- IUPAC name Guanosine 5′-(α-D-mannopyranosyl dihydrogen diphosphate)
- Systematic IUPAC name O^{1}-{[(2R,3S,4R,5R)-5-(2-Amino-6-oxo-1,6-dihydro-9H-purin-9-yl)-3,4-dihydroxyoxolan-2-yl]methyl} O^{3}-[(2R,3S,4S,5S,6R)-3,4,5-trihydroxy-6-(hydroxymethyl)oxan-2-yl] dihydrogen diphosphate

Identifiers
CAS Number	3123-67-9
3D model (JSmol)	Interactive image
ChEBI	CHEBI:15820
ChemSpider	17372
MeSH	Guanosine+Diphosphate+Mannose
PubChem CID	18396
UNII	SA0B77H8CS
CompTox Dashboard (EPA)	DTXSID201027237
- InChI: InChI=1S/C16H25N5O16P2/c17-16-19-12-6(13(28)20-16)18-3-21(12)14-10(26)8(24)5(34-14)2-33-38(29,30)37-39(31,32)36-15-11(27)9(25)7(23)4(1-22)35-15/h3-5,7-11,14-15,22-27H,1-2H2,(H,29,30)(H,31,32)(H3,17,19,20,28)/t4-,5-,7-,8-,9+,10-,11+,14-,15-/m1/s1 Key: MVMSCBBUIHUTGJ-GDJBGNAASA-N; InChI=1/C16H25N5O16P2/c17-16-19-12-6(13(28)20-16)18-3-21(12)14-10(26)8(24)5(34-14)2-33-38(29,30)37-39(31,32)36-15-11(27)9(25)7(23)4(1-22)35-15/h3-5,7-11,14-15,22-27H,1-2H2,(H,29,30)(H,31,32)(H3,17,19,20,28)/t4-,5-,7-,8-,9+,10-,11+,14-,15-/m1/s1 Key: MVMSCBBUIHUTGJ-GDJBGNAABK
- SMILES: O=P(O[C@H]1O[C@@H]([C@@H](O)[C@H](O)[C@@H]1O)CO)(O)OP(=O)(O)OC[C@H]4O[C@@H](n2c3NC(=N/C(=O)c3nc2)\N)[C@H](O)[C@@H]4O

Properties
Chemical formula	C_{16}H_{25}N_{5}O_{16}P_{2}
Molar mass	605.341 g/mol
- Except where otherwise noted, data are given for materials in their standard state (at 25 °C [77 °F], 100 kPa). verify (what is ?) Infobox references

Guanosine diphosphate mannose or GDP-mannose is a nucleotide sugar that is a substrate for glycosyltransferase reactions in metabolism. This compound is a substrate for enzymes called mannosyltransferases.

Known as donor of activated mannose in all glycolytic reactions, GDP-mannose is essential in eukaryotes.

== Biosynthesis ==
GDP-mannose is produced from GTP and mannose 1-phosphate by the enzyme mannose-1-phosphate guanylyltransferase (GDP-mannose pyrophosphorylase, GDP-MP). This enzyme belongs to a family of nucleotidyl-transferases and is a pervasive enzyme found in bacteria, fungi, plants, and animals.

== See also ==
- Nucleoside
- Nucleotide
- Guanosine
- Guanosine diphosphate
