= GmhB =

GmhB may refer to:

- D-glycero-alpha-D-manno-heptose 1,7-bisphosphate 7-phosphatase
- D-glycero-beta-D-manno-heptose 1,7-bisphosphate 7-phosphatase

== See also ==
- Gesellschaft mit beschränkter Haftung, abbreviated GmbH
