= RfaE (gene) =

RfaE (gene) may refer to:

- D-glycero-beta-D-manno-heptose-7-phosphate kinase, an enzyme
- D-glycero-beta-D-manno-heptose 1-phosphate adenylyltransferase, an enzyme
