= HDDA =

HDDA may refer to:

- D-glycero-alpha-D-manno-heptose-7-phosphate kinase
- Hexadehydro Diels-Alder reaction
