= D-beta-D-heptose 7-phosphate kinase/D-beta-D-heptose 1-phosphate adenylyltransferase =

D-beta-D-heptose 7-phosphate kinase/D-beta-D-heptose 1-phosphate adenylyltransferase may refer to:

- D-glycero-beta-D-manno-heptose-7-phosphate kinase, an enzyme
- D-glycero-beta-D-manno-heptose 1-phosphate adenylyltransferase, an enzyme
