= HLDE =

HLDE may refer to:

- Daegu Broadcasting Corporation
- HldE, the name of several genes
