= D-glycero-alpha-D-manno-heptose-7-phosphate kinase =

Identifiers
- EC no.: 2.7.1.168

Databases
- IntEnz: IntEnz view
- BRENDA: BRENDA entry
- ExPASy: NiceZyme view
- KEGG: KEGG entry
- MetaCyc: metabolic pathway
- PRIAM: profile
- PDB structures: RCSB PDB PDBe PDBsum
Search
- PMC: articles
- PubMed: articles
- NCBI: proteins

D-glycero-alpha-D-manno-heptose-7-phosphate kinase (EC 2.7.1.168, D-alpha-D-heptose-7-phosphate kinase, hdda (gene)) is an enzyme with systematic name ATP:D-glycero-alpha-D-manno-heptose 7-phosphate 1-phosphotransferase. It catalyses the following chemical reaction

ATP +
D-glycero-α-D-manno-heptose 7-phosphate
ADP +
D-glycero-α-D-manno-heptose 1,7-bisphosphate

The enzyme characterised from the bacterium Aneurinibacillus thermoaerophilus converts D-glycero-α-D-manno-heptose 7-phosphate to D-glycero-α-D-manno-heptose 1,7-bisphosphate by transferring a phosphate group from the cofactor, adenosine triphosphate (ATP), which is converted to adenosine diphosphate (ADP).

The product is used in the biosynthesis of GDP-D-glycero-α-D-manno-heptose by the action of D-glycero-α-D-manno-heptose 1,7-bisphosphate 7-phosphatase and D-glycero-α-D-manno-heptose 1-phosphate guanylyltransferase.
