= Akkattu T. Biju =

Indian organic chemist

Akkattu T. Biju is an Indian organic chemist who is an associate professor in the Department of Organic Chemistry at the Indian Institute of Science, Bengaluru. He was awarded the Shanti Swarup Bhatnagar Prize, Indian national award for excellence in scientific research, for Chemical Sciences for the year 2022, for his work on transition-metal-free carbon-carbon and carbon-heteroatom bond-forming reactions using aryne chemistry and carbene-based organocatalysis.

== Education and career ==
Biju has a BSc degree in chemistry (Petrochemicals) from Mahatma Gandhi University, Kerala, in 1998 and M Sc degree in chemistry from the same university in 2001. He did his doctoral work at the Organic Chemistry Division of the National Institute for Interdisciplinary Science and Technology (NIIST), Thiruvananthapuram under Vijay Nair and obtained his PhD in 2007. He then spent an year at National Taiwan University, Taiwan, as a post-doctoral fellow. This was followed by a three-year Alexander von Humboldt Post-Doctoral Fellowship at University of Münster. Returning to India in 2011, he joined CSIR-National Chemical Laboratory (NCL), Pune as a Senior Scientist. In June 2017, Biju joined the Department of Organic Chemistry at Indian Institute of Science as an associate professor.

== Research ==
Biju heads a research group in the Organic Chemistry Division of the Indian Institute of Science which specializes in developing methodologies for solving problems related to reaction discovery and targeted synthesis. The group focuses on the research areas of aryne chemistry, asymmetric catalysis, donor-acceptor cyclopropanes and N-heterocyclic carbene organocatalysis.

== Awards and recognition ==
The awards and honors conferred on Akkattu T. Biju include the following:

- Organization of Pharmaceutical Producers of India Young Scientist Award (2012)
- Young Scientist Platinum Jubilee Award, National Academy of Sciences, India (2013)
- National Chemical Laboratory Research Foundation Scientist of the Year Award (2014)
- Indian Society for Chemists and Biologists Young Scientist Award (2014)
- Thieme Chemistry Journals Award (2014)
- Chemical Research Society of India Young Scientist Award (2015)
- A V Rama Rao Research Foundation Young Scientist Award (2016)
- Editor-in-Chief, J. Heterocyclic Chem. (Wiley)
- Bhagyatara Award by Panjab University (2018)
- SERB Distinguished Investigator Award (2018)
- Fellow of Royal Society of Chemistry (2019)
- Chemical Research Society of India Bronze Medal, (2019)
- Fellow of Indian Academy of Sciences (2022)
- Shanti Swarup Bhatnagar Prize 2022

== Publications ==
=== Books ===
- Akkattu T Biju (May 2021). Modern Aryne Chemistry (1 ed.). Wiley-VCH. ISBN 978-3527346462. (Amazon)
- Akkattu T. Biju (March 2019). N-Heterocyclic Carbenes in Organocatalysis (1 ed.). Wiley-VCH. ISBN 978-3527343102. (Amazon)

=== Research papers ===
Akkattu T. Biju has more than 140 publications in various peer reviewed research journals.
