= D-glycero-beta-D-manno-heptose 1,7-bisphosphate 7-phosphatase =

Class of enzymes

D-glycero-β-D-manno-heptose 1,7-bisphosphate 7-phosphatase

Identifiers
- EC no.: 3.1.3.82

Databases
- BRENDA: enzyme data
- ExPASy: NiceZyme view
- KEGG: enzyme entry
- MetaCyc: metabolic pathway
- Rhea: reactions
- PDB structures: RCSB PDB PDBe PDBsum
Search
- PMC: articles
- PubMed: articles
- NCBI: proteins

D-glycero-β-D-manno-heptose 1,7-bisphosphate 7-phosphatase (EC 3.1.3.82) is an enzyme with systematic name D-glycero-β-D-manno-heptose 1,7-bisphosphate 7-phosphohydrolase. It catalyses the following chemical reaction

D-glycero-β-D-manno-heptose 1,7-bisphosphate
H_{2}O
P_{i}
D-glycero-β-D-manno-heptose 1-phosphate

The enzyme characterised from Escherichia coli hydrolyses D-glycero-β-D-manno-heptose 1,7-bisphosphate to D-glycero-β-D-manno-heptose 1-phosphate and orthophosphate (P_{i}). The structure of the enzyme from Burkholderia thailandensis has been determined by X-ray crystallography.

The product is acted on by the enzyme D-glycero-beta-D-manno-heptose 1-phosphate adenylyltransferase to give the adenosine diphosphate (ADP) derivative, ADP-L-glycero-β-D-manno-heptose.
