= Pyridyne =

Group of chemical compounds

Pyridynes

Pyridyne in chemistry is the pyridine analogue of benzyne. Pyridynes are the class of reactive intermediates derived from pyridine. Two isomers exist, the 2,3-pyridine (2,3-didehydropyridine) and the 3,4-pyridyne (3,4-didehydropyridine). The reaction of 3-bromo-4-chloropyridine with furan and lithium amalgam gives 1,4-epoxy-dihydroquinoline through the 2,3-pyridyne intermediate. The reaction of 4-bromopyridine with sodium in liquid ammonia gives both 3-aminopyridine and 4-aminopyridine through the 3,4-pyridyne intermediate and an E1cB-elimination reaction.

== History ==
Pyridynes were first postulated by Levine and Leake in 1955. In 1969 Zoltewicz and Nisi trapped 3,4-pyridyne in a reaction of 3-bromopyridine with methylmercaptan and sodium amide in ammonia. The methylthio and amino pyridines were found to be formed in the same ratio.

In 1972 Kramer and Berry inferred the formation of 3,4-pyridyne in gas-phase photolysis of pyridine-3-diazonium-4-carboxylate via time-of-flight mass spectrometry. The dimer compound diazabiphenylene was detected. In 1988 Nam and Leroy reported the matrix isolation (13K, Ar) of 3,4-pyridyne by photolysis of 3,4-pyridinedicarboxylic anhydride with the IR-spectrum revealing an acetylenic bond in the same way as ortho-benzyne.

== Scope ==
Strategies involving pyridynes have been employed in the total syntheses of ellipticine and (S)-Macrostomine.
