= ADP-glyceromanno-heptose 6-epimerase =

Identifiers
- EC no.: 5.1.3.20
- CAS no.: 85030-75-7

Databases
- IntEnz: IntEnz view
- BRENDA: BRENDA entry
- ExPASy: NiceZyme view
- KEGG: KEGG entry
- MetaCyc: metabolic pathway
- PRIAM: profile
- PDB structures: RCSB PDB PDBe PDBsum
- Gene Ontology: AmiGO / QuickGO
Search
- PMC: articles
- PubMed: articles
- NCBI: proteins

ADP-L-glycero-D-manno-heptose 6-epimerase (EC 5.1.3.20) is an enzyme that catalyzes the chemical reaction

ADP-D-glycero-β-D-manno-heptose
ADP-L-glycero-β-D-manno-heptose

The enzyme characterised from Escherichia coli takes the adenosine diphosphate derivative made by D-glycero-β-D-manno-heptose 1-phosphate adenylyltransferase and inverts the stereochemistry at a single position, forming the diastereomer, ADP-L-glycero-β-D-manno-heptose. The product is used by bacteria to make glycoproteins and polysaccharides.

This enzyme belongs to the family of isomerases, specifically those racemases and epimerases acting on carbohydrates and derivatives. The systematic name of this enzyme class is ADP-L-glycero-D-manno-heptose 6-epimerase. It uses the cofactor, nicotinamide adenine dinucleotide phosphate, in a direct oxidation mechanism.

== Structural studies ==
As of 2007, only one structure has been solved for this class of enzymes, with the PDB accession code PDB: 1EQ2.
