= D-glycero-alpha-D-manno-heptose 1,7-bisphosphate 7-phosphatase =

D-glycero-α-D-manno-heptose 1,7-bisphosphate 7-phosphatase

Identifiers
- EC no.: 3.1.3.83

Databases
- BRENDA: enzyme data
- ExPASy: NiceZyme view
- KEGG: enzyme entry
- MetaCyc: metabolic pathway
- Rhea: reactions
- PDB structures: RCSB PDB PDBe PDBsum
Search
- PMC: articles
- PubMed: articles
- NCBI: proteins

D-glycero-α-D-manno-heptose 1,7-bisphosphate 7-phosphatase (EC 3.1.3.83) is an enzyme with systematic name D-glycero-α-D-manno-heptose 1,7-bisphosphate 7-phosphohydrolase. It catalyses a chemical reaction in which one of the phosphate groups in D-glycero-α-D-manno-heptose 1,7-bisphosphate is removed by hydrolysis, leaving the second phosphate group at the anomeric centre.

D-glycero-α-D-manno-heptose 1,7-bisphosphate
H_{2}O
P_{i}
D-glycero-α-D-manno-heptose 1-phosphate

The reaction is part of the biosynthesis of GDP-D-glycero-α-D-manno-heptose when the product is acted on by the enzyme D-glycero-α-D-manno-heptose 1-phosphate guanylyltransferase.
