= Hexadehydro Diels–Alder reaction =

Chemical reaction

In organic chemistry, the hexadehydro-Diels–Alder (HDDA) reaction is an organic chemical reaction between a diyne (2 alkyne functional groups arranged in a conjugated system) and an alkyne to form a reactive benzyne species, via a [4+2] cycloaddition reaction. This benzyne intermediate then reacts with a suitable trapping agent to form a substituted aromatic product. This reaction is a derivative of the established Diels–Alder reaction and proceeds via a similar [4+2] cycloaddition mechanism. The HDDA reaction is particularly effective for forming heavily functionalized aromatic systems and multiple ring systems in one synthetic step.

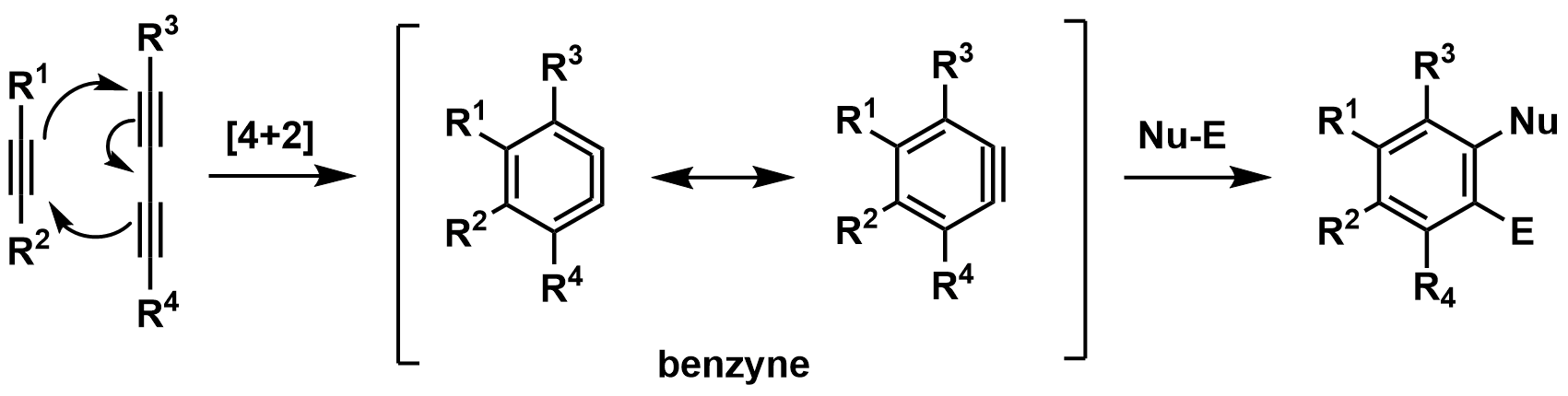
HDDA figure - Generalized (2)

== Reaction mechanism ==
Depending on the substrate chosen, the HDDA reaction can be initiated thermally or by the addition of a suitable catalyst, often a transition metal. The prevailing mechanism for the thermally-initiated HDDA reaction is a [4+2] cycloaddition between a conjugated diyne (1,3-dialkyne) and an alkyne (often referred to as a diynophile in analogy to the Diels–Alder dienophile) to form an ortho-benzyne species. The metal-catalyzed HDDA is thought to proceed through a similar pathway, forming a metal-stabilized benzyne, which is then trapped.

The simplest model of an HDDA reaction is the cycloaddition of butadiyne and acetylene to form ortho-benzyne (o-benzyne, shown below). This reactive intermediate (denoted by brackets) subsequently reacts with a generalized trapping reagent that consists of a nucleophilic (Nu-) and electrophilic (El-) site, giving the benzenoid product shown.

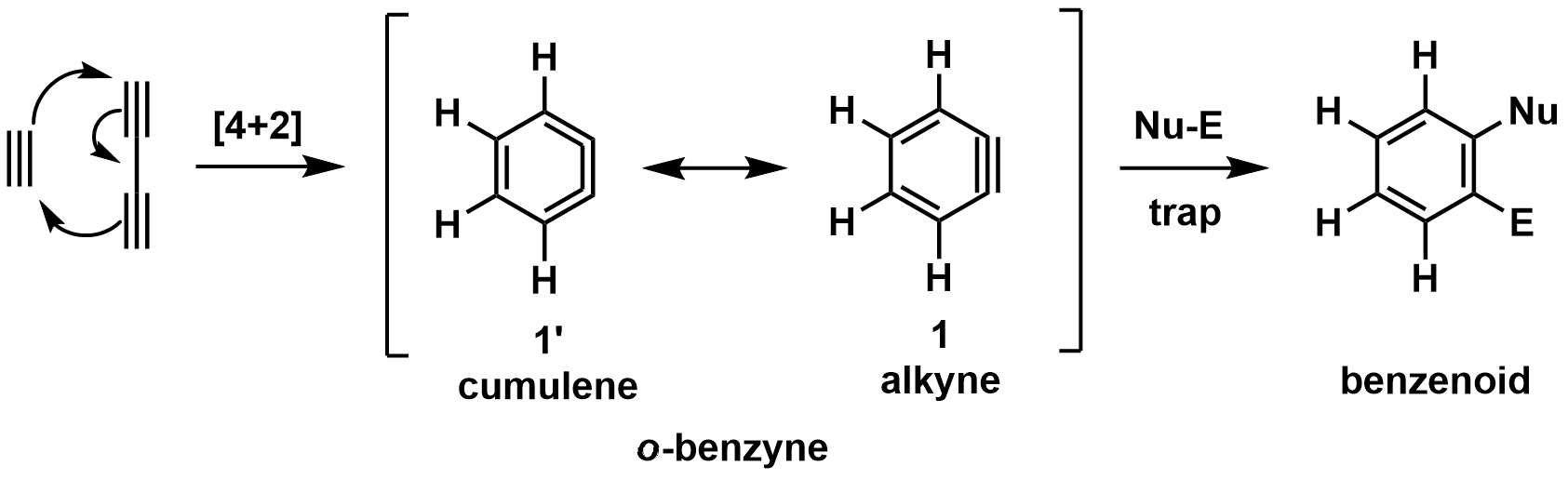
HDDA figure 1 - Simple

The o-benzyne intermediate can be visualized in the two resonance (chemistry) forms illustrated above. The most commonly depicted form is the alkyne (1), but the cumulene (1’) form can be helpful in visualizing ring formation by [4+2] cycloaddition.

=== Thermodynamics and kinetics ===
The HDDA reaction is often thermodynamically favorable (exothermic), but can have a significant kinetic barrier to reaction (high activation energy). Calculations have suggested that the formation of unsubstituted o-benzyne (from butadiyne and acetylene, above) has an activation energy of 36 kcal mol^{−1}, but is thermodynamically favorable, estimated to be exothermic by -51 kcal mol^{−1}. As a result of higher activation energy, some HDDA reactions require heating to elevated temperatures (>100 °C) in order to initiate.

Furthermore, the benzyne trapping step is also thermodynamically favourable, calculated to be an additional -73 kcal mol^{−1} for trapping of an ester-substituted o-benzyne with tert-butanol.

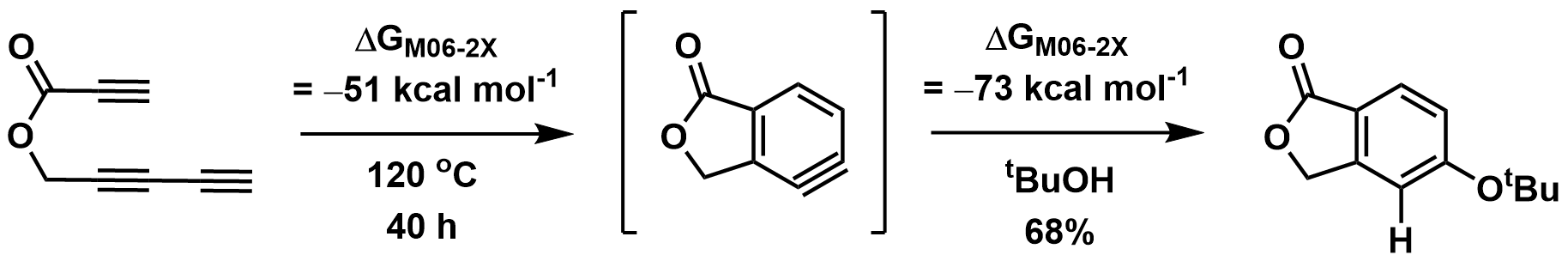
HDDA figure - Thermo

The HDDA [4+2] cycloaddition can occur via either a concerted pathway or a stepwise reaction, diradical pathway. These two pathways can differ in activation energy depending on substrate and reaction system. Computational studies have suggested that while both pathways are comparable in activation energy for unactivated (unsubstituted) diynophiles, the stepwise pathway has a lower activation energy barrier, and so is the dominant pathway, for activated diynophiles.

=== Regiochemistry ===
The regiochemistry of non-symmetrical HDDA-derived benzyne trapping can be explained by a combination of electronic and ring distortion effects. Computationally, the more obtuse angle (a) corresponds to the more electron deficient (δ+) benzyne carbon, leading to attack of the nucleophilic component at this site. Consequently, the electrophilic component adds at the more electron rich (δ-) site (b).

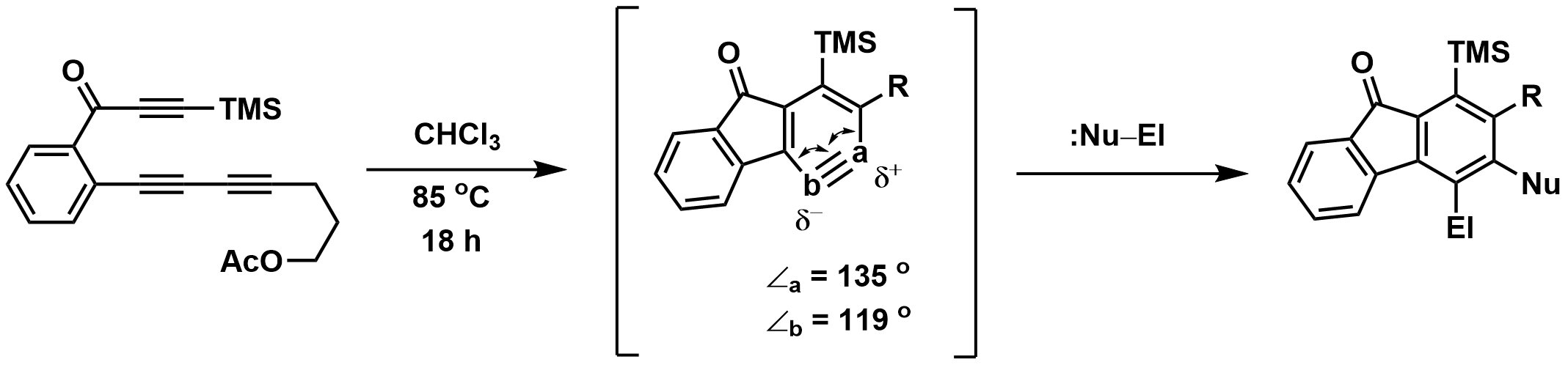
HDDA figure - bond angles

=== Terminology ===
The HDDA reaction is a derivative of, and mechanistically related to, the classical Diels–Alder reaction. As described by Hoye and coworkers, the HDDA reaction can be viewed conceptually as a member of a series of pericyclic reactions with increasing unsaturation (by incremental removal of hydrogen pairs). The “hexadehydro” descriptor is derived from this interpretation, as the simplest HDDA reaction product (o-benzyne, 4 hydrogens) has 6 fewer hydrogen atoms than the simplest Diels–Alder reaction product (cyclohexene, 10 hydrogens).

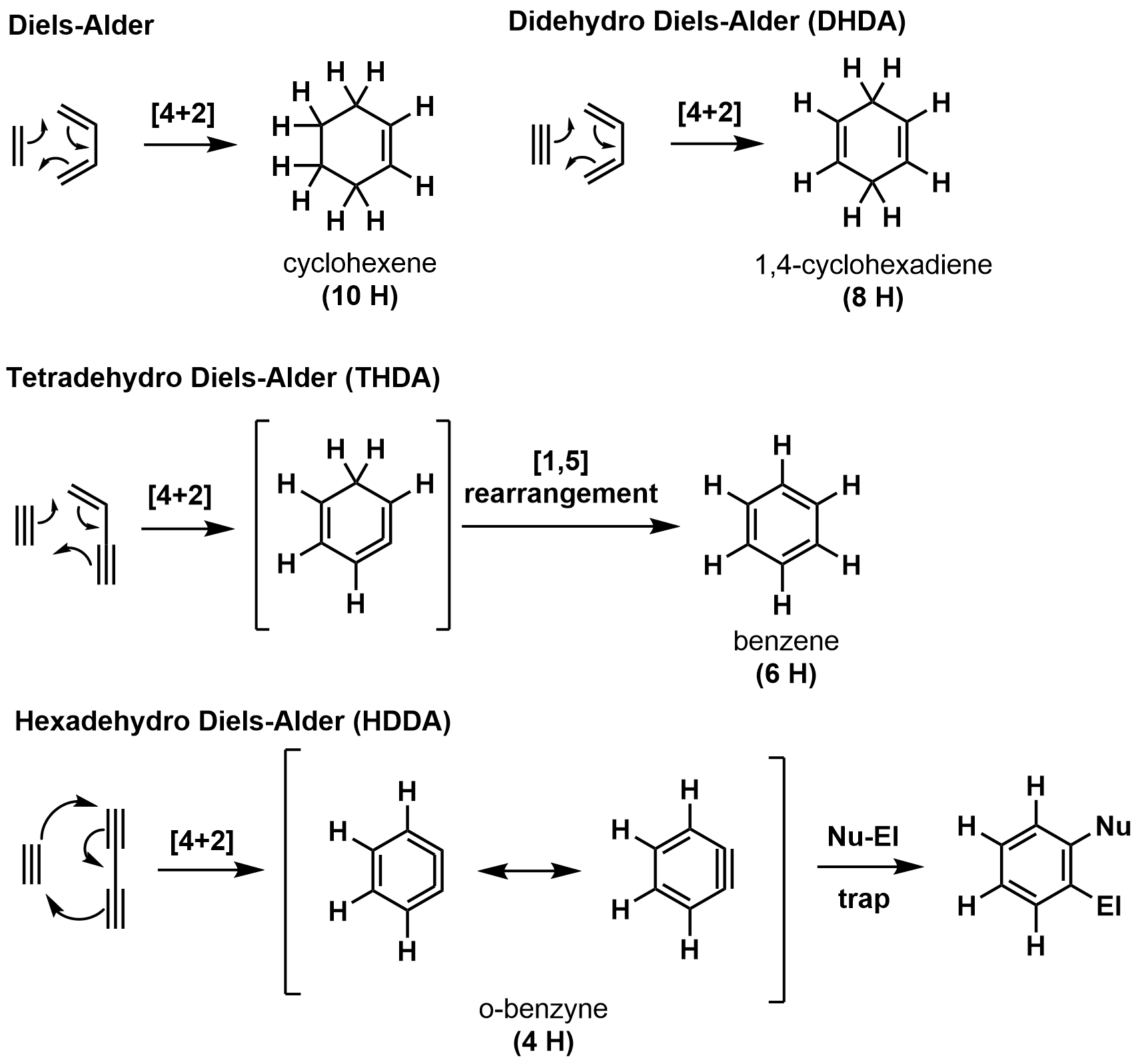
HDDA figure 2 - DA-DHDA-THDA-HDDA comparison

Formally, the hexadehydro Diels–Alder reaction describes only the formation of the benzyne, but this species is an unstable intermediate that reacts readily with a variety of trapping partners, including reaction solvents. Thus, in practice the HDDA reaction describes a two-step cascade reaction of benzyne formation and trapping to yield the final product.

== Historical development ==
The first examples of the HDDA reaction were reported independently in 1997 by the groups of Ueda and Johnson. Johnson and co-workers observed the cyclization of 1,3,8-nonatriyne under flash vacuum thermolysis (600 °C, 10^{−2} torr) to form two products, indane and the dehydrogenation product indene, in 95% combined yield. Deuterium labeling studies suggested that the product was formed by a [4+2] cycloaddition to a benzyne intermediate, followed by in-situ reduction to form the observed products. Ueda and co-workers observed that acyclic tetraynes cyclized at room temperature to form 5H-fluorenol derivatives. The formation of a benzyne intermediate was determined by trapping studies, using benzene or anthracene to trap the benzyne as a Diels–Alder adduct. Ueda and co-workers further elaborated on this method in subsequent reports, trapping the benzyne using a variety of nucleophiles (oxygen, nitrogen, and sulfur-based), as well as synthesizing larger, fused-ring aromatic systems.

While known for over a decade, the HDDA reaction did not come into wider synthetic use until 2012, when Hoye and co-workers conducted a thorough investigation into the scope and utility of this cycloaddition. That paper referred to this diyne–diynophile reaction as the“hexadehydro Diels–Alder (HDDA) reaction, and this terminology has since come into more widespread use. Since 2012, the HDDA reaction has been an area of renewed interest and has attracted further study by a number of research groups.

== Reaction scope ==
One of the main advantages of the HDDA reaction over other methods of accessing benzynes is the simplicity of the reaction system. HDDA reaction of triynes or tetraynes forms benzynes without the direct formation of by-products. In comparison, the formation of benzyne through removal of ortho-substituents on arenes results in stoichiometric amounts of byproducts from those substituents. For example, formation of benzyne from 1 mole of 2-trimethylsilylphenyl trifluoromethanesulfonate (triflate) produces 1 mole of trimethylsilyl fluoride and 1 mole of triflate ion. Byproducts can compete with other reagents for benzyne trapping, cause side-reactions, and may require additional purification.

Additionally, the HDDA reaction can be useful for substrates with sensitive functionality that might not be tolerated by other benzyne formation conditions (e.g. strong base). The thermally-initiated HDDA reaction has been shown to tolerate esters, ketones, protected amides, ethers, protected amines, aryl halides, alkyl halides, alkenes, and cyclopropanes.

=== Green chemistry ===
The HDDA reaction can fulfill several principles of green chemistry.

- Atom economy – All of the atoms in the HDDA substrate remain in the product after the reaction and atoms of the trapping reagent are incorporated into the product.
- Reduced waste – Formation of the benzyne species produces no stoichiometric byproducts. Products are often formed in high yield with few side-products.
- Catalysis – HDDA reaction occurs thermally or with a sub-stoichiometric amount of catalyst.

== Synthetic applications ==
=== Intramolecular trapping ===
The HDDA reaction can be used to synthesize multi-cyclic ring systems from linear precursors containing the diyne, diynophile, and the trapping group. For example, Hoye and co-workers were able to synthesize fused, tricyclic ring systems from linear triyne precursors in one step and high yields via a thermally-initiated, intramolecular HDDA reaction. Furthermore, both nitrogen- and oxygen-containing heterocycles could be incorporated by use of an appropriate precursor. In this case, the pendant silyl ether provided the trapping group, through a retro-Brook rearrangement.

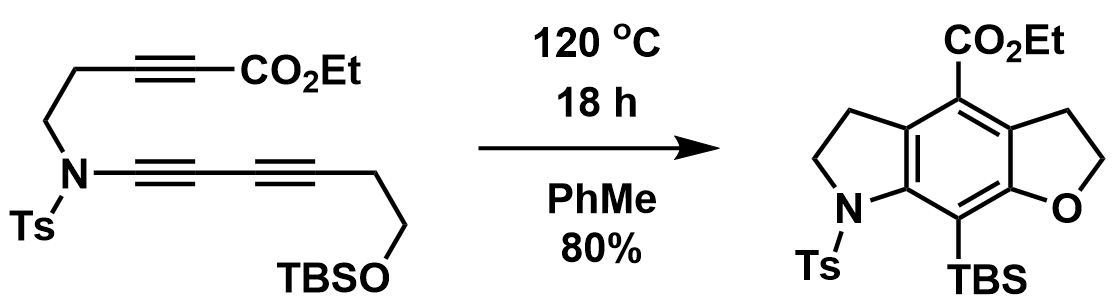
HDDA figure 3 - Heterocycle

=== Intermolecular trapping ===
HDDA-generated benzynes can also be trapped intermolecularly by a variety of trapping reagents. Careful choice of trapping reagent can add further functionality, including aryl halides, aryl heteroatoms (phenols and aniline derivatives), and multiple ring systems.

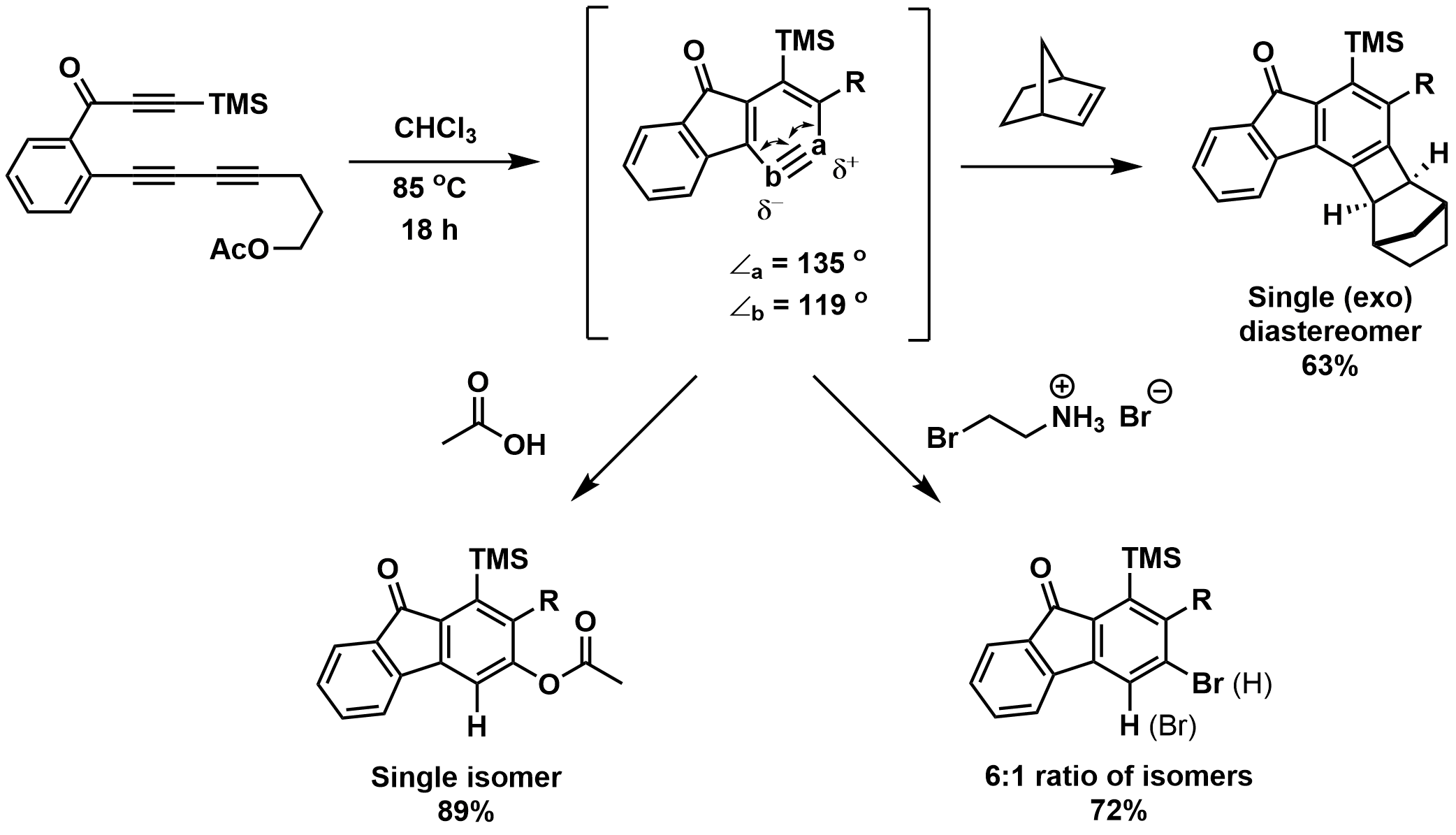
HDDA figure - Intermolecular trapping

=== Ene reactions ===
The HDDA reaction can be used in a cascade reaction sequence with ene reactions, such as the Alder ene reaction and the aromatic ene reaction. The HDDA-generated benzyne can be trapped with a suitable ene donor that is covalently tethered to the benzyne. The benzyne serves as the enophile, while the ene can be an alkene (Alder ene) or an aromatic ring (aromatic ene). Lee and co-workers have shown an HDDA-Alder ene cascade reaction that can produce a variety of products, including medium-sized fused rings, spirocycles, and allenes.

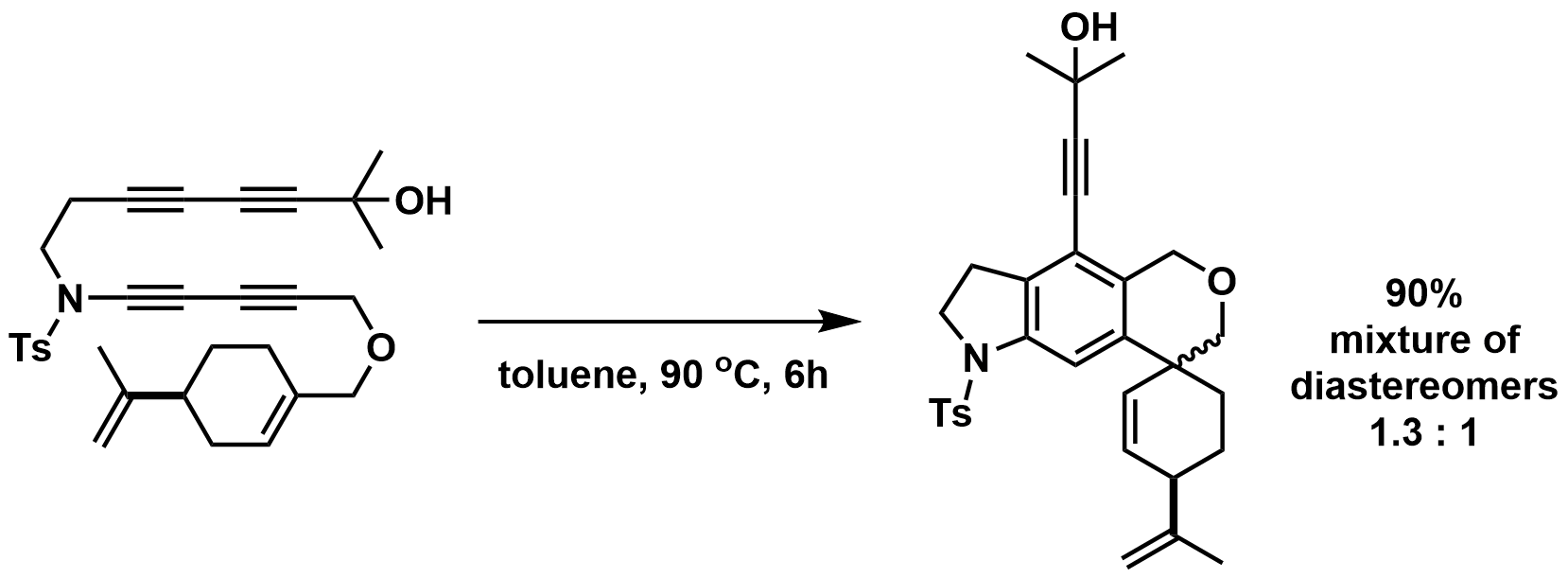
HDDA figure - alder-ene

Hoye and co-workers demonstrated a thermally-initiated triple HDDA-aromatic ene-Alder ene cascade that leads to heavily functionalized products in one-step with no additional reagents or by-products.

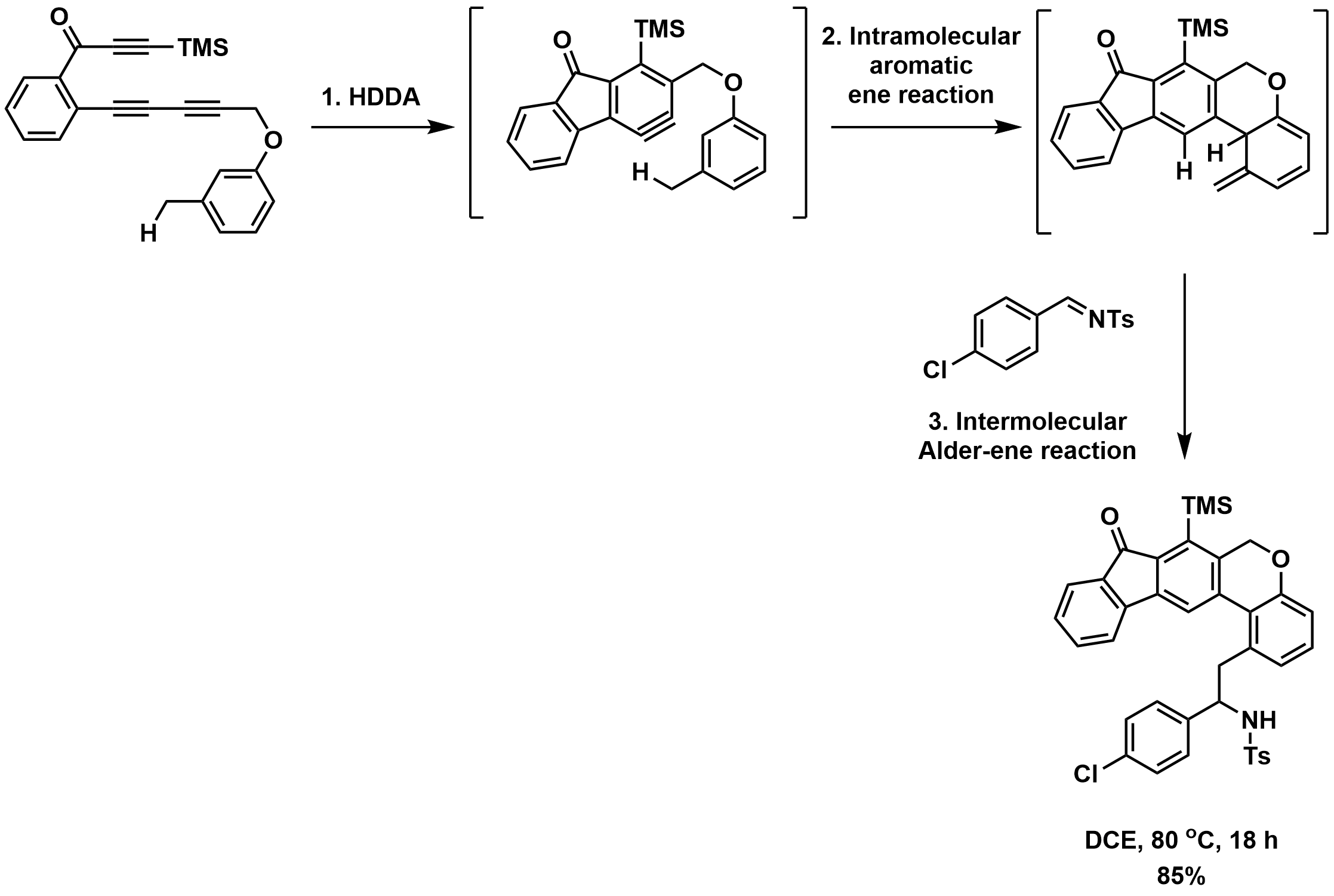
HDDA figure - aromatic ene

=== Dehydrogenation ===
HDDA-derived benzynes have also been shown to dehydrogenate saturated alkanes to form alkenes. In the absence of external trapping reagents, the benzyne intermediate can abstract vicinal (chemistry) hydrogen atoms from a suitable donor, often the reaction solvent (such as tetrahydrofuran or cyclooctane). This desaturates the donor alkane, forming an alkene, and traps the benzyne to a dihydrobenzenoid product. Isotopic labelling and computational studies suggest that the double hydrogen transfer mechanism occurs by a concerted pathway and that the rate of reaction is highly dependent on the conformation of the alkane donor. This reaction can be used to access 1,2,3,4-tetrasubstituted aromatic rings, a substitution pattern that can be difficult to access through other synthetic methodology.

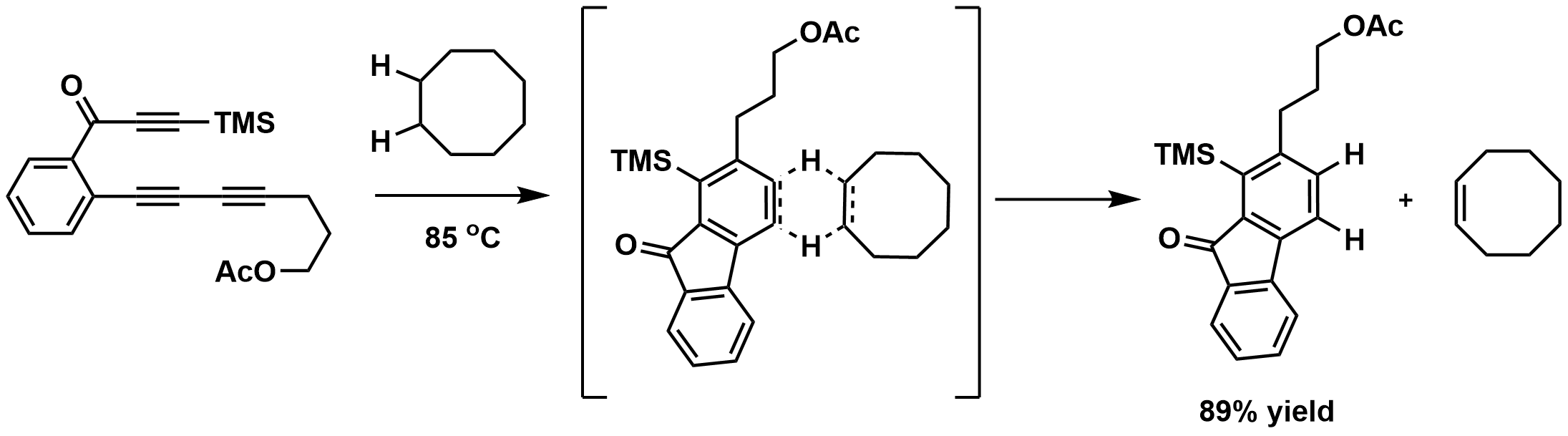
HDDA figure - Dehydrogenation

=== C-H activation ===
The HDDA reaction can also be used as a method of C-H activation, where a pendant alkane C-H bond traps a metal-complexed aryne intermediate. Lee and co-workers observed that transition metal catalysts induced an HDDA reaction of tetraynes that was intramolecularly trapped by a pendant, sp^{3} C-H bond. Primary, secondary, and tertiary C-H bonds were all reactive trapping partners, with silver salts being the most effective catalysts. Deuterium labelling experiments suggest that the (sp^{3}) C-H bond breaking and (sp^{2}) C-H bond forming reactions occur in a concerted fashion.

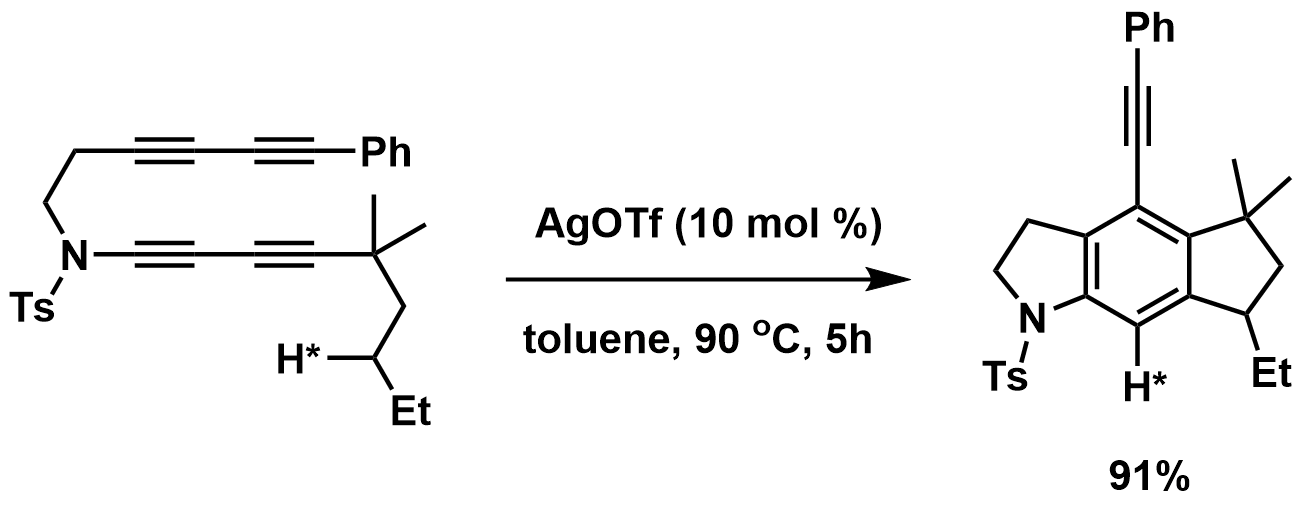
HDDA figure - C-H activation

=== Fluorination ===
The silver-catalyzed HDDA reaction has also been used to synthesize organofluorine compounds by use of a fluorine-containing counterion. The metal-complexed aryne intermediate can be trapped by the counterion to produce aryl rings with fluoro, trifluoromethyl, or trifluoromethylthiol substituents. Unstable counterions, such as CF_{3}^{−}, can be produced in-situ.

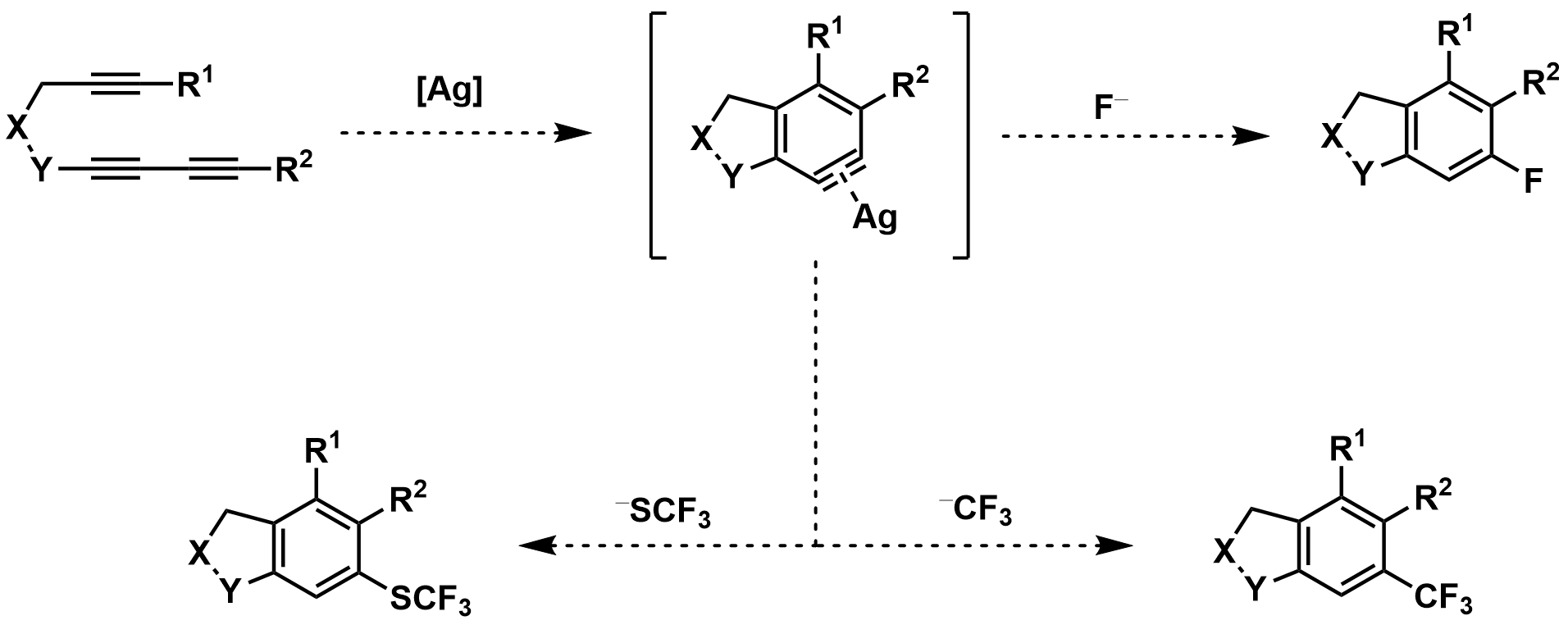
HDDA figure - fluorination

=== The domino HDDA reaction ===
Properly designed polyyne substrate has been shown to undergo efficient cascade net [4+2] cycloadditions merely upon being heated. This domino hexadehydro Diels–Alder reaction is initiated by a rate-limiting benzyne formation. Proceeding through naphthyne, anthracyne, and/or tetracyne intermediates, rapid bottom-up synthesis of highly fused, polycyclic aromatic compounds results.

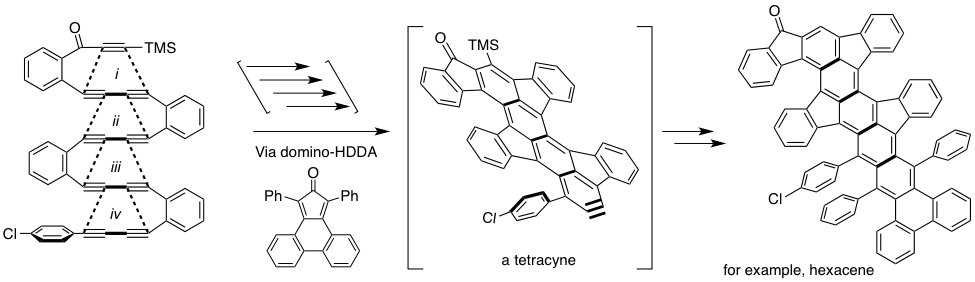

=== The aza HDDA reaction ===
Nitriles can also participate in the HDDA reactions to generate pyridyne intermediates. In situ capturing of pyridines gives rise to highly substituted and functionalized pyridine derivatives, which is complementary to other classical approaches for construction of this important class of heterocycles.

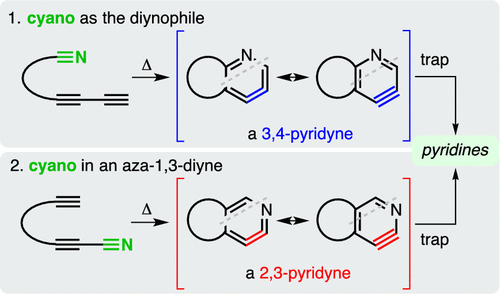

=== Radial HDDA reactions ===
Designer multi-ynes arrayed upon a common, central template undergo sequential, multiple cycloisomerization reactions to produce architecturally novel polycyclic compounds in a single operation. Diverse product topologies are accessible, ranging from highly fused, polycyclic aromatic compounds (PACs) to architectures having structurally complex arms adorning central phenylene or expanded phenylene cores.

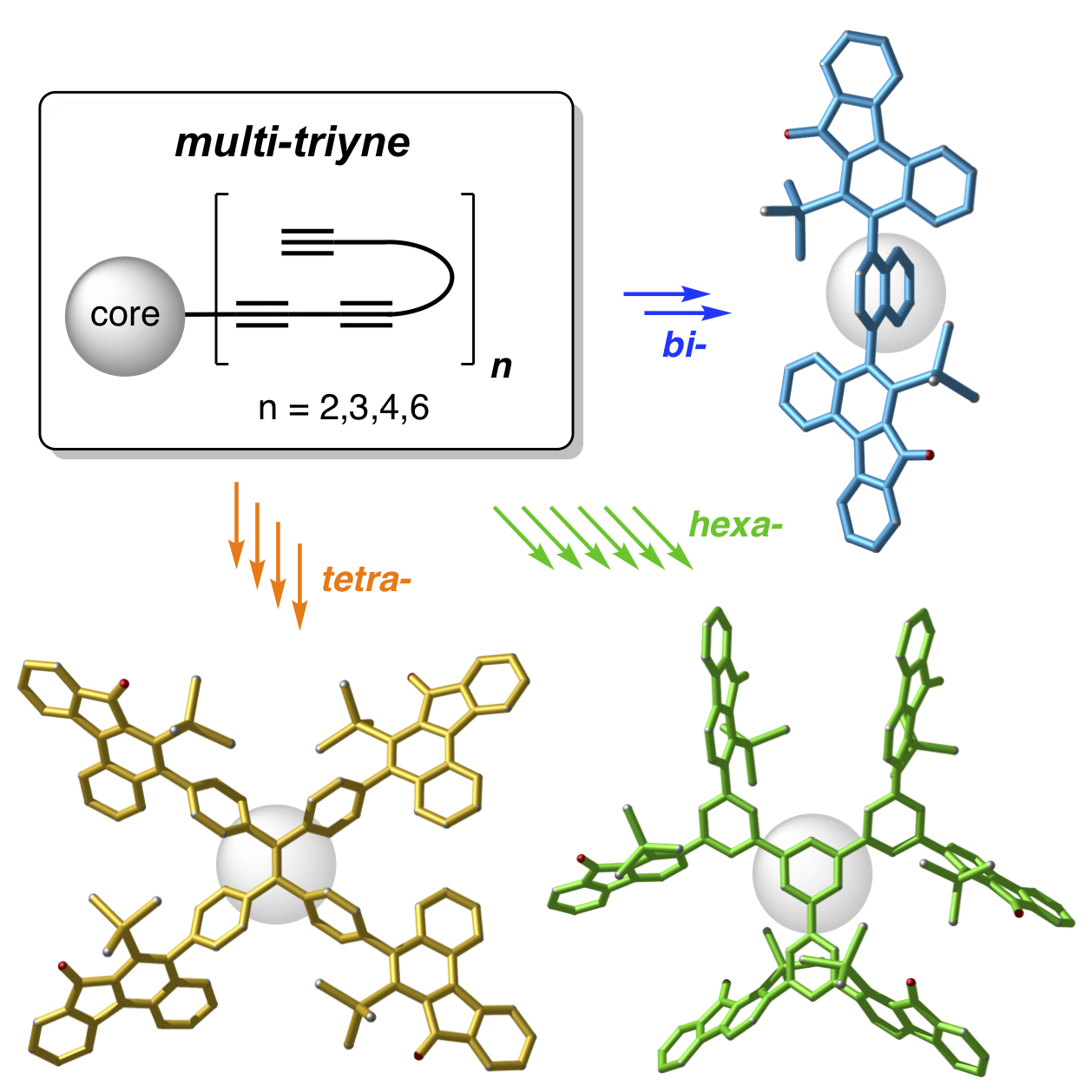
