= Transition metal benzyne complex =

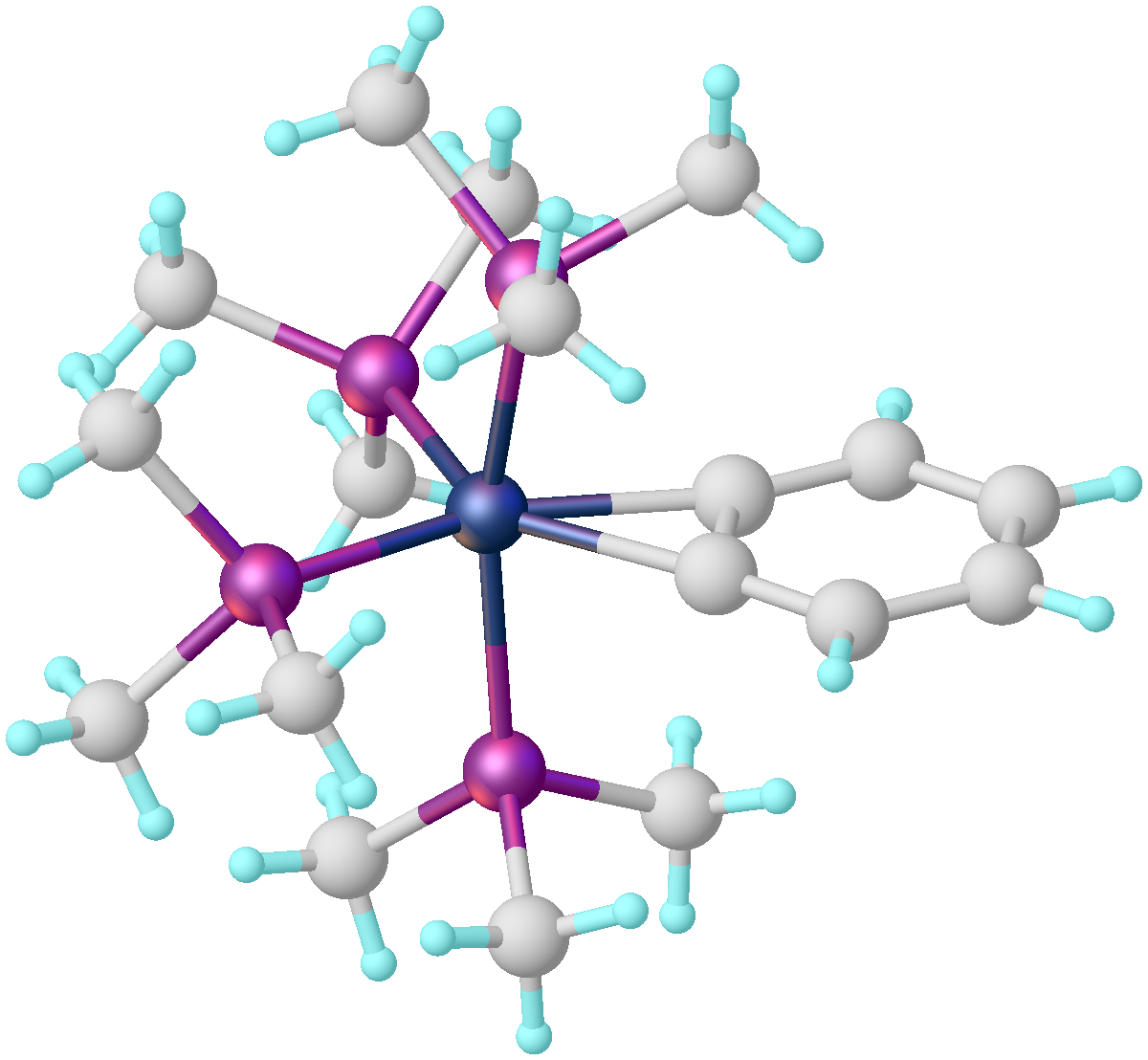
Structure of Ru(C_{6}H_{4})(PMe_{3})_{4}.

Transition metal benzyne complexes are organometallic complexes that contain benzyne ligands (C_{6}H_{4}). Unlike benzyne itself, these complexes are less reactive although they undergo a number of insertion reactions.

== Examples ==
The studies of metal-benzyne complexes were initiated with the preparation of zirconocene complex by reaction diphenylzirconocene with trimethylphosphine.

Cp_{2}ZrPh_{2} + PMe_{3} → Cp_{2}Zr(C_{6}H_{4})(PMe_{3}) + PhH

The preparation of Ta(η^{5}-C_{5}Me_{5})(C_{6}H_{4})Me_{2} proceeds similarly, requiring the phenyl complex Ta(η^{5}-C_{5}Me_{5})(C_{6}H_{5})Me_{3}. This complex is prepared by treatment of Ta(η^{5}-C_{5}Me_{5})Me_{3}Cl with phenyllithium. Upon heating, this complex eliminates methane, leaving the benzyne complex:

Ta(η^{5}-C_{5}Me_{5})(C_{6}H_{5})Me_{3} → Ta(η^{5}-C_{5}Me_{5})(C_{6}H_{4})Me_{2} + CH_{4}

The second example of a benzyne complex is Ni(η^{2}-C_{6}H_{4})(dcpe) (dcpe = Cy_{2}PCH_{2}CH_{2}PCy_{2}). It is produced by dehalogenation of the bromophenyl complex NiCl(C_{6}H_{4}Br-2)(dcpe) with sodium amalgam. Its coordination geometry is close to trigonal planar.

== Reactivity ==
Benzyne complexes react with a variety of electrophiles, resulting in insertion into one M-C bond. With trifluoroacetic acid, benzene is lost to give the trifluoroacetate Ni(O_{2}CF_{3})_{2}(dcpe).

== Structural trends ==
Several benzyne complexes have been examined by X-ray crystallography.

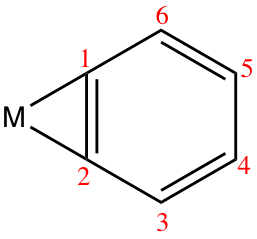
Labeled carbon atoms corresponding to bonds with lengths given in table.

Bond lengths (Å) in Ta, Ni and Zr benzyne complexes
Bond	Ta	Ni	Zr
M-C_{1}	2.059	1.868	2.267
M-C_{2}	2.091	1.870	2.228
C_{1}-C_{2}	1.364	1.332	1.364
C_{2}-C_{3}	1.410	1.389	1.389
C_{3}-C_{4}	1.362	1.383	1.383
C_{4}-C_{5}	1.403	0.93	1.380
C_{5}-C_{6}	1.375	1.383	1.377
C_{6}-C_{1}	1.408	1.386	1.406

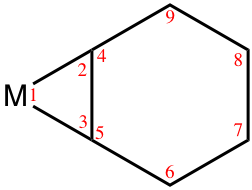
Labeled bond angles that are given in table

Bond angles (degrees) in Ni and Zr benzyne complexes
Angle	Ni	Zr
1	41.9	35.3
2	69.2	70.8
3	69.1	73.9
4	122.9	120.2
5	122.3	122.1
6	116.1	(n/a)
7	121.5	(n/a)
8	121.0	(n/a)
9	116.2	(n/a)
