= D-glycero-alpha-D-manno-heptose 1-phosphate guanylyltransferase =

Identifiers
- EC no.: 2.7.7.71

Databases
- BRENDA: enzyme data
- ExPASy: NiceZyme view
- KEGG: enzyme entry
- MetaCyc: metabolic pathway
- Rhea: reactions
- PDB structures: RCSB PDB PDBe PDBsum
Search
- PMC: articles
- PubMed: articles
- NCBI: proteins

D-glycero-alpha-D-manno-heptose 1-phosphate guanylyltransferase (EC 2.7.7.71, hddC (gene), gmhD (gene)) is an enzyme with systematic name GTP:D-glycero-alpha-D-manno-heptose 1-phosphate guanylyltransferase. It catalyses the following chemical reaction

D-glycero-α-D-manno-heptose 1-phosphate
+ GTP
PP_{i}
GDP-D-glycero-α-D-manno-heptose

The enzyme characterised from Aneurinibacillus thermoaerophilus transfers a guanosine phosphate group from guanosine triphosphate (GTP) to a specific heptose sugar, D-glycero-β-D-manno-heptose 1-phosphate, giving the guanosine diphosphate derivative, GDP-D-glycero-β-D-manno-heptose. The glycoproteins in this bacterium contain this specific sugar unit.
