= D-glycero-beta-D-manno-heptose-7-phosphate kinase =

Identifiers
- EC no.: 2.7.1.167

Databases
- IntEnz: IntEnz view
- BRENDA: BRENDA entry
- ExPASy: NiceZyme view
- KEGG: KEGG entry
- MetaCyc: metabolic pathway
- PRIAM: profile
- PDB structures: RCSB PDB PDBe PDBsum
Search
- PMC: articles
- PubMed: articles
- NCBI: proteins

D-glycero-beta-D-manno-heptose-7-phosphate kinase (EC 2.7.1.167, heptose 7-phosphate kinase, D-beta-D-heptose 7-phosphotransferase, D-beta-D-heptose-7-phosphate kinase, HldE1 heptokinase, glycero-manno-heptose 7-phosphate kinase, D-beta-D-heptose 7-phosphate kinase/D-beta-D-heptose 1-phosphate adenylyltransferase, hldE (gene), rfaE (gene)) is an enzyme with systematic name ATP:D-glycero-beta-D-manno-heptose 7-phosphate 1-phosphotransferase. It catalyses the following chemical reaction

ATP +
D-glycero-β-D-manno-heptose 7-phosphate
ADP +
D-glycero-β-D-manno-heptose 1,7-bisphosphate

The enzyme characterised from Salmonella typhimurium converts D-glycero-β-D-manno-heptose 7-phosphate to D-glycero-β-D-manno-heptose 1,7-bisphosphate by transferring a phosphate group from the cofactor, adenosine triphosphate (ATP), which is converted to adenosine diphosphate (ADP). It has also been found in Escherichia coli.

The bifunctional protein hldE catalyses this reaction and also one equivalent to D-glycero-beta-D-manno-heptose 1-phosphate adenylyltransferase.
