= D-glycero-beta-D-manno-heptose 1-phosphate adenylyltransferase =

Identifiers
- EC no.: 2.7.7.70

Databases
- IntEnz: IntEnz view
- BRENDA: BRENDA entry
- ExPASy: NiceZyme view
- KEGG: KEGG entry
- MetaCyc: metabolic pathway
- PRIAM: profile
- PDB structures: RCSB PDB PDBe PDBsum
Search
- PMC: articles
- PubMed: articles
- NCBI: proteins

D-glycero-beta-D-manno-heptose 1-phosphate adenylyltransferase (EC 2.7.7.70, D-beta-D-heptose 7-phosphate kinase/D-beta-D-heptose 1-phosphate adenylyltransferase, D-glycero-D-manno-heptose-1beta-phosphate adenylyltransferase, hldE (gene), rfaE (gene)) is an enzyme with systematic name ATP:D-glycero-beta-D-manno-heptose 1-phosphate adenylyltransferase. It catalyses the following chemical reaction

D-glycero-β-D-manno-heptose 1-phosphate
+ ATP
PP_{i}
ADP-D-glycero-β-D-manno-heptose

The enzyme characterised from Escherichia coli transfers an adenylyl group from adenosine triphosphate (ATP) to a specific heptose sugar, D-glycero-β-D-manno-heptose 1-phosphate, giving the adenosine diphosphate derivative, ADP-D-glycero-β-D-manno-heptose.

The product is subsequently converted to ADP-L-glycero-β-D-manno-heptose by the enzyme ADP-glyceromanno-heptose 6-epimerase. This material is used by bacteria to make glycoproteins and polysaccharides.
