= Hygromycin =

Hygromycin may refer to either of two chemically dissimilar antibiotics produced by the bacterium Streptomyces hygroscopicus:

- Hygromycin A
- Hygromycin B, an aminoglycoside that kills bacteria, fungi and higher eukaryotic cells
