= Tryptophan 2-C-methyltransferase =

Identifiers
- EC no.: 2.1.1.106
- CAS no.: 126626-83-3

Databases
- IntEnz: IntEnz view
- BRENDA: BRENDA entry
- ExPASy: NiceZyme view
- KEGG: KEGG entry
- MetaCyc: metabolic pathway
- PRIAM: profile
- PDB structures: RCSB PDB PDBe PDBsum
- Gene Ontology: AmiGO / QuickGO
Search
- PMC: articles
- PubMed: articles
- NCBI: proteins

Tryptophan 2-C-methyltransferase (EC 2.1.1.106) is an enzyme that catalyzes the chemical reaction

tryptophan
+ SAM
2-methyl-L-tryptophan
+ SAH

This is a methylation reaction in which the natural amino acid, L-tryptophan, is converted to 2-methyl-L-tryptophan. The methyl group comes from the cofactor, S-adenosyl methionine (SAM), which becomes S-adenosyl-L-homocysteine (SAH). The enzyme characterised from Streptomyces laurentii is part of the biosynthetic pathway to thiostrepton.

This enzyme belongs to the family of transferases, specifically those transferring one-carbon group methyltransferases. The systematic name of this enzyme class is S-adenosyl-L-methionine:L-tryptophan 2-C-methyltransferase. Other names in common use include tryptophan 2-methyltransferase, and S-adenosylmethionine:tryptophan 2-methyltransferase.
