= Alpha,alpha-trehalose-phosphate synthase =

Alpha,alpha-trehalose-phosphate synthase may refer to the following:

- Alpha,alpha-trehalose-phosphate synthase (GDP-forming)
- Alpha,alpha-trehalose-phosphate synthase (UDP-forming)
