= Streptomyces milbemycinicus =

Scientific classification
- Domain: Bacteria
- Kingdom: Bacillati
- Phylum: Actinomycetota
- Class: Actinomycetes
- Order: Streptomycetales
- Family: Streptomycetaceae
- Genus: Streptomyces
- Species: S. milbemycinicus

Binomial name
- Streptomyces milbemycinicus Kumar and Goodfellow 2010

Type strain
- DSM 41911, NRRL 5739

Species of bacterium

Streptomyces milbemycinicus is a bacterium species from the genus of Streptomyces which has been isolated from soil. Streptomyces milbemycinicus produces milbemycin.

== See also ==
- List of Streptomyces species
