= Streptomyces ascomycinicus =

Scientific classification
- Domain: Bacteria
- Kingdom: Bacillati
- Phylum: Actinomycetota
- Class: Actinomycetes
- Order: Streptomycetales
- Family: Streptomycetaceae
- Genus: Streptomyces
- Species: S. ascomycinicus

Binomial name
- Streptomyces ascomycinicus Kumar and Goodfellow 2010

Type strain
- Arai KK 317, AS 4.1388, ATCC 14891, BCRC 11823, BL-504, CCRC 11823, CECT 3139, CGMCC 4.1388, CGMCC AS 4.1388, CIP 106837, DSM 40822, HUT-6598, IFM 1253, IFO 13981, JCM 4964, KCC S-0964, KK 317, Lanoot R-8771, LMG 19398, MA 6475, NBRC 13981, R-8771, A-9814, Tresner BL-504

Species of bacterium

Streptomyces ascomycinicus is a bacterium species from the genus Streptomyces which has been isolated from soil from Kobe City in Japan. Streptomyces ascomycinicus produces ascomycin.

== See also ==
- List of Streptomyces species
