= Nocathiacin I =

Names
- IUPAC name N-(3-Amino-3-oxoprop-1-en-2-yl)-2-[(21E)-30-[5-(dimethylamino)-4-hydroxy-4,6-dimethyloxan-2-yl]oxy-9,52-dihydroxy-18-(1-hydroxyethyl)-21-(1-methoxyethylidene)-16,19,26,31,42,46-hexaoxo-32,43,54-trioxa-3,13,23,49-tetrathia-7,17,20,27,45,51,52,55,56,57-decazadecacyclo[26.16.6.229,40.12,5.112,15.122,25.138,41.147,50.06,11.034,39]heptapentaconta-2(57),4,6,8,10,12(56),14,22(55),24,34(39),35,37,40,47,50-pentadecaen-8-yl]-1,3-thiazole-4-carboxamide

Identifiers
CAS Number	214044-52-7
3D model (JSmol)	Interactive image
ChEMBL	ChEMBL506971
ChemSpider	10190178
PubChem CID	16135631
- InChI: InChI=1S/C61H60N14O18S5/c1-22(48(62)78)63-49(79)31-19-97-57(68-31)42-36(77)12-27-41(70-42)30-17-95-55(65-30)29-16-91-59(84)44-28-15-89-45(46(93-37-13-61(5,86)47(74(6)7)25(4)92-37)60(85)90-14-26-10-9-11-35(38(26)28)75(44)87)43(58-69-32(20-98-58)50(80)64-29)73-52(82)34-21-96-56(67-34)40(24(3)88-8)72-53(83)39(23(2)76)71-51(81)33-18-94-54(27)66-33/h9-12,17-21,23,25,29,37,39,43,45-47,76-77,86-87H,1,13-16H2,2-8H3,(H2,62,78)(H,63,79)(H,64,80)(H,71,81)(H,72,83)(H,73,82)/b40-24+ Key: FFLJEMWVYVKPDW-BKATUZMVSA-N
- SMILES: CC1C(C(CC(O1)OC2C3C4C5=NC(=CS5)C(=O)NC(COC(=O)C6=C(CO3)C7=C(COC2=O)C=CC=C7N6O)C8=NC(=CS8)C9=NC(=C(C=C9C1=NC(=CS1)C(=O)NC(C(=O)N/C(=C(\C)/OC)/C1=NC(=CS1)C(=O)N4)C(C)O)O)C1=NC(=CS1)C(=O)NC(=C)C(=O)N)(C)O)N(C)C
- Except where otherwise noted, data are given for materials in their standard state (at 25 °C [77 °F], 100 kPa). Infobox references

Nocathiacin I is an antibiotic peptide of the thiopeptide class. It is a fermentation product isolated from Nocardia sp.

== See also ==
- Nosiheptide
