= Streptomyces crystallinus =

Scientific classification
- Domain: Bacteria
- Kingdom: Bacillati
- Phylum: Actinomycetota
- Class: Actinomycetes
- Order: Streptomycetales
- Family: Streptomycetaceae
- Genus: Streptomyces
- Species: S. crystallinus

Binomial name
- Streptomyces crystallinus Tresner et al. 1961

Type strain
- AS 4.16, CGMCC 4.1600, DSM 40945, IFO 15401, JCM 5067, KCC S-1067, KCCS-1067, KCTC 9717, Lederle LabsT-1384, MS1483, NBRC 15401, NCIMB 12860, NRRL B-3629

Species of bacterium

Streptomyces crystallinus is a bacterial species from the genus Streptomyces. Streptomyces crystallinus produces hygromycin A.

== See also ==
- List of Streptomyces species
