= Nosiheptide =

Names
- IUPAC name N-(3-Amino-3-oxoprop-1-en-2-yl)-2-[(21Z)-21-ethylidene-9,30-dihydroxy-18-(1-hydroxyethyl)-40-methyl-16,19,26,31,42,46-hexaoxo-32-oxa-3,13,23,43,49-pentathia-7,17,20,27,45,51,52,53,54,55-decazanonacyclo[26.16.6.1^{2,5}.1^{12,15}.1^{22,25}.1^{38,41}.1^{47,50}.0^{6,11}.0^{34,39}]pentapentaconta-2(55),4,6,8,10,12(54),14,22(53),24,34(39),35,37,40,47,50-pentadecaen-8-yl]-1,3-thiazole-4-carboxamide

Identifiers
CAS Number	56377-79-8
3D model (JSmol)	Interactive image
ChEMBL	ChEMBL2103750
ChemSpider	32699560
ECHA InfoCard	100.054.654
EC Number	260-138-4
PubChem CID	16129696
UNII	F7YI574GFD
- InChI: InChI=1S/C51H43N13O12S6/c1-5-23-46-60-28(14-79-46)41(70)56-25-10-33(67)50(74)76-11-21-7-6-8-24-34(21)18(2)35(54-24)51(75)82-17-31(57-42(71)29-15-80-47(25)61-29)48-58-26(12-78-48)37-22(45-59-30(13-77-45)43(72)64-36(20(4)65)44(73)55-23)9-32(66)38(63-37)49-62-27(16-81-49)40(69)53-19(3)39(52)68/h5-9,12-16,20,25,31,33,36,54,65-67H,3,10-11,17H2,1-2,4H3,(H2,52,68)(H,53,69)(H,55,73)(H,56,70)(H,57,71)(H,64,72)/b23-5- Key: OQAOHXRUMXWDLQ-FPQMYIDKSA-N
- SMILES: C/C=C/1\c2nc(cs2)C(=O)N[C@H]3C[C@@H](C(=O)OCc4cccc5c4c(c([nH]5)C(=O)SC[C@@H](c6nc(cs6)-c7c(cc(c(n7)c8nc(cs8)C(=O)NC(=C)C(=O)N)O)-c9nc(cs9)C(=O)N[C@H](C(=O)N1)[C@H](C)O)NC(=O)c1csc3n1)C)O

Properties
Chemical formula	C_{51}H_{43}N_{13}O_{12}S_{6}
Molar mass	1222.34 g·mol^{−1}
- Except where otherwise noted, data are given for materials in their standard state (at 25 °C [77 °F], 100 kPa). Infobox references

Nosiheptide is a thiopeptide antibiotic produced by the bacterium Streptomyces actuosus.

== Chemical classification ==
Nosiheptide is classified, along with several others, as an e series thiopeptide characterized by a nitrogen containing, 6-membered heterocycle in a 2,3,5,6 substituted fashion central to multiple azoles (or azolines) and dehydroamino acids along with a macrocyclic core. Nosiheptide is constructed solely of proteinogenic amino acids and has ribosomal origin, making it a member of the ribosomally synthesized and posttranslationally modified peptide family of natural products. Thiopeptides such as nosiheptide have potent activity against various bacterial pathogens, primarily gram positive, including methicillin-resistant Staphylococcus aureus, penicillin-resistant Streptococcus pneumoniae, and vancomycin-resistant enterococci.

== Composition ==
Nosiheptide consists of 5 thiazole rings, a central tetrasubstituted pyridine moiety, and a bicyclic macrocycle, which includes a modified amino acid (from tryptophan) external to the initial peptide translated from the gene encoding it. It is used as a feed additive in the growth of poultry and hogs to promote growth and general health, although it has not been applied in human medicines due to low water solubility and poor resorption from the gastrointestinal tract. Nosiheptide and other thiopeptide's mechanism of action stems from the tight binding on the 50S ribosomal subunit and inhibiting the activities of elongation factors, preventing protein synthesis.

== Biosynthesis ==
Nosiheptide precursor peptide including 37 amino acid leader peptide and 13 amino acid structural peptide (shown).

All moieties of the peptidyl backbone of nosiheptide were shown to originate exclusively from proteinogenic amino acids. The structural motifs include dehydroamino acids from the serine or threonine residues undergoing anti elimination of water, thiazoles from cysteine residues with cyclodehydration followed by deoxygenation, and the central hydroxypyridine produced by cyclization between two dehydroalanine acids with incorporation of an adjacent carbonyl group.

Thiazole formation.

Nosiheptide biosynthesis begins with the translation of a 50 amino acid precursor peptide consisting of a 37 amino acid leader peptide fused to a 13 amino acid structural peptide (SCTTCECCCSCSS), matching the nosiheptide backbone aside from the C-terminal serine residue that is partially cleaved in maturation of the final product. Next, cyclizations occur between 5 of the cysteine residues in the structural sequence and the previous carbonyl on the adjacent amino acid to form thiazole rings after oxidation. Several amino acid residues then undergo elimination of water to produce dehydroamino acids, and the first macrocycle is constructed by cyclization of two of these dehydroamino acid residues. This cyclization includes a Diels-Alder type reaction, dehydration, and elimination of the leader peptide. An indolic acid moiety modified from L-tryptophan is then ligated to the unmodified cysteine residue through a thioester linkage. After methylation and oxidation of the indole, the second macrocycle is formed by reaction of the indole hydroxyl group with the free carboxyl group of the nearby glutamate residue. The now fused bicyclic peptide undergoes several oxidations and partial cleavage of the C-terminal dehydroalanine residue to give the mature nosiheptide.

Amino acid dehydration of residues in nosiheptide

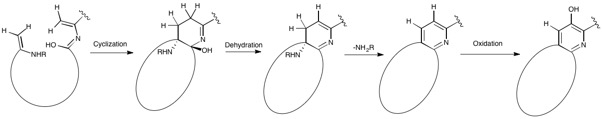
Nosiheptide intermediate diels-alder type cyclization and aromatization

The translation and modification of the precursor peptide is undertaken by several enzymes encoded in a localized gene cluster containing 14 structural genes and 1 regulatory gene. One of these genes encodes the peptide, and the others are responsible for the posttranslational modifications.

== Total synthesis ==
The first total synthesis was published by Wojtas et al. in 2016. It was achieved through the assembly of a fully functionalized linear precursor followed by consecutive macrocyclizations. Key features are a critical macrothiolactonization and a mild deprotection strategy for the 3-hydroxypyridine core. The natural product was identical to isolated authentic material in terms of spectral data and antibiotic activity.

== See also ==
- Nocathiacin I
