= Streptomyces actuosus =

Scientific classification
- Domain: Bacteria
- Kingdom: Bacillati
- Phylum: Actinomycetota
- Class: Actinomycetes
- Order: Streptomycetales
- Family: Streptomycetaceae
- Genus: Streptomyces
- Species: S. actuosus

Binomial name
- Streptomyces actuosus Pinnert et al.

Species of bacterium

Streptomyces actuosus is a bacterium species from the genus of Streptomyces. Streptomyces actuosus produces nosiheptide and staurosporin.

== See also ==
- List of Streptomyces species
