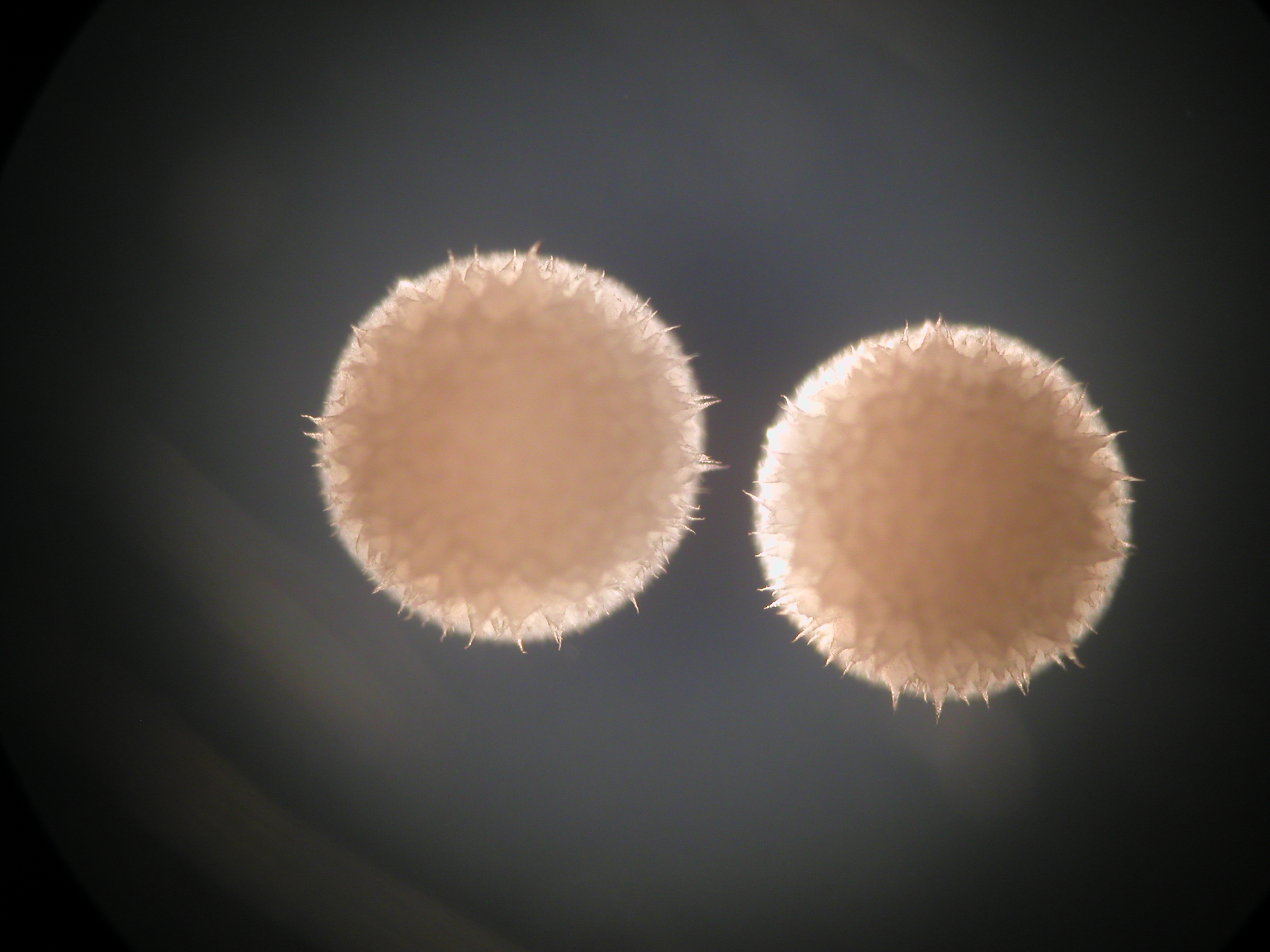
- Streptomyces hygroscopicus colonies

Scientific classification
- Domain: Bacteria
- Kingdom: Bacillati
- Phylum: Actinomycetota
- Class: Actinomycetes
- Order: Streptomycetales
- Family: Streptomycetaceae
- Genus: Streptomyces
- Species: S. hygroscopicus

Binomial name
- Streptomyces hygroscopicus (Jensen, 1931) Yüntsen et al., 1956

Subspecies
- subsp. "aureolacrimosus" Takiguchi et al., 1980; subsp. hygroscopicus (Jensen 1931) Yüntsen et al., 1956 (Approved Lists 1980); subsp. ossamyceticus Schmitz et al., 1965 (Approved Lists 1980); subsp. "yakushimaensis" Hatanaka et al., 1988

Synonyms
- "Actinomyces hygroscopicus" Jensen, 1931; Streptomyces endus Anderson and Gottlieb, 1952 (Approved Lists 1980); Streptomyces sporocinereus (ex Krassilnikov, 1970) Preobrazhenskaya, 1986

= Streptomyces hygroscopicus =

Species of bacterium

Streptomyces hygroscopicus is a bacterial species in the genus Streptomyces. It was first described by Hans Laurits Jensen in 1931.

== Biochemistry ==
Cultures of different strains of S. hygroscopicus can be used to produce several chemical compounds or enzymes.

=== Small molecules ===
==== Immunosuppressants ====
Sirolimus (also known as rapamycin) is an antifungal and immunosuppressant that has been isolated from S. hygroscopicus from soil samples from Easter Island. Ascomycin is another immunosuppressant produced by some strains of S. hygroscopicus; it has a similar structure to sirolimus and can be used to treat autoimmune diseases and skin diseases and can help prevent rejection after an organ transplant.

==== Antibiotics ====
The antibiotics geldanamycin, hygromycin B, nigericin, validamycin, clethramycin, and cyclothiazomycin are found in S. hygroscopicus. Clethramycin shows antifungal activity against the fungi Aspergillus, Candida, and Cryptococcus.The biosynthesis of clethramycin gene cluster was identified in Streptomyces mediocidicus strain ATCC23936.

==== Experimental cancer drugs ====
Indolocarbazoles can be found in S. hygroscopicus .

==== Anthelmintics and insecticides ====
Milbemycin and milbemycin oxime can be found in S. hygroscopicus cultures.

==== Herbicide ====
S. hygroscopicus also produces the natural herbicide bialaphos.

=== Enzymes ===
The enzymes alpha,alpha-trehalose-phosphate synthase (GDP-forming), carboxyvinyl-carboxyphosphonate phosphorylmutase, and hygromycin-B kinase can be isolated from cultures of S. hygroscopicus.
