= Pimecrolimus =

Immunosuppressive drug

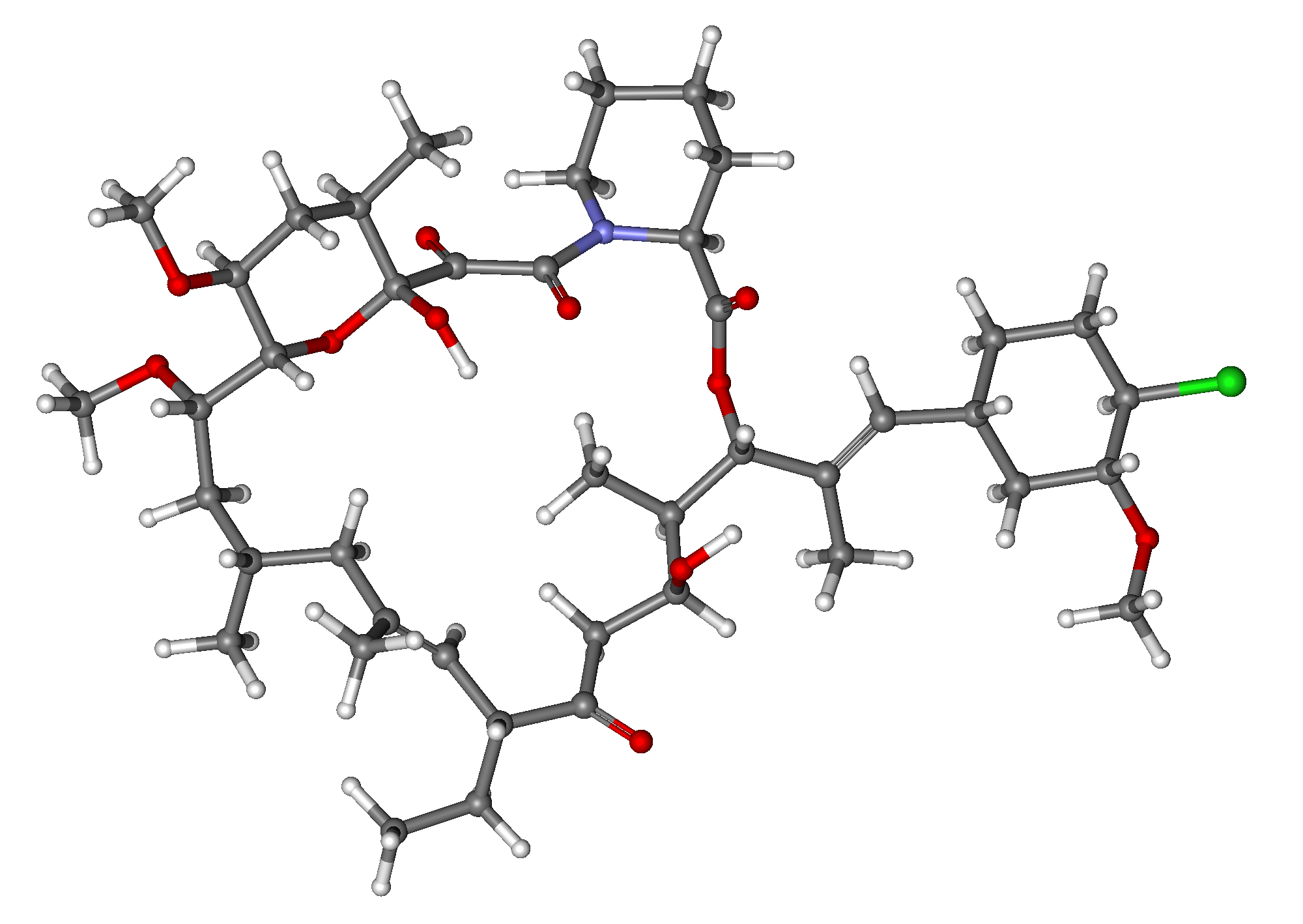

Clinical data
- Trade names: Elidel
- AHFS/Drugs.com: Monograph
- Pregnancy category: AU: B3
- Routes of administration: topical
- Drug class: immunosuppressant
- ATC code: D11AH02 (WHO)

Legal status
- Legal status: US: ℞-only

Pharmacokinetic data
- Bioavailability: low systemic absorption
- Protein binding: 74%–87%
- Metabolism: Hepatic CYP3A

Identifiers
- IUPAC name: (3S,4R,5S,8R,9E,12S,14S,15R,16S,18R,19R,26aS)-3-{(E)-2-[(1R,3R,4S)-4-chloro-3-methoxycyclohexyl]-1-methylvinyl}-8-ethyl-5,6,8,11,12,13,14,15,16,17,18,19,24,25,26,26a-hexadecahydro-5,19-dihydroxy-14,16-dimethoxy-4,10,12,18-tetramethyl-15,19-epoxy-3H-pyrido[2,1-c][1,4]oxaazacyclotricosin-1,7,20,21(4H,23H)-tetrone
- CAS Number: 137071-32-0
- PubChem CID: 16051947
- DrugBank: DB00337
- ChemSpider: 10482089
- UNII: 7KYV510875
- ChEMBL: ChEMBL1200686
- CompTox Dashboard (EPA): DTXSID2046674
- ECHA InfoCard: 100.124.895

Chemical and physical data
- Formula: C_{43}H_{68}ClNO_{11}
- Molar mass: 810.46 g·mol^{−1}
- 3D model (JSmol): Interactive image
- SMILES: Cl[C@@H]1CC[C@H](C[C@H]1OC)\C=C(/C)[C@H]2OC(=O)[C@@H]4CCCCN4C(=O)C(=O)[C@]3(O)O[C@H]([C@H](C[C@@H](C)CC(\C)=C\[C@@H](CC)C(=O)C[C@H](O)[C@H]2C)OC)[C@@H](OC)C[C@H]3C
- InChI: InChI=1S/C43H68ClNO11/c1-10-30-18-24(2)17-25(3)19-36(53-8)39-37(54-9)21-27(5)43(51,56-39)40(48)41(49)45-16-12-11-13-32(45)42(50)55-38(28(6)33(46)23-34(30)47)26(4)20-29-14-15-31(44)35(22-29)52-7/h18,20,25,27-33,35-39,46,51H,10-17,19,21-23H2,1-9H3/b24-18+,26-20+/t25-,27+,28+,29-,30+,31+,32-,33-,35+,36-,37-,38+,39+,43+/m0/s1; Key:KASDHRXLYQOAKZ-ZPSXYTITSA-N

Pimecrolimus is an immunosuppressant drug of the calcineurin inhibitor class used in the treatment of atopic dermatitis (eczema).

It is available as a topical cream. It was developed and formerly marketed by Novartis under the trade name Elidel.

== Medical uses ==
It has been proven to be effective in various inflammatory skin diseases, e.g., seborrheic dermatitis, cutaneous lupus erythematosus, oral lichen planus, vitiligo, and psoriasis. Tacrolimus and pimecrolimus are both calcineurin inhibitors and function as immunosuppressants.

=== Atopic dermatitis ===
If topical corticosteroids and moisturisers fail in the treatment of atopic dermatitis, short-term treatment with topical calcineurin inhibitors such as tacrolimus or pimecrolimus may be tried. Both tacrolimus and pimecrolimus are effective and safe to use in AD.

== Side effects ==
In January 2006, the United States Food and Drug Administration (FDA) announced that Elidel packaging would be required to carry a black box warning regarding the potential increased risk of lymph node or skin cancer, as for the similar drug tacrolimus, whereas current practice by UK dermatologists is not to consider this a significant real concern and they are increasingly recommending the use of such new drugs.

Importantly, although the FDA has approved updated black-box warning for tacrolimus and pimecrolimus, the recent report of the American Academy of Dermatology Association Task Force finds that there is no causal proof that topical immunomodulators cause lymphoma or nonmelanoma skin cancer, and systemic immunosuppression after short-term or intermittent long-term topical application seems an unlikely mechanism. Another recent review of evidence concluded that postmarketing surveillance shows no evidence for this systemic immunosuppression or increased risk for any malignancy.

A 2023 systematic review and meta-analysis published in The Lancet Child & Adolescent Health further concluded with moderate-certainty evidence that the two drugs were not associated with any increased risk of cancer. However, strong debates and controversies continue regarding the exact indications of immunomodulators and their duration of use in the absence of active controlled trials. Dermatologists' and allergists' professional societies, the American Academy of Dermatology, and the American Academy of Allergy, Asthma, and Immunology, have protested the inclusion of the black box warning. The AAAAI states "None of the information provided for the cases of lymphoma associated with the use of topical pimecrolimus or tacrolimus in AD indicate or suggest a causal relationship."

== Pharmacology ==
Pimecrolimus is an ascomycin macrolactam derivative. It has been shown in vitro that pimecrolimus binds to FKBP1A and also inhibits calcineurin. Thus pimecrolimus inhibits T-cell activation by inhibiting the synthesis and release of cytokines from T-cells. Pimecrolimus also prevents the release of inflammatory cytokines and mediators from mast cells.

Pimecrolimus, like tacrolimus, belongs to the ascomycin class of macrolactam immunosuppressives, acting by the inhibition of T-cell activation by the calcineurin pathway and inhibition of the release of numerous inflammatory cytokines, thereby preventing the cascade of immune and inflammatory signals. Pimecrolimus has a similar mode of action to that of tacrolimus but is more selective, with no effect on dendritic (Langerhans) cells. It has lower permeation through the skin than topical steroids or topical tacrolimus although they have not been compared with each other for their permeation ability through mucosa. In addition, in contrast with topical steroids, pimecrolimus does not produce skin atrophy.

== Development and production ==
Pimecrolimus was developed by Novartis. Its development number was ascomycin derivative ASM 981.

The New Drug Application (NDA) was filed December 15, 2000. It received US FDA approval on December 13, 2001. At its US approval, it was one of the first new eczema treatments introduced since the topical corticosteroids of the 1950s. It is available as a topical cream, once marketed by Novartis. Since early 2007, Galderma has been promoting the compound in Canada. The trade name is Elidel.
