= Hygromycin-B kinase =

hygromycin B kinase

Identifiers
- EC no.: 2.7.1.119
- CAS no.: 88361-67-5

Databases
- IntEnz: IntEnz view
- BRENDA: BRENDA entry
- ExPASy: NiceZyme view
- KEGG: KEGG entry
- MetaCyc: metabolic pathway
- PRIAM: profile
- PDB structures: RCSB PDB PDBe PDBsum
- Gene Ontology: AmiGO / QuickGO
Search
- PMC: articles
- PubMed: articles
- NCBI: proteins

In enzymology, a hygromycin-B kinase (EC 2.7.1.119) is an enzyme that catalyzes the chemical reaction

ATP + hygromycin B $\rightleftharpoons$ ADP + 7"-O-phosphohygromycin

Thus, the two substrates of this enzyme are ATP and hygromycin B, whereas its two products are ADP and 7''-O-phosphohygromycin.

This enzyme belongs to the family of transferases, specifically those transferring phosphorus-containing groups (phosphotransferases) with an alcohol group as acceptor. The systematic name of this enzyme class is ATP:hygromycin-B 7"-O-phosphotransferase. This enzyme is also called hygromycin B phosphotransferase.
