= Streptomyces azureus =

Scientific classification
- Domain: Bacteria
- Kingdom: Bacillati
- Phylum: Actinomycetota
- Class: Actinomycetes
- Order: Streptomycetales
- Family: Streptomycetaceae
- Genus: Streptomyces
- Species: S. azureus

Binomial name
- Streptomyces azureus Kelly et al. 1959

Type strain
- AS 4.1675, ATCC 14921, ATCC 19728, BCRC 12479, CBS 467.68, CCRC 12479, CGMCC 4.1675, DSM 40106, ETH 28555, IFO 12744, IMET 43765, IMRU 3705, ISP 5106, JCM 4217, JCM 4564, MTCC 3023, NBIMCC 1035, NBRC 12744, NRRL B-2655, NRRL-ISP 5106, PCM 2313, RIA 1009, SC 2364, UNIQEM 122, VKM Ac-719

Species of bacterium

Streptomyces azureus is a bacterium species from the genus of Streptomyces which has isolated from soil. Streptomyces azureus produces the antibiotic thiostrepton.

== See also ==
- List of Streptomyces species
