= Thiopeptide =

Class of peptide antibiotics

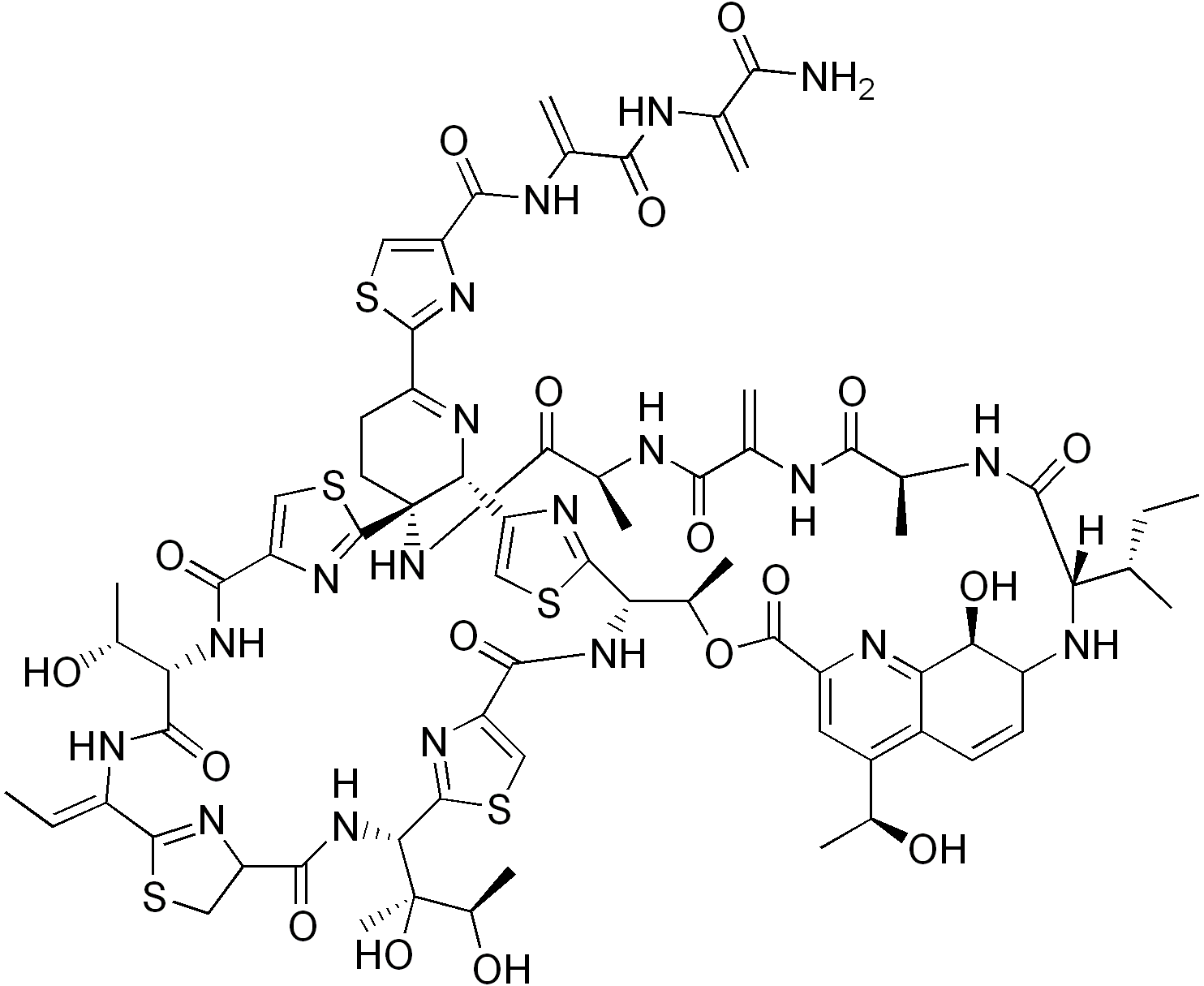
Chemical structure of thiostrepton, a thiopeptide

Thiopeptides (thiazolyl peptides) are a class of peptide antibiotics produced by bacteria. They have antibiotic activity against Gram-positive bacteria, but little or no activity against Gram-negative bacteria. Many of the members of this class show activity against methicillin-resistant Staphylococcus aureus (MRSA) and are therefore subjects of research interest.

There are over 100 members of this class known.

== Chemical structure ==
Thiopeptides are sulfur-rich macrocyclic peptides containing highly-modified amino acids. They are characterized by a nitrogen-containing six-membered ring (such as piperidine, dehydropiperidine, or pyridine) substituted with multiple thiazole rings and dehydroamino acids. A macrocylic ring serves as a scaffold for a tail that also incorporates modified amino acids often with azole rings, such as thiazoles, oxazoles, and thiazolines which are derived from serine, threonine, and cysteine residues.

== Examples ==
Examples of thiopeptides include thiostrepton, cyclothiazomycin, nosiheptide, and lactocillin.
