= Milbemycin =

Class of chemical compounds

The milbemycins are a group of macrolides chemically related to the avermectins and were first isolated in 1972 from Streptomyces hygroscopicus. They are used in veterinary medicine as antiparasitic agents against worms, ticks and fleas. They also show insecticidal and acaricidal activity.

== Mechanism of action ==
Milbemycins have a similar mechanism of action, but a longer half-life than the avermectins. They open glutamate-sensitive chloride channels in neurons and myocytes of invertebrates, leading to hyperpolarisation of these cells and blocking of signal transfer. They are in IRAC class 6.

Milbemycin is effective against some avermectin-resistant insects.

== Biosynthesis ==
Like avermectins, milbemycins are products of fermentation by Streptomyces species. A grand total of five species, namely S. hygroscopicus, S. griseochromogenes, S. cyaneogriseus, S. nanchanggensis and S. bingchenggensis, are known to produce this family of compounds.

The biosynthetic cluster from S. bingchenggensis and S. nanchanggensis have been sequenced and analyzed, partly by analogy to the homologous biosynthetic cluster for avermectin. New regulatory elements that control the production of milbemycins are being identified in hopes to improve the industrial fermentation yield of milbemycins, which (as of 2021) is much lower than that of avermectin.

An alternative pathway to higher yields was demonstrated in 2017, when select genes from S. avermitilis were swapped out so the avermectin producer makes milbemycin instead.

== Examples ==

Name	=R^{1}	=R^{2}	–R^{3}
Milbemectin	–H, (β)–OH	–H, –H	–CH_{3} : –CH_{2}CH_{3} = 3:7
Milbemycin oxime	=NOH	–H, –H	–CH_{3} : –CH_{2}CH_{3} = 3:7
Moxidectin	–H, (β)–OH	=NOCH_{3}	(Z)–C(CH_{3})=CH–CH(CH_{3})_{2}
Nemadectin	–H, (β)–OH	–H, (α)–OH	(Z)–C(CH_{3})=CH–CH(CH_{3})_{2}
