= Streptomyces laurentii =

Scientific classification
- Domain: Bacteria
- Kingdom: Bacillati
- Phylum: Actinomycetota
- Class: Actinomycetes
- Order: Streptomycetales
- Family: Streptomycetaceae
- Genus: Streptomyces
- Species: S. laurentii

Binomial name
- Streptomyces laurentii Trejo et al. 1979 (Approved Lists 1980)

Type strain
- ATCC 31255, BCRC 16804, CCRC 16804, CGMCC 4.1919, DSM 41684, IFO 15422, IMET 43866, JCM 5063, KCC S-1063, LMG 19959, MS 1477, NBRC 15422, PCM 2368, SC 9895

Species of bacterium

Streptomyces laurentii is a bacterium species from the genus of Streptomyces which has been isolated from soil. Streptomyces laurentii produces thiostrepton.

== See also ==
- List of Streptomyces species
