= Alpha,alpha-trehalose-phosphate synthase (UDP-forming) =

Class of enzymes

alpha,alpha-trehalose-phosphate synthase (UDP-forming)

Identifiers
- EC no.: 2.4.1.15
- CAS no.: 9030-07-3

Databases
- IntEnz: IntEnz view
- BRENDA: BRENDA entry
- ExPASy: NiceZyme view
- KEGG: KEGG entry
- MetaCyc: metabolic pathway
- PRIAM: profile
- PDB structures: RCSB PDB PDBe PDBsum
- Gene Ontology: AmiGO / QuickGO
Search
- PMC: articles
- PubMed: articles
- NCBI: proteins

In enzymology, an alpha,alpha-trehalose-phosphate synthase (UDP-forming) (EC 2.4.1.15) is an enzyme that catalyzes the chemical reaction

UDP-glucose + D-glucose 6-phosphate $\rightleftharpoons$ UDP + alpha,alpha-trehalose 6-phosphate

Thus, the two substrates of this enzyme are UDP-glucose and D-glucose 6-phosphate, whereas its two products are UDP and alpha,alpha'-trehalose 6-phosphate.

This enzyme belongs to the family of glycosyltransferases, specifically the hexosyltransferases. The systematic name of this enzyme class is UDP-glucose:D-glucose-6-phosphate 1-alpha-D-glucosyltransferase. Other names in common use include UDP-glucose-glucose-phosphate glucosyltransferase, trehalosephosphate-UDP glucosyltransferase, UDP-glucose-glucose-phosphate glucosyltransferase, alpha,alpha-trehalose phosphate synthase (UDP-forming), phosphotrehalose-uridine diphosphate transglucosylase, trehalose 6-phosphate synthase, trehalose 6-phosphate synthetase, trehalose phosphate synthase, trehalose phosphate synthetase, trehalose phosphate-uridine diphosphate glucosyltransferase, trehalose-P synthetase, transglucosylase, and uridine diphosphoglucose phosphate glucosyltransferase. This enzyme participates in starch and sucrose metabolism.

== Structural studies ==
As of late 2007, 3 structures have been solved for this class of enzymes, with PDB accession codes 1GZ5, 1UQT, and 1UQU.
