= Totomycin =

Chemical compound

Clinical data
- Other names: Hygromycin A, Homomycin
- ATC code: none

Identifiers
- IUPAC name: (E)-N-[(3aS,4R,5R,6S,7R,7aR)-4,6,7-Trihydroxy-3a,4,5,6,7,7a-hexahydro-1,3-benzodioxol-5-yl]-3-[4-[(2S,3S,4S,5S)-5-acetyl-3,4-dihydroxyoxolan-2-yl]oxy-3-hydroxyphenyl]-2-methylprop-2-enamide
- CAS Number: 6379-56-2
- PubChem CID: 6433481
- ChemSpider: 4938630
- UNII: 3YJY415DDI
- CompTox Dashboard (EPA): DTXSID501349167 DTXSID70980360, DTXSID501349167

Chemical and physical data
- Formula: C_{23}H_{29}NO_{12}
- Molar mass: 511.480 g·mol^{−1}
- 3D model (JSmol): Interactive image
- Melting point: 110 to 112 °C (230 to 234 °F) (decomp.)
- SMILES: C/C(=C\C1=CC(=C(C=C1)O[C@H]2[C@H]([C@@H]([C@H](O2)C(=O)C)O)O)O)/C(=O)N[C@@H]3[C@@H]([C@H]([C@@H]4[C@H]([C@@H]3O)OCO4)O)O
- InChI: InChI=1S/C23H29NO12/c1-8(22(32)24-13-14(27)16(29)21-20(15(13)28)33-7-34-21)5-10-3-4-12(11(26)6-10)35-23-18(31)17(30)19(36-23)9(2)25/h3-6,13-21,23,26-31H,7H2,1-2H3,(H,24,32)/b8-5+/t13-,14+,15-,16-,17+,18+,19-,20+,21-,23-/m1/s1; Key:YQYJSBFKSSDGFO-IIHALWDASA-N

Hygromycin A (also known as totomycin) is a modified cinnamic acid flanked by a furanose sugar and aminocyclitol (not to be confused with hygromycin B, belonging to an unrelated class of antibiotics, aminoglycosides). It is produced by Streptomyces hygroscopicus, first described in the 1950s.

== History ==
Hygromycin A was discovered in a soil sample from a forest near Indianapolis, Indiana in 1953 by Waksman and Henrici. Identification and structure of totomycin was not determined until 1957.

Little further research was performed on totomycin for decades afterwards due to its weak activity against most bacteria, and as of 2021 its safety or efficacy in humans have not been assessed in any preclinical or clinical trials, although some initial results in mice were promising.

== Antibiotic activity ==
It was thought that the strongest antibiotic activity of totomycin was against Staphylococcus haemolyticus, in which growth was inhibited by concentrations of 2 μg/mL. Other gram-positive and gram-negative sensitive to totomycin are inhibited by concentrations from 16 to 31 μg/mL.

In 2021 it was reported that Hygromycin A is very effective against spirochetes and can be used to eliminate the spirochete that causes Lyme disease. Bait laced with hygromycin A could be used to eliminate Lyme disease in the wild.

== Total synthesis ==
Totomycin has been a successful target in total synthesis since 1989.
