= Ascomycin =

Chemical compound

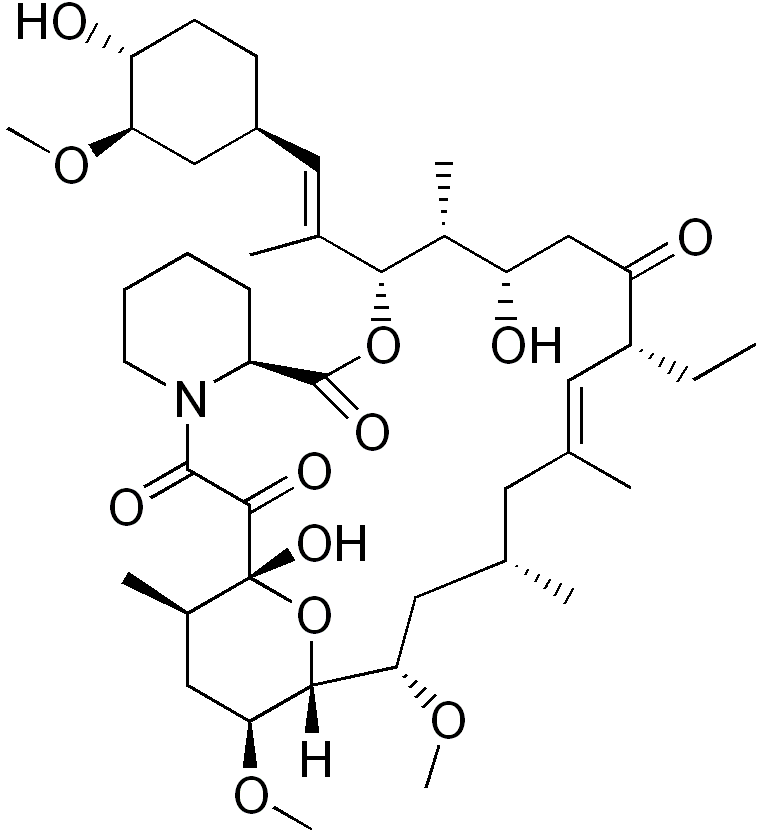

Clinical data
- Other names: 17-ethyl-1,14-dihydroxy-12-[2-(4-hydroxy-3-methoxy-cyclohexyl)-1-methyl-vinyl]-23,25-dimethoxy-13,19,21,27-tetramethyl-11,28-dioxa-4-aza-tricyclo[22.3.1.04,9]octacos-18-ene-2,3,10,16-tetraone
- ATC code: none

Identifiers
- IUPAC name: (3S,4R,5S,8R,9Z,12S,14S,15R,16S,18R,19R,26aS)-8-ethyl-5,19-dihydroxy-3-{(E)-2-[(1R,3R,4R)-4-hydroxy-3-methoxycyclohexyl]-1-methylvinyl}-14,16-dimethoxy-4,10,12,18-tetramethyl-4,5,6,8,11,12,13,14,15,16,17,18,19,24,25,26,26a-heptadecahydro-3H-15,19-epoxypyrido[2,1-c][1,4]oxazacyclotricosine-1,7,20,21(23H)-tetrone
- CAS Number: 104987-12-4
- PubChem CID: 5282071
- ChemSpider: 4445297
- UNII: AUF4U5NSJK
- ChEBI: CHEBI:29582
- ChEMBL: ChEMBL8597
- CompTox Dashboard (EPA): DTXSID80894126
- ECHA InfoCard: 100.108.430

Chemical and physical data
- Formula: C_{43}H_{69}NO_{12}
- Molar mass: 792.020 g·mol^{−1}
- 3D model (JSmol): Interactive image
- SMILES: O=C3C(=O)N1CCCC[C@H]1C(=O)O[C@H](C(=C/[C@@H]2CC[C@@H](O)[C@H](OC)C2)/C)[C@H](C)[C@@H](O)CC(=O)[C@@H](/C=C(\C[C@@H](C[C@H](OC)[C@H]4O[C@]3(O)[C@H](C)C[C@@H]4OC)C)C)CC
- InChI: InChI=1S/C43H69NO12/c1-10-30-18-24(2)17-25(3)19-36(53-8)39-37(54-9)21-27(5)43(51,56-39)40(48)41(49)44-16-12-11-13-31(44)42(50)55-38(28(6)33(46)23-34(30)47)26(4)20-29-14-15-32(45)35(22-29)52-7/h18,20,25,27-33,35-39,45-46,51H,10-17,19,21-23H2,1-9H3/b24-18+,26-20+/t25-,27+,28+,29-,30+,31-,32+,33-,35+,36-,37-,38+,39+,43+/m0/s1; Key:ZDQSOHOQTUFQEM-NURRSENYSA-N

Ascomycin, also called Immunomycin, FR-900520, FK520, is an ethyl analog of tacrolimus (FK506) with strong immunosuppressant properties. It has been researched for the treatment of autoimmune diseases and skin diseases, and to prevent rejection after an organ transplant.

Ascomycin acts by binding to immunophilins, especially macrophilin-12. It appears that Ascomycin inhibits the production of Th1 (interferon- and IL-2) and Th2 (IL-4 and IL-10) cytokines. Additionally, ascomycin preferentially inhibits the activation of mast cells, an important cellular component of the atopic response. Ascomycin produces a more selective immunomodulatory effect in that it inhibits the elicitation phase of allergic contact dermatitis but does not impair the primary immune response when administered systemically.

Ascomycin is produced by the fermentation of certain strains of Streptomyces hygroscopicus.

== In fiction ==
Ascomycin is also the name of a fictional "antiagathic" (anti-aging) drug in James Blish's future history Cities in Flight. and in its component novel They Shall Have Stars.

== Related compounds ==
Tacrolimus, Pimecrolimus
