= Thiostrepton =

Chemical compound

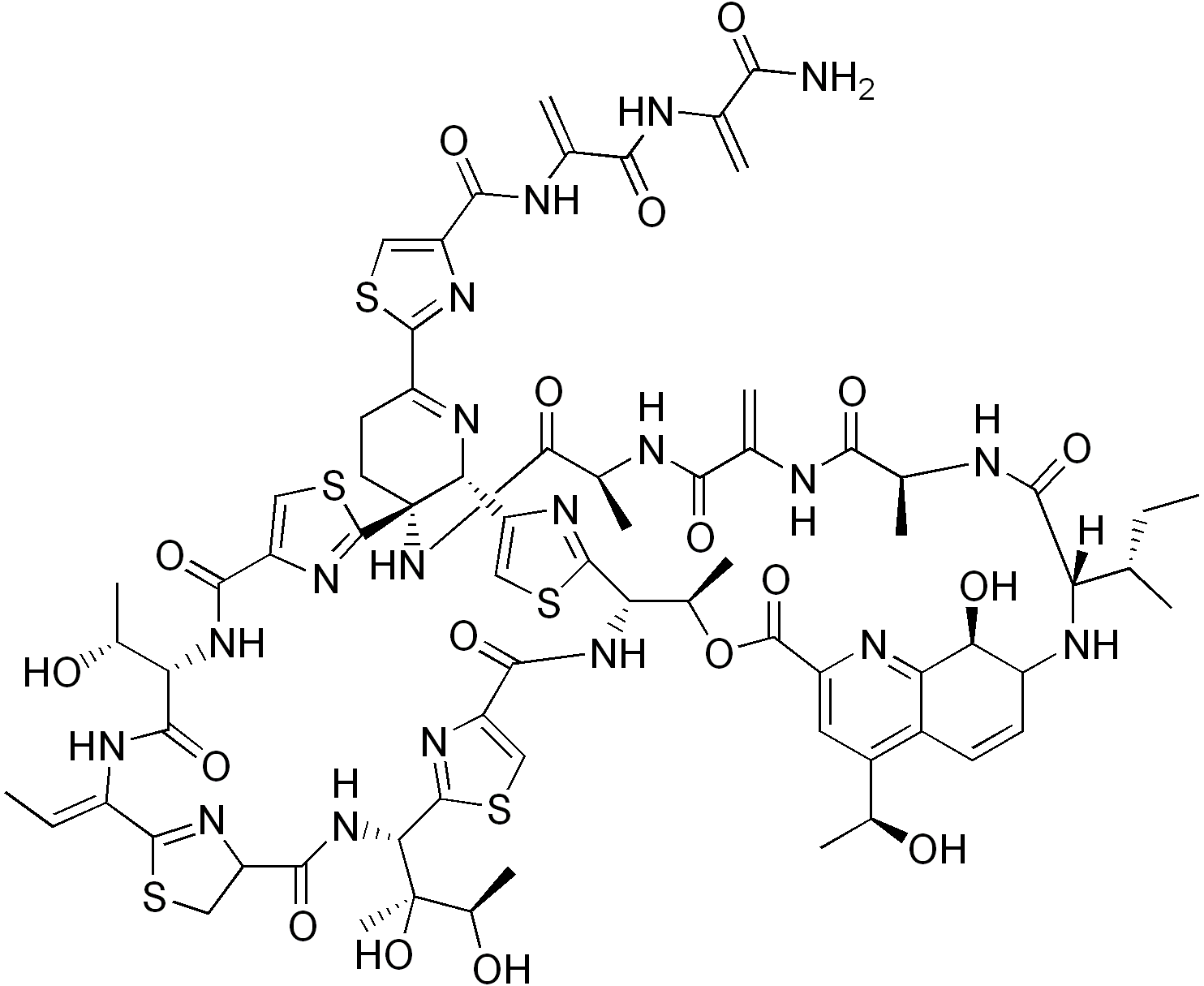

Names
- IUPAC name N-[3-[(3-amino-3-oxoprop-1-en-2-yl)amino]-3-oxoprop-1-en-2-yl]-2-[(1R,8S,11Z,18S,25S,26R,53S,59S)-37-butan-2-yl-18-[(2S,3R)-2,3-dihydroxybutan-2-yl]-11-ethylidene-59-hydroxy-8-[(1R)-1-hydroxyethyl]-31-[(1S)-1-hydroxyethyl]-26,40,46-trimethyl-43-methylidene-6,9,16,23,28,38,41,44,47-nonaoxo-27-oxa-3,13,20,56-tetrathia-7,10,17,24,36,39,42,45,48,52,58,61,62,63,64-pentadecazanonacyclo[23.23.9.329,35.12,5.112,15.119,22.154,57.01,53.032,60]tetrahexaconta-2(64),4,12(63),19(62),21,29(61),30,32(60),33,51,54,57-dodecaen-51-yl]-1,3-thiazole-4-carboxamide
- Other names Alaninamide, Bryamycin, Thiactin

Identifiers
CAS Number	1393-48-2
3D model (JSmol)	Interactive image
ChEBI	CHEBI:29693
ChEMBL	ChEMBL468719
ChemSpider	24603973
ECHA InfoCard	100.014.304
EC Number	215-734-9
PubChem CID	16130278
UNII	HR4S203Y18
CompTox Dashboard (EPA)	DTXSID5040625
- InChI: InChI=1S/C72H85N19O18S5/c1-14-26(3)47-63(105)78-30(7)57(99)75-28(5)56(98)76-31(8)58(100)91-72-19-18-40(66-85-43(22-111-66)59(101)77-29(6)55(97)74-27(4)54(73)96)81-52(72)42-21-112-67(83-42)49(34(11)109-69(107)41-20-37(32(9)92)36-16-17-39(79-47)51(95)50(36)80-41)89-60(102)44-24-113-68(86-44)53(71(13,108)35(12)94)90-62(104)45-23-110-65(84-45)38(15-2)82-64(106)48(33(10)93)88-61(103)46-25-114-70(72)87-46/h15-17,20-22,24-26,30-35,39,45,47-49,51-53,79,92-95,108H,4-6,14,18-19,23H2,1-3,7-13H3,(H2,73,96)(H,74,97)(H,75,99)(H,76,98)(H,77,101)(H,78,105)(H,82,106)(H,88,103)(H,89,102)(H,90,104)(H,91,100)/b38-15-/t26-,30-,31-,32-,33+,34+,35+,39+,45+,47-,48-,49-,51-,52+,53+,71+,72+/m0/s1 Key: NSFFHOGKXHRQEW-AIHSUZKVSA-N
- SMILES: C[C@@H](O)[C@@](C)(O)[C@@H](C2=NC6=CS2)NC(C1CSC(/C(NC([C@@H](NC(C3=CS[C@]([C@]4(NC([C@@H](NC(C(NC([C@H](C)NC%10=O)=O)=C)=O)C)=O)C(C5=CSC([C@H]([C@@H](C)OC(C8=CC([C@H](C)O)=C(C=CC(N[C@]([H])%10[C@H](CC)C)[C@@H]9O)C9=N8)=O)NC6=O)=N5)N=C(C7=NC(C(NC(C(NC(C(N)=O)=C)=O)=C)=O)=CS7)CC4)=N3)=O)[C@@H](C)O)=O)=C/C)=N1)=O

Properties
Chemical formula	C_{72}H_{85}N_{19}O_{18}S_{5}
Molar mass	1664.83 g/mol
Appearance	White to off-white powder
Melting point	246 to 256 °C (475 to 493 °F; 519 to 529 K)
Solubility in water	Insoluble
Solubility in other solvents	Soluble in CHCl_{3}, CH_{2}Cl_{2}, dioxane, pyridine, glacial acetic acid, DMF. Practically insoluble in the lower alcohols, nonpolar organic solvents, diluted aqueous acids or bases. May be dissolved by methanolic acid or base, but with decomposition.

Hazards
- GHS labelling
Pictograms	(GHS07: Exclamation mark)
Signal word	Warning
Hazard statements	H302
Precautionary statements	P264, P270, P301+P312, P330, P501
- Except where otherwise noted, data are given for materials in their standard state (at 25 °C [77 °F], 100 kPa). verify (what is ?) Infobox references

Thiostrepton is a natural cyclic oligopeptide antibiotic of the thiopeptide class, derived from several strains of streptomycetes, such as Streptomyces azureus and Streptomyces laurentii. Thiostrepton is a natural product of the ribosomally synthesized and post-translationally modified peptide (RiPP) class.

== History ==
Thiostrepton was discovered by Donovick et al. who described its antibacterial properties in 1955. Dorothy Crowfoot Hodgkin solved the structure of thiostrepton in 1970. Early in 1978, Bycroft and Gowland proposed the biosynthesis of thiostrepton, which was still unclear until 2009. Several studies of thiopeptide biosynthesis have been contemporarily published in 2009 and two of them (Liao et al. and Kelly et al.) included the similar biosynthesis of thiostrepton: it's ribosomally synthesized from thiostrepton biosynthetic genes (tsr genes) and posttranslational modification is needed.

A total synthesis of thiostrepton was completed by K.C. Nicolaou, et al. in 2004.

== Applications ==
Thiostrepton has been used in veterinary medicine in mastitis caused by gram-negative organisms and in dermatologic disorders. It is mostly used in complex ointments containing neomycin, nystatin, Thiostrepton and topical steroids. It is also active against gram-positive bacteria. It is notable that ointments for human usage contain neomycin, nystatin, and topical steroids, but no thiostrepton.

Thiostrepton was reported (in 2008) to exhibit activity against breast cancer cells through targeting the transcription factor forkhead box M1 (FOXM1), also in 2011. It has also been shown to circumvent acquired cisplatin resistance in breast cancer cells under in vitro conditions.

Thiostrepton is used in molecular biology as a reagent for both positive and negative selection of genes involved in nucleotide metabolism.

Thiostrepton has also shown promise in treating osteoporosis in animal models because it can inhibit unusual osteoclast precursor cells.

The antibiotic thiostrepton was identified as an insulin resistance reversal agent. Subsequent validation in ex vivo insulin-resistant mouse muscle and palmitate-induced insulin-resistant myotubes demonstrated potent insulin action restoration, possibly via upregulation of glycolysis due to attenuation of mitochondrial oxidative phosphorylation by thiostrepton.

== Effects of thiostrepton on stringent response ==
Thiostrepton binds to the L11 protein of the large ribosomal subunit. Mutations in this protein confer resistance to this metabolite. The L11 protein is also essential for regulating the RelA protein and activating the synthesis of the cellular alarmone (p)ppGpp, which, in turn, triggers the stringent response and antibiotic synthesis. Furthermore, amino acid substitutions in the L11 protein that confer resistance to thiostrepton also inhibit the stringent response in strains belonging to the Streptomyces genus. A similar mechanism has been observed in Neisseria gonorrhoeae, where thiostrepton reduces the synthesis of (p)ppGpp, inhibiting the activation of the persistence. Persistence is a mechanism that allows bacteria to survive antibiotic treatments and other stressors by enabling a subpopulation of bacteria to become metabolically inactive.

== Biosynthesis ==
There are total 21 genes (tsrA~tsrU) in the biosynthetic gene cluster. The precursor of thiostrepton contains 58 amino acids in the peptide chain, which includes 41-aa leader peptide (LP) and 17-aa structural peptide (IASASCTTCICTCSCSS). Once the precursor is synthesized, cyclodehydratase tsrO and dehydrogenase tsrM catalyze the formation of thiazole or thiazoline from every cysteine residues in the peptide chain. After thiazole/thiazoline formation, dehydratases tsrJ, K and S then convert all the serine residues into dehydroalanines. A hetero Diels-Alder cyclization of the central dehydropiperidine (at S5, C13, and S14) has been suggested by Bycroft back to 1978 and been employed in the chemical synthesis of this core structure by Nicolaou et al. in 2005. An alternative mechanism of the dehydropiperidine formation has also been suggested by Kelly et al. in 2009. Nevertheless, based on experimental evidence, tsrN and L are suggested to be responsible for the hetero Diels-Alder cyclization. The quinaldic acid moiety is suggested to be synthesized by the nine genes tsrFAEBDUPQI from tryptophan and then results in the closure of quinaldic acid macrocycle. At last, tsrR serves as a candidate for the oxidation of the Ile residue to afford thiostrepton.

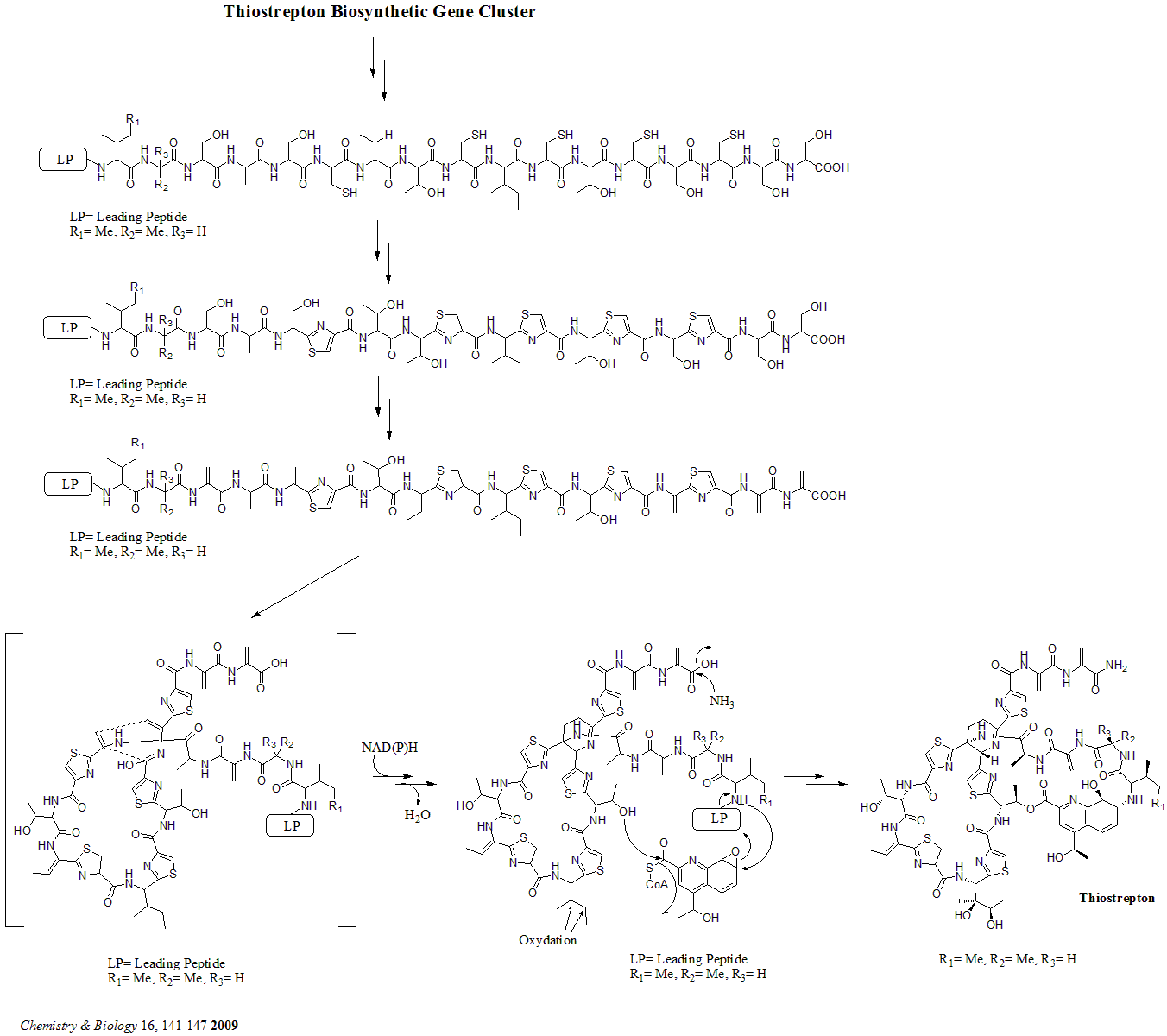

=== Alternative mechanism for the formation of the dehydropiperidine core ===
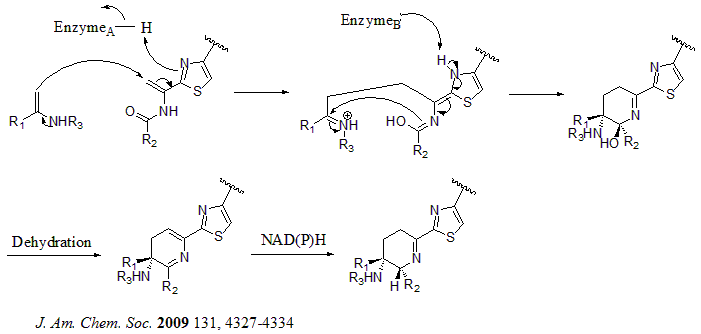

== Total synthesis ==
In 2005, Nicolaou et al. published the total synthesis of thiostrepton. At first, they constructed the key building blocks of thiostrepton (1): dehydropiperidine core (2), thiazoline macrocycle (3), bis-dehydroalanine tail (4), and quinaldic acid macrocycle (5). Then they assembled the building blocks sequentially as shown in the synthetic scheme (compound numbers are from the reference).

=== Building blocks ===
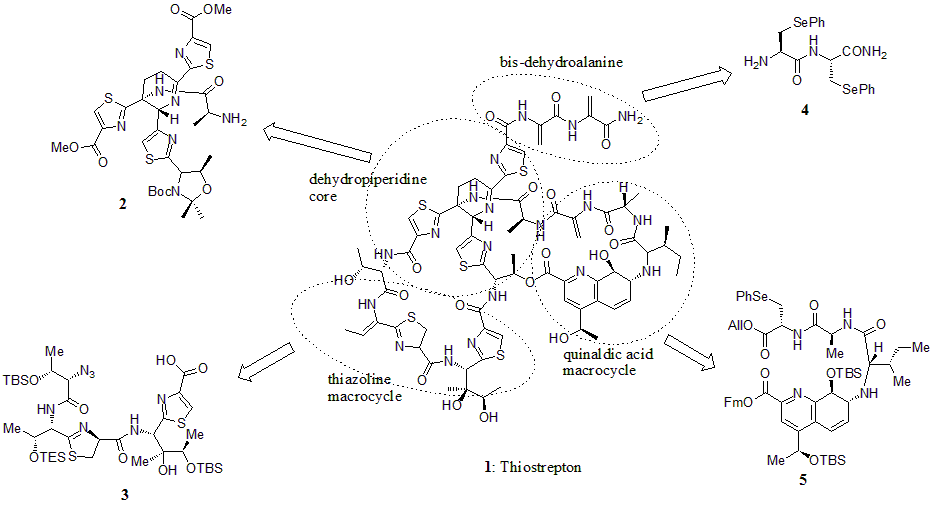

=== Synthetic scheme ===
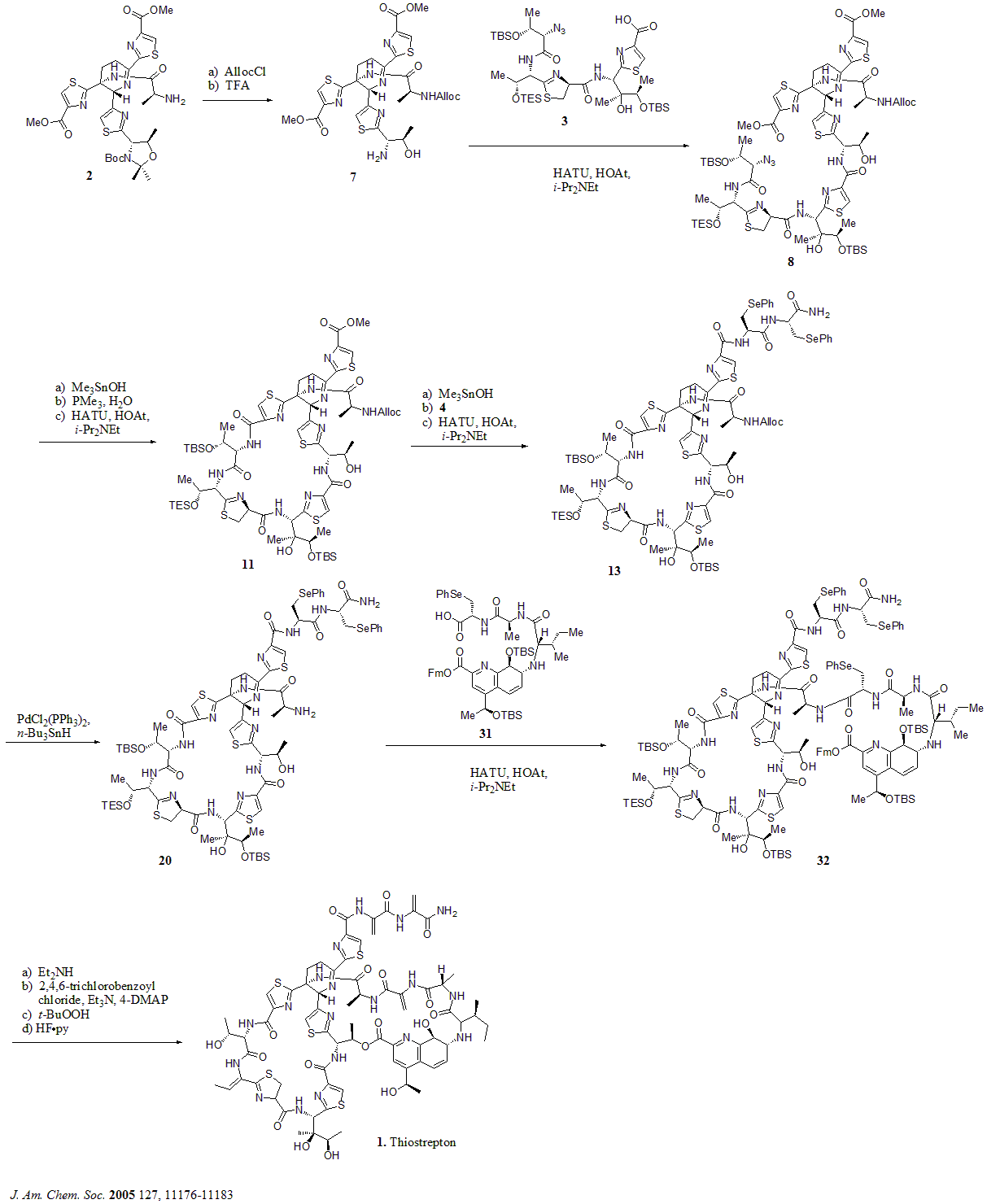
