= Hygromycin B =

Chemical compound

Clinical data
- Trade names: Hygromix
- Other names: O-6-Amino-6-deoxy-L-glycero-D-galacto-heptopyranosylidene-(1-2-3)-O-β-D-talopyranosyl(1-5)-2-deoxy-N^{3}-methyl-D-streptamine, HYG
- AHFS/Drugs.com: International Drug Names
- ATC code: none

Identifiers
- IUPAC name: (3' R,3aS,4S,4' R,5' R,6R,6' R,7S,7aS)-4-{[(1R,2S,3R,5S,6R)-3-amino-2,6-dihydroxy-5-(methylamino)cyclohexyl]oxy}-6'-[(1S)-1-amino-2-hydroxyethyl]-6-(hydroxymethyl)-tetrahydro-3aH-spiro[[1,3]dioxolo[4,5-c]pyran-2,2'-oxane]-3',4',5',7-tetrol
- CAS Number: 31282-04-9
- PubChem CID: 35766
- ChemSpider: 32900
- UNII: 3XQ2233B0B
- ChEMBL: ChEMBL1276484
- CompTox Dashboard (EPA): DTXSID7041045
- ECHA InfoCard: 100.045.935

Chemical and physical data
- Formula: C_{20}H_{37}N_{3}O_{13}
- Molar mass: 527.524 g·mol^{−1}
- 3D model (JSmol): Interactive image
- Melting point: 160 to 180 °C (320 to 356 °F) (decomp.)
- SMILES: O1[C@H]4[C@@H](OC12O[C@@H]([C@H](O)[C@@H](O)[C@H]2O)[C@@H](N)CO)[C@@H](O)[C@H](O[C@H]4O[C@@H]3[C@@H](O)[C@H](N)C[C@H](NC)[C@H]3O)CO
- InChI: InChI=1S/C20H37N3O13/c1-23-7-2-5(21)9(26)15(10(7)27)33-19-17-16(11(28)8(4-25)32-19)35-20(36-17)18(31)13(30)12(29)14(34-20)6(22)3-24/h5-19,23-31H,2-4,21-22H2,1H3/t5-,6+,7+,8-,9+,10-,11+,12-,13-,14-,15-,16+,17+,18-,19+,20?/m1/s1; Key:GRRNUXAQVGOGFE-KPBUCVLVSA-N

Hygromycin B is an antibiotic produced by the bacterium Streptomyces hygroscopicus. It is an aminoglycoside that kills bacteria, fungi and other eukaryotic cells by inhibiting protein synthesis.

== History ==
Hygromycin B was originally developed in the 1950s for use with animals and is still added into swine and chicken feed as an anthelmintic or anti-worming agent (product name: Hygromix). Hygromycin B is produced by Streptomyces hygroscopicus, a bacterium isolated in 1953 from a soil sample. Resistance genes were discovered in the early 1980s.

== Mechanism of action ==
Hygromycin B, along with aminoglycosides, inhibits protein synthesis by strengthening the interaction of tRNA binding in the ribosomal A-site. Hygromycin B also prevents mRNA and tRNA translocation by an unknown mechanism.

== Use in research ==
In the laboratory it is used for the selection and maintenance of prokaryotic and eukaryotic cells that contain the hygromycin resistance gene. The resistance gene is a kinase that inactivates hygromycin B through phosphorylation. Since the discovery of hygromycin-resistance genes, hygromycin B has become a standard selection antibiotic in gene transfer experiments in many prokaryotic and eukaryotic cells. Based on impurity monitor method, four different kinds of impurities are discovered in commercial hygromycin B from different suppliers and toxicities of different impurities to the cell lines are described in the following external links.

Fungus Coniothyrium minitans was transformed with the hygromycin B resistance gene to improve the infection rates of Sclerotinia sclerotiorum, a fungal parasite of many crops.

=== Use in plant research ===
Hygromycin resistance gene is frequently used as a selectable marker in research on plants. In rice Agrobacterium-mediated transformation system, hygromycin is used at about 30–75 mg L^{−1}, with an average of 50 mg L^{−1}. The use of hygromycin at 50 mg L^{−1} demonstrated highly toxic to non-transformed calli. Thus, it can be efficiently used to select transformants.
