= Alpha,alpha-trehalose-phosphate synthase (GDP-forming) =

Class of enzymes

alpha,alpha-trehalose-phosphate synthase (GDP-forming)

Identifiers
- EC no.: 2.4.1.36
- CAS no.: 37257-32-2

Databases
- IntEnz: IntEnz view
- BRENDA: BRENDA entry
- ExPASy: NiceZyme view
- KEGG: KEGG entry
- MetaCyc: metabolic pathway
- PRIAM: profile
- PDB structures: RCSB PDB PDBe PDBsum
- Gene Ontology: AmiGO / QuickGO
Search
- PMC: articles
- PubMed: articles
- NCBI: proteins

In enzymology, an alpha,alpha-trehalose-phosphate synthase (GDP-forming) (EC 2.4.1.36) is an enzyme that catalyzes the chemical reaction

GDP-glucose + glucose 6-phosphate $\rightleftharpoons$ GDP + alpha,alpha-trehalose 6-phosphate

Thus, the two substrates of this enzyme are GDP-glucose and glucose 6-phosphate, whereas its two products are GDP and alpha,alpha'-trehalose 6-phosphate.

This enzyme belongs to the family of glycosyltransferases, specifically the hexosyltransferases. The systematic name of this enzyme class is GDP-glucose:D-glucose-6-phosphate 1-alpha-D-glucosyltransferase. Other names in common use include GDP-glucose-glucose-phosphate glucosyltransferase, guanosine diphosphoglucose-glucose phosphate glucosyltransferase, and trehalose phosphate synthase (GDP-forming).
