= Dolichyl =

Dolichyl, related to Dolichol, is used in the names of:

- Dolichyl beta-D-glucosyl phosphate, a molecule involved in glycosylation
- Dolichyl-diphosphate—polyphosphate phosphotransferase (EC 2.7.4.20)
- Dolichyl-diphosphooligosaccharide—protein glycotransferase (EC 2.4.1.119)
- Dolichyl-phosphatase (EC 3.1.3.51)
- Dolichyl-phosphate alpha-N-acetylglucosaminyltransferase (EC 2.4.1.153)
- Dolichyl-phosphate beta-D-mannosyltransferase (EC 2.4.1.83)
- Dolichyl-phosphate beta-glucosyltransferase (EC 2.4.1.117)
- Dolichyl-phosphate D-xylosyltransferase (EC 2.4.2.32)
- Dolichyl-phosphate-mannose—glycolipid alpha-mannosyltransferase (EC 2.4.1.130)
- Dolichyl-phosphate-mannose-protein mannosyltransferase (EC 2.4.1.109)
- Dolichyl-xylosyl-phosphate—protein xylosyltransferase (EC 2.4.2.33)
- UDP-N-acetylglucosamine—dolichyl-phosphate N-acetylglucosaminephosphotransferase (EC 2.7.8.15)
