= ALG6 (enzyme class) =

Class of enzymes

Dolichyl-P-Glc:Man9GlcNAc2-PP-dolichol alpha-1,3-glucosyltransferase

Identifiers
- EC no.: 2.4.1.267

Databases
- IntEnz: IntEnz view
- BRENDA: BRENDA entry
- ExPASy: NiceZyme view
- KEGG: KEGG entry
- MetaCyc: metabolic pathway
- PRIAM: profile
- PDB structures: RCSB PDB PDBe PDBsum
Search
- PMC: articles
- PubMed: articles
- NCBI: proteins

Dolichyl-P-Glc:Man9GlcNAc2-PP-dolichol alpha-1,3-glucosyltransferase (EC 2.4.1.267, ALG6, Dol-P-Glc:Man9GlcNAc2-PP-Dol alpha-1,3-glucosyltransferase) is an enzyme with systematic name dolichyl beta-D-glucosyl phosphate:D-Man-alpha-(1->2)-D-Man-alpha-(1->2)-D-Man-alpha-(1->3)-(D-Man-alpha-(1->2)-D-Man-alpha-(1->3)-(D-Man-alpha-(1->2)-D-Man-alpha-(1->6))-D-Man-alpha-(1->6))-D-Man-beta-(1->4)-D-GlcNAc-beta-(1->4)-D-GlcNAc-diphosphodolichol alpha-1,3-glucosyltransferase.

This enzyme catalyses the following chemical reaction

This is the chemical reaction that is mediated by the enzyme dolichyl-P-Glc:Man9GlcNAc2-PP-dolichol alpha-1,3-glucosyltransferase.

which is:

dolichyl beta-D-glucosyl phosphate + D-Man-alpha-(1->2)-D-Man-alpha-(1->2)-D-Man-alpha-(1->3)-[D-Man-alpha-(1->2)-D-Man-alpha-(1->3)-[D-Man-alpha-(1->2)-D-Man-alpha-(1->6)]-D-Man-alpha-(1->6)]-D-Man-beta-(1->4)-D-GlcNAc-beta-(1->4)-D-GlcNAc-diphosphodolichol $\rightleftharpoons$ D-Glc-alpha-(1->3)-D-Man-alpha-(1->2)-D-Man-alpha-(1->2)-D-Man-alpha-(1->3)-[D-Man-alpha-(1->2)-D-Man-alpha-(1->3)-[D-Man-alpha-(1->2)-D-Man-alpha-(1->6)]-D-Man-alpha-(1->6)]-D-Man-beta-(1->4)-D-GlcNAc-beta-(1->4)-D-GlcNAc-diphosphodolichol + dolichyl phosphate

== See also ==
- EC 2.4.1.265 (Dol-P-Glc:Glc1Man9GlcNAc2-PP-Dol alpha-1,3-glucosyltransferase)
- EC 2.4.1.256 (Dol-P-Glc:Glc2Man9GlcNAc2-PP-Dol alpha-1,2-glucosyltransferase)
