= ALG10B =

Protein-coding gene in humans

Identifiers
- Aliases: ALG10B, ALG10, KCR1, alpha-1,2-glucosyltransferase, ALG10 alpha-1,2-glucosyltransferase B
- External IDs: OMIM: 603313; MGI: 2146159; GeneCards: ALG10B
Enzyme activity
EC #	BRENDA	ExPASy	KEGG	MetaCyc
2.4.1.256	↗	↗	↗	↗

Gene location (Human)
Chr.	Chromosome 12 (human)
Band	12q12	Start	38,316,762 bp
Band	12q12	End	38,329,721 bp

Gene location (Mouse)
Chr.	Chromosome 15 (mouse)
Band	15|15 E3	Start	90,108,514 bp
Band	15|15 E3	End	90,117,674 bp
RNA expression pattern
Bgee	Human / Mouse (ortholog); Top expressed in: Achilles tendon; retinal pigment epithelium; tibia; testicle; germinal epithelium; gonad; ventricular zone; ganglionic eminence; mucosa of paranasal sinus; endometrium / Top expressed in: hand; secondary oocyte; superior cervical ganglion; primary oocyte; atrioventricular valve; otolith organ; trigeminal ganglion; utricle; endocardial cushion; medial ganglionic eminence; More reference expression data
BioGPS	n/a
Gene ontology
Molecular function	dolichyl-phosphate-glucose-glycolipid alpha-glucosyltransferase activity; glycosyltransferase activity; transferase activity; dolichyl pyrophosphate Glc2Man9GlcNAc2 alpha-1,2-glucosyltransferase activity
Cellular component	integral component of membrane; plasma membrane; endoplasmic reticulum membrane; membrane; endoplasmic reticulum
Biological process	dolichol-linked oligosaccharide biosynthetic process; protein glycosylation; positive regulation of protein glycosylation; positive regulation of inward rectifier potassium channel activity
Sources:Amigo / QuickGO
Orthologs
Databases	NCBI: entry; OMA: entry
Species	Human	Mouse
Entrez	144245	380959
Ensembl	ENSG00000175548	ENSMUSG00000075470
UniProt	Q5I7T1	Q3UGP8
RefSeq (mRNA)	NM_001013620; NM_001308340	NM_001033441
RefSeq (protein)	NP_001013642; NP_001295269	NP_001028613
Location (UCSC)	Chr 12: 38.32 – 38.33 Mb	Chr 15: 90.11 – 90.12 Mb
PubMed search
- Wikidata
View/Edit Human	View/Edit Mouse

Alpha-1,2-glucosyltransferase ALG10-B is an enzyme that in humans is encoded by the ALG10B gene. It is a member of the Dolichyl-P-Glc:Glc2Man9GlcNAc2-PP-dolichol alpha-1,2-glucosyltransferase class of enzymes. It has ubiquitous expression in 27 tissues.
