= ALG10 =

Protein-coding gene in humans

Identifiers
- Aliases: ALG10, ALG10A, DIE2, KCR1, alpha-1,2-glucosyltransferase, ALG10 alpha-1,2-glucosyltransferase
- External IDs: OMIM: 618355; MGI: 2146159; GeneCards: ALG10
Enzyme activity
EC #	BRENDA	ExPASy	KEGG	MetaCyc
2.4.1.256	↗	↗	↗	↗

Gene location (Human)
Chr.	Chromosome 12 (human)
Band	12p11.1	Start	34,022,468 bp
Band	12p11.1	End	34,029,694 bp

Gene location (Mouse)
Chr.	Chromosome 15 (mouse)
Band	15|15 E3	Start	90,108,514 bp
Band	15|15 E3	End	90,117,674 bp
RNA expression pattern
Bgee	Human / Mouse (ortholog); Top expressed in: gonad; testicle; bone marrow cell; Achilles tendon; islet of Langerhans; stromal cell of endometrium; secondary oocyte; monocyte; epithelium of colon; appendix / Top expressed in: hand; secondary oocyte; superior cervical ganglion; primary oocyte; atrioventricular valve; otolith organ; trigeminal ganglion; utricle; endocardial cushion; medial ganglionic eminence; More reference expression data
BioGPS	n/a
Gene ontology
Molecular function	dolichyl-phosphate-glucose-glycolipid alpha-glucosyltransferase activity; transferase activity; glycosyltransferase activity; dolichyl pyrophosphate Glc2Man9GlcNAc2 alpha-1,2-glucosyltransferase activity
Cellular component	integral component of membrane; endoplasmic reticulum membrane; endoplasmic reticulum; membrane
Biological process	protein glycosylation; dolichol-linked oligosaccharide biosynthetic process
Sources:Amigo / QuickGO
Orthologs
Databases	NCBI: entry; OMA: entry
Species	Human	Mouse
Entrez	84920	380959
Ensembl	ENSG00000139133	ENSMUSG00000075470
UniProt	Q5BKT4	Q3UGP8
RefSeq (mRNA)	NM_032834	NM_001033441
RefSeq (protein)	NP_116223	NP_001028613
Location (UCSC)	Chr 12: 34.02 – 34.03 Mb	Chr 15: 90.11 – 90.12 Mb
PubMed search
- Wikidata
View/Edit Human	View/Edit Mouse

Alpha-1,2-glucosyltransferase ALG10-A is an enzyme that in humans is encoded by the ALG10 gene. It is a member of the Dolichyl-P-Glc:Glc2Man9GlcNAc2-PP-dolichol alpha-1,2-glucosyltransferase class of enzymes.

== Function ==
This gene encodes a membrane-associated protein that adds the third glucose residue to the lipid-linked oligosaccharide precursor for N-linked glycosylation. That is, it transfers the terminal glucose from dolichyl phosphate glucose (Dol-P-Glc) onto the lipid-linked oligosaccharide Glc2Man9GlcNAc(2)-PP-Dol. The rat protein homolog was shown to specifically modulate the gating function of the rat neuronal ether-a-go-go (EAG) potassium ion channel.
