= ALG10 (enzyme class) =

Class of enzymes

Dolichyl-P-Glc:Glc2Man9GlcNAc2-PP-dolichol alpha-1,2-glucosyltransferase

Identifiers
- EC no.: 2.4.1.256

Databases
- IntEnz: IntEnz view
- BRENDA: BRENDA entry
- ExPASy: NiceZyme view
- KEGG: KEGG entry
- MetaCyc: metabolic pathway
- PRIAM: profile
- PDB structures: RCSB PDB PDBe PDBsum
Search
- PMC: articles
- PubMed: articles
- NCBI: proteins

Dolichyl-P-Glc:Glc2Man9GlcNAc2-PP-dolichol alpha-1,2-glucosyltransferase (EC 2.4.1.256, ALG10, Dol-P-Glc:Glc2Man9GlcNAc2-PP-Dol alpha-1,2-glucosyltransferase) is an enzyme with systematic name dolichyl beta-D-glucosyl phosphate:D-Glc-alpha-(1->3)-D-Glc-alpha-(1->3)-D-Man-alpha-(1->2)-D-Man-alpha-(1->2)-D-Man-alpha-(1->3)-(D-Man-alpha-(1->2)-D-Man-alpha-(1->3)-(D-Man-alpha-(1->2)-D-Man-alpha-(1->6))-D-Man-alpha-(1->6))-D-Man-beta-(1->4)-D-GlcNAc-beta-(1->4)-D-GlcNAc-diphosphodolichol 2-alpha-D-glucosyltransferase.

This enzyme catalyses the following chemical reaction:

This is the chemical reaction that is mediated by the enzyme Dolichyl-P-Glc:Glc2Man9GlcNAc2-PP-dolichol alpha-1,2-glucosyltransferase

which is:

dolichyl beta-D-glucosyl phosphate + D-Glc-alpha-(1->3)-D-Glc-alpha-(1->3)-D-Man-alpha-(1->2)-D-Man-alpha-(1->2)-D-Man-alpha-(1->3)-[D-Man-alpha-(1->2)-D-Man-alpha-(1->3)-[D-Man-alpha-(1->2)-D-Man-alpha-(1->6)]-D-Man-alpha-(1->6)]-D-Man-beta-(1->4)-D-GlcNAc-beta-(1->4)-D-GlcNAc-diphosphodolichol $\rightleftharpoons$ D-Glc-alpha-(1->2)-D-Glc-alpha-(1->3)-D-Glc-alpha-(1->3)-D-Man-alpha-(1->2)-D-Man-alpha-(1->2)-D-Man-alpha-(1->3)-[D-Man-alpha-(1->2)-D-Man-alpha-(1->3)-[D-Man-alpha-(1->2)-D-Man-alpha-(1->6)]-D-Man-alpha-(1->6)]-D-Man-beta-(1->4)-D-GlcNAc-beta-(1->4)-D-GlcNAc-diphosphodolichol + dolichyl phosphate

This eukaryotic enzyme performs the final step in the synthesis of the lipid-linked oligosaccharide.

== Human proteins associated with this domain ==
- ALG10
- ALG10B
