= Dolichyl-phosphate beta-glucosyltransferase =

Class of enzymes

Identifiers
- EC no.: 2.4.1.117
- CAS no.: 71061-42-2

Databases
- IntEnz: IntEnz view
- BRENDA: BRENDA entry
- ExPASy: NiceZyme view
- KEGG: KEGG entry
- MetaCyc: metabolic pathway
- PRIAM: profile
- PDB structures: RCSB PDB PDBe PDBsum
- Gene Ontology: AmiGO / QuickGO
Search
- PMC: articles
- PubMed: articles
- NCBI: proteins

Dolichyl-phosphate beta-glucosyltransferase (EC 2.4.1.117) is an enzyme that catalyzes the chemical reaction

dolichol monophosphate
+ UDP-glucose
UDP
dolichyl β-D-glucosyl phosphate

The two substrates of this enzyme are dolichol monophosphate and UDP-glucose. Its products are dolichyl β-D-glucosyl phosphate (n=1 in diagram) and uridine diphosphate (UDP).

This enzyme belongs to the family of glycosyltransferases, specifically the hexosyltransferases. The systematic name of this enzyme class is UDP-glucose:dolichyl-phosphate beta-D-glucosyltransferase. Other names in common use include polyprenyl phosphate:UDP-D-glucose glucosyltransferase, UDP-glucose dolichyl-phosphate glucosyltransferase, uridine diphosphoglucose-dolichol glucosyltransferase, UDP-glucose:dolichol phosphate glucosyltransferase, UDP-glucose:dolicholphosphoryl glucosyltransferase, UDP-glucose:dolichyl monophosphate glucosyltransferase, and UDP-glucose:dolichyl phosphate glucosyltransferase.
