= Dolichyl-xylosyl-phosphate—protein xylosyltransferase =

Class of enzymes

dolichyl-xylosyl-phosphate-protein xylosyltransferase

Identifiers
- EC no.: 2.4.2.33

Databases
- IntEnz: IntEnz view
- BRENDA: BRENDA entry
- ExPASy: NiceZyme view
- KEGG: KEGG entry
- MetaCyc: metabolic pathway
- PRIAM: profile
- PDB structures: RCSB PDB PDBe PDBsum
- Gene Ontology: AmiGO / QuickGO
Search
- PMC: articles
- PubMed: articles
- NCBI: proteins

In enzymology, a dolichyl-xylosyl-phosphate-protein xylosyltransferase (EC 2.4.2.33) is an enzyme that catalyzes the chemical reaction

dolichyl D-xylosyl phosphate + protein $\rightleftharpoons$ dolichyl phosphate + D-xylosylprotein

Thus, the two substrates of this enzyme are dolichyl D-xylosyl phosphate and protein, whereas its two products are dolichyl phosphate and D-xylosylprotein.

This enzyme belongs to the family of glycosyltransferases, specifically the pentosyltransferases. The systematic name of this enzyme class is dolichyl-D-xylosyl-phosphate:protein D-xylosyltransferase.
