= Dolichyl-phosphate alpha-N-acetylglucosaminyltransferase =

Class of enzymes

dolichyl-phosphate alpha-N-acetylglucosaminyltransferase

Identifiers
- EC no.: 2.4.1.153
- CAS no.: 63363-73-5

Databases
- IntEnz: IntEnz view
- BRENDA: BRENDA entry
- ExPASy: NiceZyme view
- KEGG: KEGG entry
- MetaCyc: metabolic pathway
- PRIAM: profile
- PDB structures: RCSB PDB PDBe PDBsum
- Gene Ontology: AmiGO / QuickGO
Search
- PMC: articles
- PubMed: articles
- NCBI: proteins

In enzymology, a dolichyl-phosphate alpha-N-acetylglucosaminyltransferase (EC 2.4.1.153) is an enzyme that catalyzes the chemical reaction

UDP-N-acetyl-D-glucosamine + dolichyl phosphate $\rightleftharpoons$ UDP + dolichyl N-acetyl-alpha-D-glucosaminyl phosphate

Thus, the two substrates of this enzyme are UDP-N-acetyl-D-glucosamine and dolichyl phosphate, whereas its two products are UDP and dolichyl N-acetyl-alpha-D-glucosaminyl phosphate.

This enzyme belongs to the family of glycosyltransferases, specifically the hexosyltransferases. The systematic name of this enzyme class is UDP-N-acetyl-D-glucosamine:dolichyl-phosphate alpha-N-acetyl-D-glucosaminyltransferase. Other names in common use include uridine diphosphoacetylglucosamine-dolichol phosphate, acetylglucosaminyltransferase, dolichyl phosphate acetylglucosaminyltransferase, dolichyl phosphate N-acetylglucosaminyltransferase, UDP-N-acetylglucosamine-dolichol phosphate, and N-acetylglucosaminyltransferase.
