= Dolichylphosphate-glucose phosphodiesterase =

dolichylphosphate-glucose phosphodiesterase

Identifiers
- EC no.: 3.1.4.48
- CAS no.: 89287-42-3

Databases
- IntEnz: IntEnz view
- BRENDA: BRENDA entry
- ExPASy: NiceZyme view
- KEGG: KEGG entry
- MetaCyc: metabolic pathway
- PRIAM: profile
- PDB structures: RCSB PDB PDBe PDBsum
- Gene Ontology: AmiGO / QuickGO
Search
- PMC: articles
- PubMed: articles
- NCBI: proteins

The enzyme dolichylphosphate-glucose phosphodiesterase (EC 3.1.4.48) catalyzes the reaction

dolichyl β-D-glucosyl phosphate + H_{2}O $\rightleftharpoons$ dolichyl phosphate + D-glucose

This enzyme belongs to the family of hydrolases, specifically those acting on phosphoric diester bonds. The systematic name is dolichyl-β-D-glucosyl-phosphate dolichylphosphohydrolase. Other names in common use include dolichol phosphoglucose phosphodiesterase, and Dol-P-Glc phosphodiesterase. This enzyme participates in n-glycan biosynthesis.
