= UDP-N-acetylglucosamine—dolichyl-phosphate N-acetylglucosaminephosphotransferase =

Class of enzymes

UDP-N-acetylglucosamine-dolichyl-phosphate N-acetylglucosaminephosphotransferase

Identifiers
- EC no.: 2.7.8.15
- CAS no.: 70431-08-2

Databases
- IntEnz: IntEnz view
- BRENDA: BRENDA entry
- ExPASy: NiceZyme view
- KEGG: KEGG entry
- MetaCyc: metabolic pathway
- PRIAM: profile
- PDB structures: RCSB PDB PDBe PDBsum
- Gene Ontology: AmiGO / QuickGO
Search
- PMC: articles
- PubMed: articles
- NCBI: proteins

In enzymology, an UDP-N-acetylglucosamine—dolichyl-phosphate N-acetylglucosaminephosphotransferase (EC 2.7.8.15) is an enzyme that catalyzes the chemical reaction

UDP-N-acetyl-D-glucosamine + dolichyl phosphate $\rightleftharpoons$ UMP + N-acetyl-D-glucosaminyl-diphosphodolichol

Thus, the two substrates of this enzyme are UDP-N-acetyl-D-glucosamine and dolichyl phosphate, whereas its two products are UMP and N-acetyl-D-glucosaminyl-diphosphodolichol.

This enzyme belongs to the family of transferases, specifically those transferring phosphorus-containing groups transferases for other substituted phosphate groups. The systematic name of this enzyme class is UDP-N-acetyl-D-glucosamine:dolichyl-phosphate N-acetyl-D-glucosaminephosphotransferase. Other names in common use include UDP-D-N-acetylglucosamine N-acetylglucosamine 1-phosphate transferase, UDP-GlcNAc:dolichyl-phosphate GlcNAc-1-phosphate transferase, UDP-N-acetyl-D-glucosamine:dolichol phosphate N-acetyl-D-glucosamine-1-phosphate transferase, uridine diphosphoacetylglucosamine-dolichyl phosphate acetylglucosamine-1-phosphotransferase, chitobiosylpyrophosphoryldolichol synthase, dolichol phosphate N-acetylglucosamine-1-phosphotransferase, UDP-acetylglucosamine-dolichol phosphate acetylglucosamine phosphotransferase, and UDP-acetylglucosamine-dolichol phosphate acetylglucosamine-1-phosphotransferase. This enzyme participates in the biosynthesis of N-glycan and glycan structures.
