= Dolichyl-diphosphate—polyphosphate phosphotransferase =

dolichyl-diphosphate-polyphosphate phosphotransferase

Identifiers
- EC no.: 2.7.4.20
- CAS no.: 94949-27-6

Databases
- IntEnz: IntEnz view
- BRENDA: BRENDA entry
- ExPASy: NiceZyme view
- KEGG: KEGG entry
- MetaCyc: metabolic pathway
- PRIAM: profile
- PDB structures: RCSB PDB PDBe PDBsum
- Gene Ontology: AmiGO / QuickGO
Search
- PMC: articles
- PubMed: articles
- NCBI: proteins

In enzymology, a dolichyl-diphosphate-polyphosphate phosphotransferase (EC 2.7.4.20) is an enzyme that catalyzes the chemical reaction

dolichyl diphosphate + (phosphate)n $\rightleftharpoons$ dolichyl phosphate + (phosphate)n^{+}1

Thus, the two substrates of this enzyme are dolichyl diphosphate and (phosphate)n, whereas its two products are dolichyl phosphate and (phosphate)n+1.

This enzyme belongs to the family of transferases, specifically those transferring phosphorus-containing groups (phosphotransferases) with a phosphate group as acceptor. The systematic name of this enzyme class is dolichyl-diphosphate:polyphosphate phosphotransferase. This enzyme is also called dolichylpyrophosphate:polyphosphate phosphotransferase.
