= Dolichyl-phosphatase =

dolichyl-phosphatase

Identifiers
- EC no.: 3.1.3.51
- CAS no.: 72994-50-4

Databases
- IntEnz: IntEnz view
- BRENDA: BRENDA entry
- ExPASy: NiceZyme view
- KEGG: KEGG entry
- MetaCyc: metabolic pathway
- PRIAM: profile
- PDB structures: RCSB PDB PDBe PDBsum
- Gene Ontology: AmiGO / QuickGO
Search
- PMC: articles
- PubMed: articles
- NCBI: proteins

The enzyme dolichyl-phosphatase (EC 3.1.3.51) catalyzes the reaction

dolichyl phosphate + H_{2}O $\rightleftharpoons$ dolichol + phosphate

This enzyme belongs to the family of hydrolases, to be specific, those acting on phosphoric monoester bonds. The systematic name is dolichyl-phosphate phosphohydrolase. Other names in common use include dolichol phosphate phosphatase, dolichol phosphatase, dolichol monophosphatase, dolichyl monophosphate phosphatase, dolichyl phosphate phosphatase, polyisoprenyl phosphate phosphatase, polyprenylphosphate phosphatase, and Dol-P phosphatase. This enzyme participates in N-linked-glycan biosynthesis.
