= Dolichyl-phosphate D-xylosyltransferase =

Class of enzymes

dolichyl-phosphate D-xylosyltransferase

Identifiers
- EC no.: 2.4.2.32

Databases
- IntEnz: IntEnz view
- BRENDA: BRENDA entry
- ExPASy: NiceZyme view
- KEGG: KEGG entry
- MetaCyc: metabolic pathway
- PRIAM: profile
- PDB structures: RCSB PDB PDBe PDBsum
- Gene Ontology: AmiGO / QuickGO
Search
- PMC: articles
- PubMed: articles
- NCBI: proteins

In enzymology, a dolichyl-phosphate D-xylosyltransferase (EC 2.4.2.32) is an enzyme that catalyzes the chemical reaction

UDP-D-xylose + dolichyl phosphate $\rightleftharpoons$ UDP + dolichyl D-xylosyl phosphate

Thus, the two substrates of this enzyme are UDP-D-xylose and dolichyl phosphate, whereas its two products are UDP and dolichyl D-xylosyl phosphate.

This enzyme belongs to the family of glycosyltransferases, specifically the pentosyltransferases. The systematic name of this enzyme class is UDP-D-xylose:dolichyl-phosphate D-xylosyltransferase.
