= Dolichyl β-D-glucosyl phosphate =

Dolichyl β-d-glucosyl phosphate

Identifiers
CAS Number	55607-88-0
3D model (JSmol)	Interactive image
ChEBI	CHEBI:15812
ChemSpider	24846866
KEGG	C01246
PubChem CID	24892725
- InChI: InChI=1S/C31H55O9P/c1-22(2)11-7-12-23(3)13-8-14-24(4)15-9-16-25(5)17-10-18-26(6)19-20-38-41(36,37)40-31-30(35)29(34)28(33)27(21-32)39-31/h11,13,15,17,26-35H,7-10,12,14,16,18-21H2,1-6H3,(H,36,37)/b23-13+,24-15+,25-17-/t26?,27-,28-,29+,30-,31+/m1/s1 Key: AGLXCEGQRIYVRV-DVDHLLHCSA-N
- SMILES: CC(CC/C=C(/C)\CC/C=C(\C)/CC/C=C(\C)/CCC=C(C)C)CCOP(=O)(O)O[C@H]1[C@@H]([C@H]([C@@H]([C@H](O1)CO)O)O)O

Properties
Chemical formula	C_{26+5n}H_{47+8n}O_{9}P
Molar mass	variable
- Except where otherwise noted, data are given for materials in their standard state (at 25 °C [77 °F], 100 kPa). Infobox references

Dolichyl β-d-glucosyl phosphate is a molecule involved in glycosylation. It is a polyprenyl glycosyl phosphate having dolichol as the polyprenyl component and β-d-glucose as the glycosyl component.

== Biosynthesis ==
Dolichyl-phosphate beta-glucosyltransferase is an enzyme found in liver and calf pancreas that converts dolichol monophosphate to its glucoside. The glucose unit is transferred from UDP-glucose with uridine diphosphate (UDP) as byproduct.

dolichol monophosphate
+ UDP-glucose
UDP
dolichyl β-D-glucosyl phosphate

== See also ==
- Dolichylphosphate-glucose phosphodiesterase
