= N-acetylgalactosamine 4-sulfate 6-O-sulfotransferase =

Enzyme

Identifiers
- EC no.: 2.8.2.33
- CAS no.: 242469-38-1

Databases
- IntEnz: IntEnz view
- BRENDA: BRENDA entry
- ExPASy: NiceZyme view
- KEGG: KEGG entry
- MetaCyc: metabolic pathway
- PRIAM: profile
- PDB structures: RCSB PDB PDBe PDBsum
Search
- PMC: articles
- PubMed: articles
- NCBI: proteins

N-acetylgalactosamine 4-sulfate 6-O-sulfotransferase (EC 2.8.2.33, GalNAc4S-6ST, CHST15 (gene)) is an enzyme with systematic name 3'-phosphoadenylyl-sulfate:(dermatan)-4-O-sulfo-N-acetyl-D-galactosamine 6-O-sulfotransferase. This enzyme catalyses the following chemical reaction

(1) 3-phospho-5-adenylyl sulfate + [dermatan]-4-O-sulfo-N-acetyl-D-galactosamine $\rightleftharpoons$ adenosine 3',5'-bisphosphate + [dermatan]-4,6-di-O-sulfo-N-acetyl-D-galactosamine
(2) 3-phospho-5-adenylyl sulfate + [chondroitin]-4-O-sulfo-N-acetyl-D-galactosamine $\rightleftharpoons$ adenosine 3',5'-bisphosphate + [chondroitin]-4,6-di-O-sulfo-N-acetyl-D-galactosamine

The enzyme is activated by divalent cations and reduced glutathione.

== Human proteins containing this domain ==
- CHST15
