= Carbohydrate sulfotransferase 15 =

Protein-coding gene in the species Homo sapiens

CHST15

Identifiers
- Aliases: CHST15, BRAG, GALNAC4S-6ST, carbohydrate (N-acetylgalactosamine 4-sulfate 6-O) sulfotransferase 15, carbohydrate sulfotransferase 15
- External IDs: OMIM: 608277; MGI: 1924840; GeneCards: CHST15
Enzyme activity
EC #	BRENDA	ExPASy	KEGG	MetaCyc
2.8.2.33	↗	↗	↗	↗

Gene location (Human)
Chr.	Chromosome 10 (human)
Band	10q26.13	Start	124,007,668 bp
Band	10q26.13	End	124,093,598 bp

Gene location (Mouse)
Chr.	Chromosome 7 (mouse)
Band	7|7 F3	Start	131,837,509 bp
Band	7|7 F3	End	131,918,957 bp
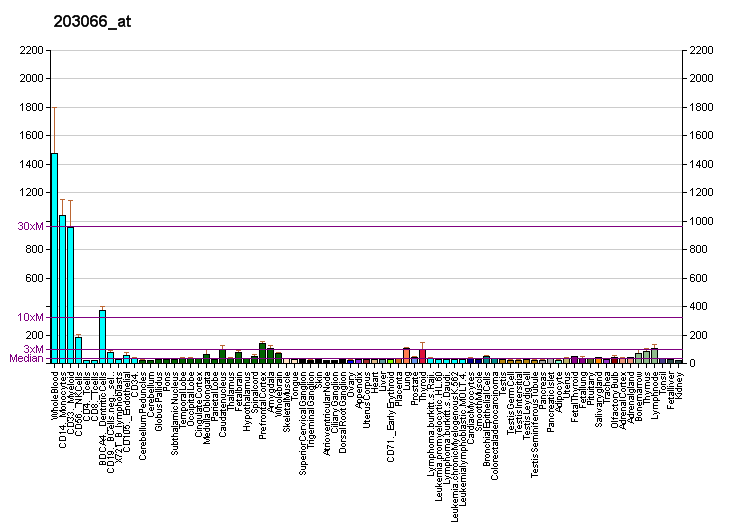
RNA expression pattern
Bgee	Human / Mouse (ortholog); Top expressed in: blood; endothelial cell; secondary oocyte; tibia; monocyte; germinal epithelium; periodontal fiber; visceral pleura; mucosa of paranasal sinus; pericardium / Top expressed in: olfactory tubercle; lumbar spinal ganglion; granulocyte; nucleus accumbens; Region I of hippocampus proper; fossa; condyle; spleen; internal carotid artery; left lung lobe; More reference expression data
BioGPS	More reference expression data
Gene ontology
Molecular function	transferase activity; 3'-phosphoadenosine 5'-phosphosulfate binding; N-acetylgalactosamine 4-sulfate 6-O-sulfotransferase activity
Cellular component	integral component of membrane; Golgi membrane; Golgi apparatus; membrane
Biological process	chondroitin sulfate biosynthetic process; hexose biosynthetic process
Sources:Amigo / QuickGO
Orthologs
Databases	NCBI: entry; OMA: entry
Species	Human	Mouse
Entrez	51363	77590
Ensembl	ENSG00000182022	ENSMUSG00000030930
UniProt	Q7LFX5	Q91XQ5
RefSeq (mRNA)	NM_001270764; NM_001270765; NM_014863; NM_015892	NM_029935; NM_001360768
RefSeq (protein)	NP_001257693; NP_001257694; NP_055678; NP_056976	NP_084211; NP_001347697
Location (UCSC)	Chr 10: 124.01 – 124.09 Mb	Chr 7: 131.84 – 131.92 Mb
PubMed search
- Wikidata
View/Edit Human	View/Edit Mouse

Carbohydrate sulfotransferase 15 is an enzyme that in humans is encoded by the CHST15 gene. It belongs to the N-acetylgalactosamine 4-sulfate 6-O-sulfotransferase enzyme class.
