= FEMB =

FEMB may refer to:

- N-acetylmuramoyl-L-alanyl-D-glutamyl-L-lysyl-(N6-triglycine)-D-alanyl-D-alanine-diphosphoundecaprenyl-N-acetylglucosamine:glycine glycyltransferase
- Front-end motherboard
