= N-acetylneuraminylgalactosylglucosylceramide b-1,4-N-acetylgalactosaminyltransferase =

Class of enzymes

N-acetylneuraminylgalactosylglucosylceramide beta-1,4-N-acetylgalactosaminyltransferase

Identifiers
- EC no.: 2.4.1.165
- CAS no.: 109136-50-7

Databases
- IntEnz: IntEnz view
- BRENDA: BRENDA entry
- ExPASy: NiceZyme view
- KEGG: KEGG entry
- MetaCyc: metabolic pathway
- PRIAM: profile
- PDB structures: RCSB PDB PDBe PDBsum
Search
- PMC: articles
- PubMed: articles
- NCBI: proteins

N-acetylneuraminylgalactosylglucosylceramide beta-1,4-N-acetylgalactosaminyltransferase (EC 2.4.1.165, is an enzyme that catalyses the following chemical reaction:

UDP-N-acetyl-D-galactosamine + N-acetylneuraminyl-(2->3)-alpha-D-galactosyl-(1->4)-beta-D-glucosyl-(1<->1)-ceramide $\rightleftharpoons$ UDP + N-acetyl-D-galactosaminyl-(1->4)-beta-N-acetylneuraminyl-(2->3)-alpha-D-galactosyl-(1->4)-beta-D-glucosyl-(1<->1)-ceramide

This enzyme requires Mn^{2+}.

== Nomenclature ==
This enzyme is also known as uridine diphosphoacetylgalactosamine-acetylneuraminyl(alpha2->3)galactosyl(beta1->4)glucosyl beta1->4-acetylgalactosaminyltransferase, UDP-N-acetyl-D-galactosamine:N-acetylneuraminyl-2,3-alpha-D-galactosyl-1,4-beta-D-glucosylceramide beta-1,4-N-acetylgalactosaminyltransferase) with systematic name UDP-N-acetyl-D-galactosamine:N-acetylneuraminyl-(2->3)-alpha-D-galactosyl-(1->4)-beta-D-glucosyl-(1<->1)-ceramide 4-beta-N-acetylgalactosaminyltransferase.
