= Galactofuranosylgalactofuranosylrhamnosyl-N-acetylglucosaminyl-diphospho-decaprenol beta-1,5/1,6-galactofuranosyltransferase =

Class of enzymes

Identifiers
- EC no.: 2.4.1.288

Databases
- IntEnz: IntEnz view
- BRENDA: BRENDA entry
- ExPASy: NiceZyme view
- KEGG: KEGG entry
- MetaCyc: metabolic pathway
- PRIAM: profile
- PDB structures: RCSB PDB PDBe PDBsum
Search
- PMC: articles
- PubMed: articles
- NCBI: proteins

Galactofuranosylgalactofuranosylrhamnosyl-N-acetylglucosaminyl-diphospho-decaprenol beta-1,5/1,6-galactofuranosyltransferase (EC 2.4.1.288, GlfT2) is an enzyme with systematic name UDP-alpha-D-galactofuranose:beta-D-galactofuranosyl-(1->5)-beta-D-galactofuranosyl-(1->4)-alpha-L-rhamnopyranosyl-(1->3)-N-acetyl-alpha-D-glucosaminyl-diphospho-trans,octacis-decaprenol 4-beta/5-beta-D-galactofuranosyltransferase. This enzyme catalyses the following chemical reaction

28 UDP-alpha-D-galactofuranose + beta-D-galactofuranosyl-(1->5)-beta-D-galactofuranosyl-(1->4)-alpha-L-rhamnopyranosyl-(1->3)-N-acetyl-alpha-D-glucosaminyl-diphospho-trans,octacis-decaprenol $\rightleftharpoons$ 28 UDP + [beta-D-galactofuranosyl-(1->5)-beta-D-galactofuranosyl-(1->6)]14-beta-D-galactofuranosyl-(1->5)-beta-D-galactofuranosyl-(1->4)-alpha-L-rhamnopyranosyl-(1->3)-N-acetyl-alpha-D-glucosaminyl-diphospho-trans,octacis-decaprenol

This enzyme is isolated from Mycobacterium tuberculosis.
