= Glucuronylgalactosylproteoglycan 4-b-N-acetylgalactosaminyltransferase =

Class of enzymes

Glucuronylgalactosylproteoglycan 4-beta-N-acetylgalactosaminyltransferase

Identifiers
- EC no.: 2.4.1.174
- CAS no.: 96189-39-8

Databases
- IntEnz: IntEnz view
- BRENDA: BRENDA entry
- ExPASy: NiceZyme view
- KEGG: KEGG entry
- MetaCyc: metabolic pathway
- PRIAM: profile
- PDB structures: RCSB PDB PDBe PDBsum
Search
- PMC: articles
- PubMed: articles
- NCBI: proteins

Glucuronylgalactosylproteoglycan 4-beta-N-acetylgalactosaminyltransferase (EC 2.4.1.174, N-acetylgalactosaminyltransferase I, glucuronylgalactosylproteoglycan beta-1,4-N-acetylgalactosaminyltransferase, uridine diphosphoacetylgalactosamine-chondroitin acetylgalactosaminyltransferase I, UDP-N-acetyl-D-galactosamine:D-glucuronyl-1,3-beta-D-galactosyl-proteoglycan beta-1,4-N-acetylgalactosaminyltransferase) is an enzyme with systematic name UDP-N-acetyl-D-galactosamine:D-glucuronyl-(1->3)-beta-D-galactosyl-proteoglycan 4-beta-N-acetylgalactosaminyltransferase. This enzyme catalyses the following chemical reaction

UDP-N-acetyl-D-galactosamine + beta-D-glucuronyl-(1->3)-D-galactosyl-proteoglycan $\rightleftharpoons$ UDP + N-acetyl-D-galactosaminyl-(1->4)-beta-D-glucuronyl-(1->3)-beta-D-galactosylproteoglycan

This enzyme requires Mn^{2+}.
