= Methanol—5-hydroxybenzimidazolylcobamide Co-methyltransferase =

methanol-5-hydroxybenzimidazolylcobamide Co-methyltransferase

Identifiers
- EC no.: 2.1.1.90
- CAS no.: 86611-98-5

Databases
- IntEnz: IntEnz view
- BRENDA: BRENDA entry
- ExPASy: NiceZyme view
- KEGG: KEGG entry
- MetaCyc: metabolic pathway
- PRIAM: profile
- PDB structures: RCSB PDB PDBe PDBsum
- Gene Ontology: AmiGO / QuickGO
Search
- PMC: articles
- PubMed: articles
- NCBI: proteins

In enzymology, a methanol-5-hydroxybenzimidazolylcobamide Co-methyltransferase (EC 2.1.1.90) is an enzyme that catalyzes the chemical reaction

methanol + 5-hydroxybenzimidazolylcobamide $\rightleftharpoons$ Co-methyl-Co-5-hydroxybenzimidazolylcob(I)amide + H_{2}O

Thus, the two substrates of this enzyme are methanol and 5-hydroxybenzimidazolylcobamide, whereas its two products are Co-methyl-Co-5-hydroxybenzimidazolylcob(I)amide and H_{2}O.

This enzyme belongs to the family of transferases, specifically those transferring one-carbon group methyltransferases. The systematic name of this enzyme class is methanol:5-hydroxybenzimidazolylcobamide Co-methyltransferase. Other names in common use include methanol cobalamin methyltransferase, methanol:5-hydroxybenzimidazolylcobamide methyltransferase, and MT 1.

== Structural studies ==
As of late 2007, only one structure has been solved for this class of enzymes, with the PDB accession code 2I2X.
