= TRNA (guanine10-N2)-dimethyltransferase =

TRNA (guanine^{10}-N^{2})-dimethyltransferase

Identifiers
- EC no.: 2.1.1.213

Databases
- IntEnz: IntEnz view
- BRENDA: BRENDA entry
- ExPASy: NiceZyme view
- KEGG: KEGG entry
- MetaCyc: metabolic pathway
- PRIAM: profile
- PDB structures: RCSB PDB PDBe PDBsum
Search
- PMC: articles
- PubMed: articles
- NCBI: proteins

TRNA (guanine^{10}-N^{2})-dimethyltransferase (EC 2.1.1.213, PAB1283, N(2),N(2)-dimethylguanosine tRNA methyltransferase, Trm-G10, PabTrm-G10, PabTrm-m2 2G10 enzyme) is an enzyme with systematic name S-adenosyl-L-methionine:tRNA (guanine^{10}-N^{2})-dimethyltransferase. This enzyme catalyses the following chemical reaction

2 S-adenosyl-L-methionine + guanine^{10} in tRNA $\rightleftharpoons$ 2 S-adenosyl-L-homocysteine + N^{2}-dimethylguanine^{10} in tRNA (overall reaction)
(1a) S-adenosyl-L-methionine + guanine^{10} in tRNA $\rightleftharpoons$ S-adenosyl-L-homocysteine + N^{2}-methylguanine^{10} in tRNA
(1b) S-adenosyl-L-methionine + N^{2}-methylguanine^{10} in tRNA $\rightleftharpoons$ S-adenosyl-L-homocysteine + N^{2}-dimethylguanine^{10} in tRNA
