= Lactotriaosylceramide beta-1,4-galactosyltransferase =

Class of enzymes

Identifiers
- EC no.: 2.4.1.275

Databases
- IntEnz: IntEnz view
- BRENDA: BRENDA entry
- ExPASy: NiceZyme view
- KEGG: KEGG entry
- MetaCyc: metabolic pathway
- PRIAM: profile
- PDB structures: RCSB PDB PDBe PDBsum
Search
- PMC: articles
- PubMed: articles
- NCBI: proteins

Lactotriaosylceramide beta-1,4-galactosyltransferase (EC 2.4.1.275, beta4Gal-T4, UDP-galactose:N-acetyl-beta-D-glucosaminyl-(1->3)-beta-D-galactosyl-(1->4)-beta-D-glucosyl-(1<->1)-ceramide beta-1,4-galactosyltransferase) is an enzyme with systematic name UDP-alpha-D-galactose:N-acetyl-beta-D-glucosaminyl-(1->3)-beta-D-galactosyl-(1->4)-beta-D-glucosyl-(1<->1)-ceramide 4-beta-D-galactosyltransferase. This enzyme catalyses the following chemical reaction

UDP-alpha-D-galactose + N-acetyl-beta-D-glucosaminyl-(1->3)-beta-D-galactosyl-(1->4)-beta-D-glucosyl-(1<->1)-ceramide $\rightleftharpoons$ UDP + beta-D-galactosyl-(1->4)-N-acetyl-beta-D-galactosaminyl-(1->3)-beta-D-galactosyl-(1->4)-beta-D-glucosyl-(1<->1)-ceramide
