= CDP-L-myo-inositol myo-inositolphosphotransferase =

Identifiers
- EC no.: 2.7.8.34

Databases
- IntEnz: IntEnz view
- BRENDA: BRENDA entry
- ExPASy: NiceZyme view
- KEGG: KEGG entry
- MetaCyc: metabolic pathway
- PRIAM: profile
- PDB structures: RCSB PDB PDBe PDBsum
Search
- PMC: articles
- PubMed: articles
- NCBI: proteins

CDP-L-myo-inositol myo-inositolphosphotransferase (EC 2.7.8.34, CDP-inositol:inositol-1-phosphate transferase (bifunctional CTP:inositol-1-phosphate cytidylyltransferase/CDP-inositol:inositol-1-phosphate transferase (IPCT/DIPPS)), DIPPS (bifunctional CTP:inositol-1-phosphate cytidylyltransferase/CDP-inositol:inositol-1-phosphate transferase (IPCT/DIPPS))) is an enzyme with systematic name CDP-1L-myo-inositol:1L-myo-inositol 1-phosphate myo-inositolphosphotransferase. This enzyme catalyses the following chemical reaction

CDP-1L-myo-inositol + 1L-myo-inositol 1-phosphate $\rightleftharpoons$ CMP + bis(1L-myo-inositol) 3,1'-phosphate 1-phosphate

The enzyme is involved in biosynthesis of bis(1L-myo-inositol) 1,3-phosphate.
