= 1L-myo-inositol 1-phosphate cytidylyltransferase =

Enzyme

Identifiers
- EC no.: 2.7.7.74

Databases
- IntEnz: IntEnz view
- BRENDA: BRENDA entry
- ExPASy: NiceZyme view
- KEGG: KEGG entry
- MetaCyc: metabolic pathway
- PRIAM: profile
- PDB structures: RCSB PDB PDBe PDBsum
Search
- PMC: articles
- PubMed: articles
- NCBI: proteins

1L-myo-inositol 1-phosphate cytidylyltransferase (EC 2.7.7.74, CTP:inositol-1-phosphate cytidylyltransferase (bifunctional CTP:inositol-1-phosphate cytidylyltransferase/CDP-inositol:inositol-1-phosphate transferase (IPCT/DIPPS)), IPCT (bifunctional CTP:inositol-1-phosphate cytidylyltransferase/CDP-inositol:inositol-1-phosphate transferase (IPCT/DIPPS)), L-myo-inositol-1-phosphate cytidylyltransferase) is an enzyme with systematic name CTP:1L-myo-inositol 1-phosphate cytidylyltransferase. This enzyme catalyses the following chemical reaction

CTP + 1L-myo-inositol 1-phosphate $\rightleftharpoons$ diphosphate + CDP-1L-myo-inositol

This enzyme is involved in biosynthesis of bis(1L-myo-inositol) 1,3'-phosphate.
