= TRNA-uridine aminocarboxypropyltransferase =

Class of enzymes

tRNA-uridine aminocarboxypropyltransferase

Identifiers
- EC no.: 2.5.1.25

Databases
- IntEnz: IntEnz view
- BRENDA: BRENDA entry
- ExPASy: NiceZyme view
- KEGG: KEGG entry
- MetaCyc: metabolic pathway
- PRIAM: profile
- PDB structures: RCSB PDB PDBe PDBsum
- Gene Ontology: AmiGO / QuickGO
Search
- PMC: articles
- PubMed: articles
- NCBI: proteins

In enzymology, a tRNA-uridine aminocarboxypropyltransferase (EC 2.5.1.25) is an enzyme that catalyzes the chemical reaction

S-adenosyl-L-methionine + tRNA uridine $\rightleftharpoons$ 5'-methylthioadenosine + tRNA 3-(3-amino-3-carboxypropyl)-uridine

Thus, the two substrates of this enzyme are S-adenosyl-L-methionine and tRNA uridine, whereas its two products are 5'-methylthioadenosine and tRNA 3-(3-amino-3-carboxypropyl)-uridine.

This enzyme belongs to the family of transferases, specifically those transferring aryl or alkyl groups other than methyl groups. The systematic name of this enzyme class is S-adenosyl-L-methionine:tRNA-uridine 3-(3-amino-3-carboxypropyl)transferase.
