= TRNA sulfurtransferase =

Class of enzymes

tRNA sulfurtransferase

Identifiers
- EC no.: 2.8.1.4
- CAS no.: 9055-57-6

Databases
- IntEnz: IntEnz view
- BRENDA: BRENDA entry
- ExPASy: NiceZyme view
- KEGG: KEGG entry
- MetaCyc: metabolic pathway
- PRIAM: profile
- PDB structures: RCSB PDB PDBe PDBsum
- Gene Ontology: AmiGO / QuickGO
Search
- PMC: articles
- PubMed: articles
- NCBI: proteins

In enzymology, a tRNA sulfurtransferase (EC 2.8.1.4) is an enzyme that catalyzes the chemical reaction

L-cysteine + 'activated' tRNA $\rightleftharpoons$ L-serine + tRNA containing a thionucleotide

Thus, the two substrates of this enzyme are L-cysteine and 'activated' tRNA, whereas its two products are L-serine and tRNA containing a thionucleotide.

This enzyme belongs to the family of transferases, specifically the sulfurtransferases, which transfer sulfur-containing groups. The systematic name of this enzyme class is L-cysteine:tRNA sulfurtransferase. Other names in common use include transfer ribonucleate sulfurtransferase, RNA sulfurtransferase, ribonucleate sulfurtransferase, transfer RNA sulfurtransferase, and transfer RNA thiolase.
