= 5-hydroxypentanoate CoA-transferase =

Class of enzymes

Identifiers
- EC no.: 2.8.3.14
- CAS no.: 111684-68-5

Databases
- IntEnz: IntEnz view
- BRENDA: BRENDA entry
- ExPASy: NiceZyme view
- KEGG: KEGG entry
- MetaCyc: metabolic pathway
- PRIAM: profile
- PDB structures: RCSB PDB PDBe PDBsum
- Gene Ontology: AmiGO / QuickGO
Search
- PMC: articles
- PubMed: articles
- NCBI: proteins

In enzymology, a 5-hydroxypentanoate CoA-transferase (EC 2.8.3.14) is an enzyme that catalyzes the chemical reaction

acetyl-CoA + 5-hydroxypentanoate $\rightleftharpoons$ acetate + 5-hydroxypentanoyl-CoA

Thus, the two substrates of this enzyme are acetyl-CoA and 5-hydroxypentanoate, whereas its two products are acetate and 5-hydroxypentanoyl-CoA.

This enzyme belongs to the family of transferases, specifically the CoA-transferases. The systematic name of this enzyme class is acetyl-CoA:5-hydroxypentanoate CoA-transferase. Other names in common use include 5-hydroxyvalerate CoA-transferase, and 5-hydroxyvalerate coenzyme A transferase.
