= CDP-archaeol synthase =

Enzyme

Identifiers
- EC no.: 2.7.7.67
- CAS no.: 329791-09-5

Databases
- IntEnz: IntEnz view
- BRENDA: BRENDA entry
- ExPASy: NiceZyme view
- KEGG: KEGG entry
- MetaCyc: metabolic pathway
- PRIAM: profile
- PDB structures: RCSB PDB PDBe PDBsum
Search
- PMC: articles
- PubMed: articles
- NCBI: proteins

CDP-archaeol synthase (EC 2.7.7.67, CDP-2,3-di-O-geranylgeranyl-sn-glycerol synthase, CTP:2,3-GG-GP ether cytidylyltransferase, CTP:2,3-di-O-geranylgeranyl-sn-glycero-1-phosphate cytidyltransferase) is an enzyme with systematic name CTP:2,3-bis-O-(geranylgeranyl)-sn-glycero-1-phosphate cytidylyltransferase. This enzyme catalyses the following chemical reaction

CTP + 2,3-bis-O-(geranylgeranyl)-sn-glycero-1-phosphate $\rightleftharpoons$ diphosphate + CDP-2,3-bis-O-(geranylgeranyl)-sn-glycerol

This enzyme catalyses one of the steps in the biosynthesis of polar lipids in Archaea.
