= DTDP-dihydrostreptose—streptidine-6-phosphate dihydrostreptosyltransferase =

Class of enzymes

DTDP-dihydrostreptose---streptidine-6-phosphate dihydrostreptosyltransferase

Identifiers
- EC no.: 2.4.2.27
- CAS no.: 73699-20-4

Databases
- IntEnz: IntEnz view
- BRENDA: BRENDA entry
- ExPASy: NiceZyme view
- KEGG: KEGG entry
- MetaCyc: metabolic pathway
- PRIAM: profile
- PDB structures: RCSB PDB PDBe PDBsum
Search
- PMC: articles
- PubMed: articles
- NCBI: proteins

DTDP-dihydrostreptose---streptidine-6-phosphate dihydrostreptosyltransferase (EC 2.4.2.27, thymidine diphosphodihydrostreptose-streptidine 6-phosphate dihydrostreptosyltransferase) is an enzyme with systematic name dTDP-L-dihydrostreptose:streptidine-6-phosphate dihydrostreptosyltransferase. This enzyme catalyses the following chemical reaction

dTDP-L-dihydrostreptose + streptidine 6-phosphate $\rightleftharpoons$ dTDP + O-(1->4)-alpha-L-dihydrostreptosyl-streptidine 6-phosphate
