= UDP-4-amino-4,6-dideoxy-N-acetyl-alpha-D-glucosamine N-acetyltransferase =

Identifiers
- EC no.: 2.3.1.203

Databases
- IntEnz: IntEnz view
- BRENDA: BRENDA entry
- ExPASy: NiceZyme view
- KEGG: KEGG entry
- MetaCyc: metabolic pathway
- PRIAM: profile
- PDB structures: RCSB PDB PDBe PDBsum
Search
- PMC: articles
- PubMed: articles
- NCBI: proteins

UDP-4-amino-4,6-dideoxy-N-acetyl-alpha-D-glucosamine N-acetyltransferase (EC 2.3.1.203, PGLD) is an enzyme with systematic name acetyl-CoA:UDP-4-amino-4,6-dideoxy-N-acetyl-alpha-D-glucosamine N-acetyltransferase. This enzyme catalyses the following chemical reaction

acetyl-CoA + UDP-4-amino-4,6-dideoxy-N-acetyl-alpha-D-glucosamine $\rightleftharpoons$ CoA + UDP-N,N'-diacetylbacillosamine

UDP-N,N'-diacetylbacillosamine is an intermediate in protein glycosylation pathways in several bacterial species.
