= 3-O-alpha-D-mannopyranosyl-alpha-D-mannopyranose xylosylphosphotransferase =

Class of enzymes

Identifiers
- EC no.: 2.7.8.32

Databases
- IntEnz: IntEnz view
- BRENDA: BRENDA entry
- ExPASy: NiceZyme view
- KEGG: KEGG entry
- MetaCyc: metabolic pathway
- PRIAM: profile
- PDB structures: RCSB PDB PDBe PDBsum
Search
- PMC: articles
- PubMed: articles
- NCBI: proteins

3-O-alpha-D-mannopyranosyl-alpha-D-mannopyranose xylosylphosphotransferase (EC 2.7.8.32, XPT1) is an enzyme with systematic name UDP-D-xylose:3-O-alpha-D-mannopyranosyl-alpha-D-mannopyranose xylosylphosphotransferase. This enzyme catalyses the following chemical reaction

UDP-xylose + 3-O-alpha-D-mannopyranosyl-alpha-D-mannopyranose $\rightleftharpoons$ UMP + 3-O-(6-O-alpha-D-xylosylphospho-alpha-D-mannopyranosyl)-alpha-D-mannopyranose

Mn^{2+} required for activity.
