= UDP-4-amino-4,6-dideoxy-N-acetyl-beta-L-altrosamine N-acetyltransferase =

Identifiers
- EC no.: 2.3.1.202

Databases
- IntEnz: IntEnz view
- BRENDA: BRENDA entry
- ExPASy: NiceZyme view
- KEGG: KEGG entry
- MetaCyc: metabolic pathway
- PRIAM: profile
- PDB structures: RCSB PDB PDBe PDBsum
Search
- PMC: articles
- PubMed: articles
- NCBI: proteins

UDP-4-amino-4,6-dideoxy-N-acetyl-beta-L-altrosamine N-acetyltransferase (EC 2.3.1.202, PseH) is an enzyme with systematic name acetyl-CoA:UDP-4-amino-4,6-dideoxy-N-acetyl-beta-L-altrosamine N-acetyltransferase. This enzyme catalyses the following chemical reaction

acetyl-CoA + UDP-4-amino-4,6-dideoxy-N-acetyl-beta-L-altrosamine $\rightleftharpoons$ CoA + UDP-2,4-bis(acetamido)-2,4,6-trideoxy-beta-L-altropyranose

This enzyme is isolated from Helicobacter pylori.
