= Fas-activated serine/threonine kinase =

Class of enzymes

Identifiers
- EC no.: 2.7.11.8

Databases
- IntEnz: IntEnz view
- BRENDA: BRENDA entry
- ExPASy: NiceZyme view
- KEGG: KEGG entry
- MetaCyc: metabolic pathway
- PRIAM: profile
- PDB structures: RCSB PDB PDBe PDBsum
Search
- PMC: articles
- PubMed: articles
- NCBI: proteins

In enzymology, a Fas-activated serine/threonine kinase (EC 2.7.11.8) is an enzyme that catalyzes the chemical reaction

ATP + [Fas-activated serine/threonine protein] $\rightleftharpoons$ ADP + [Fas-activated serine/threonine phosphoprotein]

Thus, the two substrates of this enzyme are ATP and Fas-activated serine/threonine protein, whereas its two products are ADP and Fas-activated serine/threonine phosphoprotein.

This enzyme belongs to the family of transferases, specifically those transferring phosphorus-containing groups protein-serine/threonine kinases. The systematic name of this enzyme class is ATP:[Fas-activated serine/threonine protein] phosphotransferase. Other names in common use include FAST, FASTK, and STK10.
