= Soyasapogenol B glucuronide galactosyltransferase =

Class of enzymes

Identifiers
- EC no.: 2.4.1.272

Databases
- IntEnz: IntEnz view
- BRENDA: BRENDA entry
- ExPASy: NiceZyme view
- KEGG: KEGG entry
- MetaCyc: metabolic pathway
- PRIAM: profile
- PDB structures: RCSB PDB PDBe PDBsum
Search
- PMC: articles
- PubMed: articles
- NCBI: proteins

Soyasapogenol B glucuronide galactosyltransferase (EC 2.4.1.272, UDP-galactose:SBMG-galactosyltransferase, UGT73P2, GmSGT2 (gene), UDP-galactose:soyasapogenol B 3-O-glucuronide beta-D-galactosyltransferase) is an enzyme with systematic name UDP-alpha-D-galactose:soyasapogenol B 3-O-glucuronide beta-D-galactosyltransferase. This enzyme catalyses the following chemical reaction

UDP-alpha-D-galactose + soyasapogenol B 3-O-beta-D-glucuronide $\rightleftharpoons$ UDP + soyasaponin III

This enzyme takes part of the biosynthetic pathway for soyasaponins.
