= Pseudaminic acid cytidylyltransferase =

Identifiers
- EC no.: 2.7.7.81

Databases
- IntEnz: IntEnz view
- BRENDA: BRENDA entry
- ExPASy: NiceZyme view
- KEGG: KEGG entry
- MetaCyc: metabolic pathway
- PRIAM: profile
- PDB structures: RCSB PDB PDBe PDBsum
Search
- PMC: articles
- PubMed: articles
- NCBI: proteins

Pseudaminic acid cytidylyltransferase (EC 2.7.7.81, PseF) is an enzyme with systematic name CTP:5,7-diacetamido-3,5,7,9-tetradeoxy-L-glycero-alpha-L-manno-nonulosonic acid cytidylyltransferase. This enzyme catalyses the following chemical reaction

CTP + 5,7-bis(acetylamino)-3,5,7,9-tetradeoxy-L-glycero-alpha-L-manno-2-nonulopyranosonic acid $\rightleftharpoons$ diphosphate + CMP-5,7-bis(acetylamino)-3,5,7,9-tetradeoxy-L-glycero-alpha-L-manno-2-nonulopyranosonic acid

Mg^{2+} is required for activity.
