= Citrate CoA-transferase =

Class of enzymes

citrate CoA-transferase

Identifiers
- EC no.: 2.8.3.10
- CAS no.: 65187-14-6

Databases
- IntEnz: IntEnz view
- BRENDA: BRENDA entry
- ExPASy: NiceZyme view
- KEGG: KEGG entry
- MetaCyc: metabolic pathway
- PRIAM: profile
- PDB structures: RCSB PDB PDBe PDBsum
- Gene Ontology: AmiGO / QuickGO
Search
- PMC: articles
- PubMed: articles
- NCBI: proteins

In enzymology, a citrate CoA-transferase (EC 2.8.3.10) is an enzyme that catalyzes the following chemical reaction:

acetyl-CoA + citrate $\rightleftharpoons$ acetate + (3S)-citryl-CoA

Thus, the two substrates of this enzyme are acetyl-CoA and citrate, whereas its two products are acetate and (3S)-citryl-CoA.

This enzyme belongs to the family of transferases, specifically the CoA-transferases. The systematic name of this enzyme class is acetyl-CoA:citrate CoA-transferase. This enzyme participates in citrate cycle (tca cycle).
