= Glycosyltransferase DesVII =

Class of enzymes

Identifiers
- EC no.: 2.4.1.277

Databases
- IntEnz: IntEnz view
- BRENDA: BRENDA entry
- ExPASy: NiceZyme view
- KEGG: KEGG entry
- MetaCyc: metabolic pathway
- PRIAM: profile
- PDB structures: RCSB PDB PDBe PDBsum
Search
- PMC: articles
- PubMed: articles
- NCBI: proteins

Glycosyltransferase DesVII (EC 2.4.1.277, DesVII) is an enzyme with systematic name dTDP-3-dimethylamino-3,4,6-trideoxy-alpha-D-glucopyranose:10-deoxymethynolide 3-dimethylamino-4,6-dideoxy-alpha-D-glucosyltransferase. This enzyme catalyses the following chemical reaction

dTDP-3-dimethylamino-3,4,6-trideoxy-alpha-D-glucopyranose + 10-deoxymethynolide $\rightleftharpoons$ dTDP + 10-deoxymethymycin

DesVII is the glycosyltransferase responsible for the attachment of TDP-D-desosamine to macrolactones of varied ring sizes.
