= DATP(dGTP)—DNA purinetransferase =

dATP(dGTP)—DNA purinetransferase

Identifiers
- EC no.: 2.6.99.1

Databases
- IntEnz: IntEnz view
- BRENDA: BRENDA entry
- ExPASy: NiceZyme view
- KEGG: KEGG entry
- MetaCyc: metabolic pathway
- PRIAM: profile
- PDB structures: RCSB PDB PDBe PDBsum
Search
- PMC: articles
- PubMed: articles
- NCBI: proteins

dATP(dGTP)—DNA purinetransferase (EC 2.6.99.1) is an enzyme with systematic name dATP(dGTP):depurinated-DNA purine transferase. This enzyme catalyses the following chemical reaction

(1) dATP + depurinated DNA $\rightleftharpoons$ deoxyribose triphosphate + DNA
(2) dGTP + depurinated DNA $\rightleftharpoons$ deoxyribose triphosphate + DNA

The purine residue is transferred on to the apurinic site forming a normal glycosylic bond.
