= O-phospho-L-seryl-tRNA:Cys-tRNA synthase =

Identifiers
- EC no.: 2.5.1.73
- CAS no.: 1239229-21-0

Databases
- IntEnz: IntEnz view
- BRENDA: BRENDA entry
- ExPASy: NiceZyme view
- KEGG: KEGG entry
- MetaCyc: metabolic pathway
- PRIAM: profile
- PDB structures: RCSB PDB PDBe PDBsum
Search
- PMC: articles
- PubMed: articles
- NCBI: proteins

O-phospho-L-seryl-tRNA:Cys-tRNA synthase (EC 2.5.1.73, SepCysS, Sep-tRNA:Cys-tRNA synthase) is an enzyme with systematic name O-phospho-L-seryl-tRNACys:hydrogen sulfide 2-aminopropanoate transferase. This enzyme catalyses the following chemical reaction

O-phospho-L-seryl-tRNACys + sulfide $\rightleftharpoons$ L-cysteinyl-tRNACys + phosphate
