= Soyasaponin III rhamnosyltransferase =

Class of enzymes

Identifiers
- EC no.: 2.4.1.273

Databases
- IntEnz: IntEnz view
- BRENDA: BRENDA entry
- ExPASy: NiceZyme view
- KEGG: KEGG entry
- MetaCyc: metabolic pathway
- PRIAM: profile
- PDB structures: RCSB PDB PDBe PDBsum
Search
- PMC: articles
- PubMed: articles
- NCBI: proteins

Soyasaponin III rhamnosyltransferase (EC 2.4.1.273, UGT91H4, GmSGT3 (gene)) is an enzyme with systematic name UDP-rhamnose:soyasaponin III rhamnosyltransferase. This enzyme catalyses the following chemical reaction:

UDP-rhamnose + soyasaponin III $\rightleftharpoons$ UDP + soyasaponin I

Part of the biosynthetic pathway for soyasaponins.
