= 1,2-diacylglycerol 3-glucosyltransferase =

Class of enzymes

Identifiers
- EC no.: 2.4.1.157
- CAS no.: 83744-96-1

Databases
- IntEnz: IntEnz view
- BRENDA: BRENDA entry
- ExPASy: NiceZyme view
- KEGG: KEGG entry
- MetaCyc: metabolic pathway
- PRIAM: profile
- PDB structures: RCSB PDB PDBe PDBsum
- Gene Ontology: AmiGO / QuickGO
Search
- PMC: articles
- PubMed: articles
- NCBI: proteins

In enzymology, a 1,2-diacylglycerol 3-glucosyltransferase (EC 2.4.1.157) is an enzyme that catalyzes the chemical reaction

UDP-glucose + 1,2-diacylglycerol $\rightleftharpoons$ UDP + 3-D-glucosyl-1,2-diacylglycerol

Thus, the two substrates of this enzyme are UDP-glucose and 1,2-diacylglycerol, whereas its two products are UDP and 3-D-glucosyl-1,2-diacylglycerol.

This enzyme belongs to the family of glycosyltransferases, specifically the hexosyltransferases. The systematic name of this enzyme class is UDP-glucose:1,2-diacylglycerol 3-D-glucosyltransferase. Other names in common use include UDP-glucose:diacylglycerol glucosyltransferase, UDP-glucose:1,2-diacylglycerol glucosyltransferase, uridine diphosphoglucose-diacylglycerol glucosyltransferase, and UDP-glucose-diacylglycerol glucosyltransferase. This enzyme participates in glycerolipid metabolism.
