= Cinnamate beta-D-glucosyltransferase =

Enzyme

Identifiers
- EC no.: 2.4.1.177
- CAS no.: 83744-95-0

Databases
- IntEnz: IntEnz view
- BRENDA: BRENDA entry
- ExPASy: NiceZyme view
- KEGG: KEGG entry
- MetaCyc: metabolic pathway
- PRIAM: profile
- PDB structures: RCSB PDB PDBe PDBsum
- Gene Ontology: AmiGO / QuickGO
Search
- PMC: articles
- PubMed: articles
- NCBI: proteins

Cinnamate beta-D-glucosyltransferase (EC 2.4.1.177) is an enzyme that catalyzes the chemical reaction

cinnamic acid
+ UDP-glucose
UDP
1-O-trans-cinnamoyl-β-D-glucopyranose

The two substrates of this enzyme characterised from sweet potato are cinnamic acid and UDP-glucose. Its products are 1-O-trans-cinnamoyl-β-D-glucopyranose and uridine diphosphate (UDP).

This enzyme belongs to the family of glycosyltransferases, specifically the hexosyltransferases. The systematic name of this enzyme class is UDP-glucose:trans-cinnamate beta-D-glucosyltransferase. Other names in common use include uridine diphosphoglucose-cinnamate glucosyltransferase, and UDPG:t-cinnamate glucosyltransferase.
