= Poly(ribitol-phosphate) beta-glucosyltransferase =

Class of enzymes

poly(ribitol-phosphate) beta-glucosyltransferase

Identifiers
- EC no.: 2.4.1.53
- CAS no.: 37277-61-5

Databases
- IntEnz: IntEnz view
- BRENDA: BRENDA entry
- ExPASy: NiceZyme view
- KEGG: KEGG entry
- MetaCyc: metabolic pathway
- PRIAM: profile
- PDB structures: RCSB PDB PDBe PDBsum
- Gene Ontology: AmiGO / QuickGO
Search
- PMC: articles
- PubMed: articles
- NCBI: proteins

In enzymology, a poly(ribitol-phosphate) beta-glucosyltransferase (EC 2.4.1.53) is an enzyme that catalyzes the chemical reaction

UDP-glucose + poly(ribitol phosphate) $\rightleftharpoons$ UDP + (beta-D-glucosyl)poly(ribitol phosphate)

Thus, the two substrates of this enzyme are UDP-glucose and poly(ribitol phosphate), whereas its two products are UDP and (beta-D-glucosyl)poly(ribitol phosphate).

This enzyme belongs to the family of glycosyltransferases, specifically the hexosyltransferases. The systematic name of this enzyme class is UDP-glucose:poly(ribitol-phosphate) beta-D-glucosyltransferase. Other names in common use include UDP glucose-poly(ribitol-phosphate) beta-glucosyltransferase, uridine diphosphoglucose-poly(ribitol-phosphate), beta-glucosyltransferase, UDP-D-glucose polyribitol phosphate glucosyl transferase, and UDP-D-glucose:polyribitol phosphate glucosyl transferase.
