= Diglucosyl diacylglycerol synthase =

Class of enzymes

diglucosyl diacylglycerol synthase

Identifiers
- EC no.: 2.4.1.208
- CAS no.: 168680-19-1

Databases
- IntEnz: IntEnz view
- BRENDA: BRENDA entry
- ExPASy: NiceZyme view
- KEGG: KEGG entry
- MetaCyc: metabolic pathway
- PRIAM: profile
- PDB structures: RCSB PDB PDBe PDBsum
- Gene Ontology: AmiGO / QuickGO
Search
- PMC: articles
- PubMed: articles
- NCBI: proteins

In enzymology, a diglucosyl diacylglycerol synthase (EC 2.4.1.208) is an enzyme that catalyzes the chemical reaction

UDP-glucose + 1,2-diacyl-3-O-(alpha-D-glucopyranosyl)-sn-glycerol $\rightleftharpoons$ 1,2-diacyl-3-O-(alpha-D-glucopyranosyl(1->2)-O-alpha-D- glucopyranosyl)sn-glycerol + UDP

Thus, the two substrates of this enzyme are UDP-glucose and 1,2-diacyl-3-O-(alpha-D-glucopyranosyl)-sn-glycerol, whereas its 2 products are 1,2-diacyl-3-O-(alpha-D-glucopyranosyl(1-2)-O-alpha-D-glucopyranosyl)sn-glycerol, and UDP.

This enzyme belongs to the family of glycosyltransferases, specifically the hexosyltransferases. The systematic name of this enzyme class is UDP-glucose:1,2-diacyl-3-O-(alpha-D-glucopyranosyl)-sn-glycerol (1->2) glucosyltransferase. Other names in common use include monoglucosyl diacylglycerol (1->2) glucosyltransferase, MGlcDAG (1->2) glucosyltransferase, and DGlcDAG synthase. It employs one cofactor, magnesium.
