= Phenol beta-glucosyltransferase =

Class of enzymes

phenol beta-glucosyltransferase

Identifiers
- EC no.: 2.4.1.35
- CAS no.: 9046-69-9

Databases
- IntEnz: IntEnz view
- BRENDA: BRENDA entry
- ExPASy: NiceZyme view
- KEGG: KEGG entry
- MetaCyc: metabolic pathway
- PRIAM: profile
- PDB structures: RCSB PDB PDBe PDBsum
- Gene Ontology: AmiGO / QuickGO
Search
- PMC: articles
- PubMed: articles
- NCBI: proteins

In enzymology, a phenol beta-glucosyltransferase (EC 2.4.1.35) is an enzyme that catalyzes the chemical reaction

UDP-glucose + a phenol $\rightleftharpoons$ UDP + an aryl beta-D-glucoside

Thus, the two substrates of this enzyme are UDP-glucose and phenol, whereas its two products are UDP and aryl beta-D-glucoside.

This enzyme belongs to the family of glycosyltransferases, specifically the hexosyltransferases. The systematic name of this enzyme class is UDP-glucose:phenol beta-D-glucosyltransferase. Other names in common use include UDPglucosyltransferase, phenol-beta-D-glucosyltransferase, UDP glucosyltransferase, UDP-glucose glucosyltransferase, and uridine diphosphoglucosyltransferase. This enzyme participates in starch and sucrose metabolism.
