= Anthocyanin 3'-O-beta-glucosyltransferase =

Class of enzymes

Identifiers
- EC no.: 2.4.1.238
- CAS no.: 380231-41-4

Databases
- IntEnz: IntEnz view
- BRENDA: BRENDA entry
- ExPASy: NiceZyme view
- KEGG: KEGG entry
- MetaCyc: metabolic pathway
- PRIAM: profile
- PDB structures: RCSB PDB PDBe PDBsum
Search
- PMC: articles
- PubMed: articles
- NCBI: proteins

In enzymology, an anthocyanin 3'-O-beta-glucosyltransferase (EC 2.4.1.238) is an enzyme that catalyzes the chemical reaction

UDP-glucose + an anthocyanin $\rightleftharpoons$ UDP + an anthocyanin 3'-O-beta-D-glucoside

Thus, the two substrates of this enzyme are UDP-glucose and anthocyanin, whereas its two products are UDP and anthocyanin 3'-O-beta-D-glucoside.

This enzyme belongs to the family of glycosyltransferases, specifically the hexosyltransferases. The systematic name of this enzyme class is UDP-glucose:anthocyanin 3'-O-beta-D-glucosyltransferase. Other names in common use include UDP-glucose:anthocyanin 3'-O-glucosyltransferase, and 3'GT.
