= Arylamine glucosyltransferase =

Class of enzymes

arylamine glucosyltransferase

Identifiers
- EC no.: 2.4.1.71
- CAS no.: 37277-72-8

Databases
- IntEnz: IntEnz view
- BRENDA: BRENDA entry
- ExPASy: NiceZyme view
- KEGG: KEGG entry
- MetaCyc: metabolic pathway
- PRIAM: profile
- PDB structures: RCSB PDB PDBe PDBsum
- Gene Ontology: AmiGO / QuickGO
Search
- PMC: articles
- PubMed: articles
- NCBI: proteins

In enzymology, an arylamine glucosyltransferase (EC 2.4.1.71) is an enzyme that catalyzes the chemical reaction

UDP-glucose + an arylamine $\rightleftharpoons$ UDP + an N-D-glucosylarylamine

Thus, the two substrates of this enzyme are UDP-glucose and arylamine, whereas its two products are UDP and N-D-glucosylarylamine.

This enzyme belongs to the family of glycosyltransferases, specifically the hexosyltransferases. The systematic name of this enzyme class is UDP-glucose:arylamine N-D-glucosyltransferase. Other names in common use include UDP glucose-arylamine glucosyltransferase, and uridine diphosphoglucose-arylamine glucosyltransferase.
