= 1,4-beta-D-xylan synthase =

Class of enzymes

Identifiers
- EC no.: 2.4.2.24
- CAS no.: 37277-73-9

Databases
- IntEnz: IntEnz view
- BRENDA: BRENDA entry
- ExPASy: NiceZyme view
- KEGG: KEGG entry
- MetaCyc: metabolic pathway
- PRIAM: profile
- PDB structures: RCSB PDB PDBe PDBsum
- Gene Ontology: AmiGO / QuickGO
Search
- PMC: articles
- PubMed: articles
- NCBI: proteins

In enzymology, a 1,4-beta-D-xylan synthase (EC 2.4.2.24) is an enzyme that catalyzes the chemical reaction

UDP-D-xylose + (1,4-beta-D-xylan)n $\rightleftharpoons$ UDP + (1,4-beta-D-xylan)n^{+}1

Thus, the two substrates of this enzyme are UDP-D-xylose and (1,4-beta-D-xylan)n, whereas its two products are UDP and (1,4-beta-D-xylan)n+1.

This enzyme belongs to the family of glycosyltransferases, specifically the pentosyltransferases. The systematic name of this enzyme class is UDP-D-xylose:1,4-beta-D-xylan 4-beta-D-xylosyltransferase. Other names in common use include uridine diphosphoxylose-1,4-beta-xylan xylosyltransferase, 1,4-beta-xylan synthase, xylan synthase, and xylan synthetase. This enzyme participates in starch and sucrose metabolism and nucleotide sugars metabolism.
