= N-hydroxythioamide S-beta-glucosyltransferase =

Class of enzymes

thiohydroximate beta-D-glucosyltransferase

Identifiers
- EC no.: 2.4.1.195
- CAS no.: 9068-14-8

Databases
- BRENDA: enzyme data
- ExPASy: NiceZyme view
- KEGG: enzyme entry
- MetaCyc: metabolic pathway
- Rhea: reactions
- PDB structures: RCSB PDB PDBe PDBsum
- Gene Ontology: AmiGO / QuickGO
Search
- PMC: articles
- PubMed: articles
- NCBI: proteins

N-hydroxythioamide S-beta-glucosyltransferase (EC 2.4.1.195) is an enzyme that catalyzes several chemical reactions that are part of the biosynthesis of plant glucosinolates. For example, 4-methylthiobutylthiohydroximate is converted to 3-methylthiopropyl-desulfoglucosinolate by transfer of a glucose unit from UDP-glucose, giving uridine diphosphate (UDP) as a byproduct:

4-methylthiobutylthiohydroximate
+ UDP-glucose
UDP
3-methylthiopropyl-desulfoglucosinolate

The enzyme has been characterised from Brassica napus and Arabidopsis. It belongs to the family of glycosyltransferases, specifically the hexosyltransferases. The systematic name of this enzyme class is UDP-glucose:N-hydroxy-2-phenylethanethioamide S-beta-D-glucosyltransferase. Other names in common use include desulfoglucosinolate-uridine diphosphate glucosyltransferase, uridine diphosphoglucose-thiohydroximate glucosyltransferase, thiohydroximate beta-D-glucosyltransferase, UDPG:thiohydroximate glucosyltransferase, thiohydroximate S-glucosyltransferase, thiohydroximate glucosyltransferase, and UDP-glucose:thiohydroximate S-beta-D-glucosyltransferase.
