= Monoterpenol beta-glucosyltransferase =

Class of enzymes

Identifiers
- EC no.: 2.4.1.127
- CAS no.: 78990-64-4

Databases
- IntEnz: IntEnz view
- BRENDA: BRENDA entry
- ExPASy: NiceZyme view
- KEGG: KEGG entry
- MetaCyc: metabolic pathway
- PRIAM: profile
- PDB structures: RCSB PDB PDBe PDBsum
- Gene Ontology: AmiGO / QuickGO
Search
- PMC: articles
- PubMed: articles
- NCBI: proteins

Monoterpenol beta-glucosyltransferase (EC 2.4.1.127) is an enzyme that catalyzes the chemical reaction

menthol
+ UDP-glucose
(-)-menthyl β-D-glucoside

The two substrates of this enzyme characterised from tomato are (-)-menthol and UDP-glucose. Its products are (-)-menthyl β-D-glucoside and uridine diphosphate (UDP).

This enzyme belongs to the family of glycosyltransferases, specifically the hexosyltransferases. The systematic name of this enzyme class is UDP-glucose:(-)-menthol O-beta-D-glucosyltransferase. Other names in common use include uridine diphosphoglucose-monoterpenol glucosyltransferase, and UDPglucose:monoterpenol glucosyltransferase.
