= Nuatigenin 3beta-glucosyltransferase =

Class of enzymes

nuatigenin 3-beta-glucosyltransferase

Identifiers
- EC no.: 2.4.1.192
- CAS no.: 108891-57-2

Databases
- IntEnz: IntEnz view
- BRENDA: BRENDA entry
- ExPASy: NiceZyme view
- KEGG: KEGG entry
- MetaCyc: metabolic pathway
- PRIAM: profile
- PDB structures: RCSB PDB PDBe PDBsum
- Gene Ontology: AmiGO / QuickGO
Search
- PMC: articles
- PubMed: articles
- NCBI: proteins

In enzymology, a nuatigenin 3beta-glucosyltransferase (EC 2.4.1.192) is an enzyme that catalyzes the chemical reaction

UDP-glucose + (20S,22S,25S)-22,25-epoxyfurost-5-ene-3beta,26-diol $\rightleftharpoons$ UDP + (20S,22S,25S)-22,25-epoxyfurost-5-ene-3beta,26-diol 3-O-beta-D-glucoside

Thus, the two substrates of this enzyme are UDP-glucose and (20S,22S,25S)-22,25-epoxyfurost-5-ene-3beta,26-diol, whereas its 3 products are UDP, (20S,22S,25S)-22,25-epoxyfurost-5-ene-3beta,26-diol, and 3-O-beta-D-glucoside.

This enzyme belongs to the family of glycosyltransferases, specifically the hexosyltransferases. The systematic name of this enzyme class is UDP-glucose:(20S,22S,25S)-22,25-epoxyfurost-5-ene-3beta,26-diol 3-O-beta-D-glucosyltransferase. This enzyme is also called uridine diphosphoglucose-nuatigenin glucosyltransferase.
