= Flavonol-3-O-glucoside glucosyltransferase =

Class of enzymes

Identifiers
- EC no.: 2.4.1.239

Databases
- IntEnz: IntEnz view
- BRENDA: BRENDA entry
- ExPASy: NiceZyme view
- KEGG: KEGG entry
- MetaCyc: metabolic pathway
- PRIAM: profile
- PDB structures: RCSB PDB PDBe PDBsum
Search
- PMC: articles
- PubMed: articles
- NCBI: proteins

In enzymology, a flavonol-3-O-glucoside glucosyltransferase (EC 2.4.1.239) is an enzyme that catalyzes the chemical reaction

UDP-glucose + a flavonol 3-O-beta-D-glucoside $\rightleftharpoons$ UDP + a flavonol 3-O-beta-D-glucosyl-(1->2)-beta-D-glucoside

Thus, the two substrates of this enzyme are UDP-glucose and flavonol 3-O-beta-D-glucoside, whereas its two products are UDP and flavonol 3-O-beta-D-glucosyl-(1→2)-beta-D-glucoside.

This enzyme belongs to the family of glycosyltransferases, specifically the hexosyltransferases. The systematic name of this enzyme class is UDP-glucose:flavonol-3-O-glucoside 2''-O-beta-D-glucosyltransferase.
