= Lipopolysaccharide glucosyltransferase I =

Class of enzymes

lipopolysaccharide glucosyltransferase I

Identifiers
- EC no.: 2.4.1.58
- CAS no.: 9074-00-4

Databases
- IntEnz: IntEnz view
- BRENDA: BRENDA entry
- ExPASy: NiceZyme view
- KEGG: KEGG entry
- MetaCyc: metabolic pathway
- PRIAM: profile
- PDB structures: RCSB PDB PDBe PDBsum
- Gene Ontology: AmiGO / QuickGO
Search
- PMC: articles
- PubMed: articles
- NCBI: proteins

In enzymology, a lipopolysaccharide glucosyltransferase I (EC 2.4.1.58) is an enzyme that catalyzes the chemical reaction

UDP-glucose + lipopolysaccharide $\rightleftharpoons$ UDP + D-glucosyl-lipopolysaccharide

Thus, the two substrates of this enzyme are UDP-glucose and lipopolysaccharide, whereas its two products are UDP and D-glucosyl-lipopolysaccharide.

This enzyme belongs to the family of glycosyltransferases, specifically the hexosyltransferases. The systematic name of this enzyme class is UDP-glucose:lipopolysaccharide glucosyltransferase. Other names in common use include UDP-glucose:lipopolysaccharide glucosyltransferase I, lipopolysaccharide glucosyltransferase, uridine diphosphate glucose:lipopolysaccharide glucosyltransferase, I, and uridine diphosphoglucose-lipopolysaccharide glucosyltransferase. This enzyme participates in lipopolysaccharide biosynthesis and glycan structures - biosynthesis 2.
