= N-acetylglucosaminyldiphosphoundecaprenol glucosyltransferase =

Class of enzymes

Identifiers
- EC no.: 2.4.1.188
- CAS no.: 118731-83-2

Databases
- IntEnz: IntEnz view
- BRENDA: BRENDA entry
- ExPASy: NiceZyme view
- KEGG: KEGG entry
- MetaCyc: metabolic pathway
- PRIAM: profile
- PDB structures: RCSB PDB PDBe PDBsum
- Gene Ontology: AmiGO / QuickGO
Search
- PMC: articles
- PubMed: articles
- NCBI: proteins

In enzymology, a N-acetylglucosaminyldiphosphoundecaprenol glucosyltransferase (EC 2.4.1.188) is an enzyme that catalyzes the chemical reaction

UDP-glucose + N-acetyl-D-glucosaminyldiphosphoundecaprenol $\rightleftharpoons$ UDP + beta-D-glucosyl-1,4-N-acetyl-D-glucosaminyldiphosphoundecaprenol

Thus, the two substrates of this enzyme are UDP-glucose and N-acetyl-D-glucosaminyldiphosphoundecaprenol, whereas its two products are UDP and beta-D-glucosyl-1,4-N-acetyl-D-glucosaminyldiphosphoundecaprenol.

This enzyme belongs to the family of glycosyltransferases, specifically the hexosyltransferases. The systematic name of this enzyme class is UDP-glucose:N-acetyl-D-glucosaminyldiphosphoundecaprenol 4-beta-D-glucosyltransferase. Other names in common use include UDP-D-glucose:N-acetylglucosaminyl pyrophosphorylundecaprenol, glucosyltransferase, uridine, diphosphoglucose-acetylglucosaminylpyrophosphorylundecaprenol, and glucosyltransferase.
