= Procollagen glucosyltransferase =

Class of enzymes

Identifiers
- EC no.: 2.4.1.66
- CAS no.: 9028-08-4

Databases
- IntEnz: IntEnz view
- BRENDA: BRENDA entry
- ExPASy: NiceZyme view
- KEGG: KEGG entry
- MetaCyc: metabolic pathway
- PRIAM: profile
- PDB structures: RCSB PDB PDBe PDBsum
Search
- PMC: articles
- PubMed: articles
- NCBI: proteins

In enzymology, a procollagen glucosyltransferase (EC 2.4.1.66) is an enzyme that catalyzes the chemical reaction

UDP-glucose + 5-(D-galactosyloxy)-L-lysine-procollagen $\rightleftharpoons$ UDP + 1,2-D-glucosyl-5-D-(galactosyloxy)-L-lysine-procollagen

Thus, the two substrates of this enzyme are UDP-glucose and 5-(D-galactosyloxy)-L-lysine-procollagen, whereas its two products are UDP and 1,2-D-glucosyl-5-D-(galactosyloxy)-L-lysine-procollagen.

This enzyme belongs to the family of glycosyltransferases, specifically the hexosyltransferases. The systematic name of this enzyme class is UDP-glucose:5-(D-galactosyloxy)-L-lysine-procollagen D-glucosyltransferase. Other names in common use include galactosylhydroxylysine glucosyltransferase, collagen glucosyltransferase, collagen hydroxylysyl glucosyltransferase, galactosylhydroxylysyl glucosyltransferase, UDP-glucose-collagenglucosyltransferase, and uridine diphosphoglucose-collagen glucosyltransferase.
