= Indole-3-acetate beta-glucosyltransferase =

Class of enzymes

Identifiers
- EC no.: 2.4.1.121
- CAS no.: 74082-56-7

Databases
- IntEnz: IntEnz view
- BRENDA: BRENDA entry
- ExPASy: NiceZyme view
- KEGG: KEGG entry
- MetaCyc: metabolic pathway
- PRIAM: profile
- PDB structures: RCSB PDB PDBe PDBsum
- Gene Ontology: AmiGO / QuickGO
Search
- PMC: articles
- PubMed: articles
- NCBI: proteins

Indole-3-acetate beta-glucosyltransferase (EC 2.4.1.121) is an enzyme that catalyzes the chemical reaction

indole-3-acetic acid
+ UDP-glucose
UDP
1-O-(indol-3-ylacetyl)-β-D-glucose

The two substrates of this enzyme characterised from maize are indole-3-acetic acid and UDP-glucose. Its products are 1-O-(indol-3-ylacetyl)-β-D-glucose and uridine diphosphate (UDP).

This enzyme belongs to the family of glycosyltransferases, specifically the hexosyltransferases. The systematic name of this enzyme class is UDP-glucose:(indol-3-yl)acetate beta-D-glucosyltransferase. Other names in common use include uridine diphosphoglucose-indoleacetate glucosyltransferase, UDPG-indol-3-ylacetyl glucosyl transferase, UDP-glucose:indol-3-ylacetate glucosyltransferase, indol-3-ylacetylglucose synthase, UDP-glucose:indol-3-ylacetate glucosyl-transferase, IAGlu synthase, IAA-glucose synthase, and UDP-glucose:indole-3-acetate beta-D-glucosyltransferase.
