= Lipopolysaccharide glucosyltransferase II =

Class of enzymes

lipopolysaccharide glucosyltransferase II

Identifiers
- EC no.: 2.4.1.73
- CAS no.: 51004-27-4

Databases
- IntEnz: IntEnz view
- BRENDA: BRENDA entry
- ExPASy: NiceZyme view
- KEGG: KEGG entry
- MetaCyc: metabolic pathway
- PRIAM: profile
- PDB structures: RCSB PDB PDBe PDBsum
- Gene Ontology: AmiGO / QuickGO
Search
- PMC: articles
- PubMed: articles
- NCBI: proteins

In enzymology, a lipopolysaccharide glucosyltransferase II (EC 2.4.1.73) is an enzyme that catalyzes the chemical reaction

UDP-glucose + lipopolysaccharide $\rightleftharpoons$ UDP + alpha-D-glucosyl-lipopolysaccharide

Thus, the two substrates of this enzyme are UDP-glucose and lipopolysaccharide, whereas its two products are UDP and alpha-D-glucosyl-lipopolysaccharide.

This enzyme belongs to the family of glycosyltransferases, specifically the hexosyltransferases. The systematic name of this enzyme class is UDP-glucose:galactosyl-lipopolysaccharide alpha-D-glucosyltransferase. Other names in common use include uridine diphosphoglucose-galactosylpolysaccharide, and glucosyltransferase.
