= Glycogenin =

Enzyme involved in converting glucose to glycogen

Glycogenin glucosyltransferase
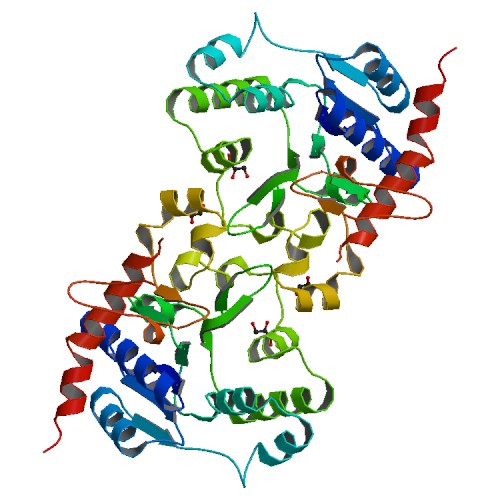
- Glycogenin structure (from rabbit).

Identifiers
- EC no.: 2.4.1.186
- CAS no.: 117590-73-5

Databases
- BRENDA: enzyme data
- ExPASy: NiceZyme view
- KEGG: enzyme entry
- MetaCyc: metabolic pathway
- Rhea: reactions
- PDB structures: RCSB PDB PDBe PDBsum
Search
- PMC: articles
- PubMed: articles
- NCBI: proteins

Glycogenin is an enzyme involved in converting glucose to glycogen. It acts as a primer, by polymerizing the first few glucose molecules, after which other enzymes take over. It is a homodimer of 37-kDa subunits and is classified as a glycosyltransferase.

It catalyzes the chemical reactions:

UDP-α-D-glucose + glycogenin ⇌ UDP + α-D-glucosylglycogenin
UDP-α-D-glucose + (1,4-α-D-glucosyl)_{n}-glycogenin ⇌ (1,4-α-D-glucosyl)_{n}-glucosylglycogenin + UDP

Thus, the two substrates of this enzyme are UDP-α-D-glucose and glycogenin, whereas its two products are UDP and α-D-glucosylglycogenin.

== Nomenclature ==
This enzyme belongs to the family of glycosyltransferases, specifically the hexosyltransferases. The systematic name of this enzyme class is UDP-α-D-glucose:glycogenin α-D-glucosyltransferase. Other names in common use include:

- glycogenin,
- priming glucosyltransferase, and
- UDP-glucose:glycogenin glucosyltransferase.

One may also notice that the naming of glycogenin hints at its function, with the glyco prefix referring to a carbohydrate and the genin suffix derived from the Latin genesis meaning novel, source, or beginning. This hints at the role of glycogenin to simply start glycogen synthesis before glycogen synthase takes over.

== Discovery ==
Glycogenin was discovered in 1984 by Dr. William J. Whelan, a fellow of the Royal Society of London and former professor of Biochemistry at the University of Miami.

== Function ==
The main enzyme involved in glycogen polymerisation, glycogen synthase in the liver and in the muscle glycogen synthesis is initiated by UDP-glucose, can only add to an existing chain of at least 3 glucose residues. Glycogenin acts as the primer, to which further glucose monomers may be added. It achieves this by catalyzing the addition of glucose to itself (autocatalysis) by first binding glucose from UDP-glucose to the hydroxyl group of Tyr-194. Seven more glucoses can be added, each derived from UDP-glucose, by glycogenin's glucosyltransferase activity. Once sufficient residues have been added, glycogen synthase takes over extending the chain. Glycogenin remains covalently attached to the reducing end of the glycogen molecule.

Evidence accumulates that a priming protein may be a fundamental property of polysaccharide synthesis in general; the molecular details of mammalian glycogen biogenesis may serve as a useful model for other systems.

Glycogenin is able to use the other two pyrimidine nucleotides as well, namely CDP-glucose and TDP-glucose, in addition to its native substrate, UDP-glucose.

== Structure ==
2-D cross-sectional view of glycogen. A core protein of glycogenin is surrounded by branches of glucose units. The entire globular complex may contain approximately 30 000 glucose units.

== Isozymes ==
In humans, there are two isoforms of glycogenin — glycogenin-1, encoded by GYG1, and expressed in muscle; and glycogenin-2, encoded by GYG2, and expressed in the liver and cardiac muscle, but not skeletal muscle. Patients have been found with defective GYG1, resulting in muscle cells with the inability to store glycogen, and consequential weakness and heart disease.

glycogenin 1

Identifiers
- Symbol: GYG1
- Alt. symbols: GYG
- NCBI gene: 2992
- HGNC: 4699
- OMIM: 603942
- RefSeq: NM_004130
- UniProt: P46976

Other data
- EC number: 2.4.1.186
- Locus: Chr. 3 q24-q25.1
Search for
- Structures: Swiss-model
- Domains: InterPro

glycogenin 2

Identifiers
- Symbol: GYG2
- NCBI gene: 8908
- HGNC: 4700
- OMIM: 300198
- RefSeq: NM_003918
- UniProt: O15488

Other data
- EC number: 2.4.1.186
- Locus: Chr. X p22.3
Search for
- Structures: Swiss-model
- Domains: InterPro
