= Hydroquinone glucosyltransferase =

Class of enzymes

Identifiers
- EC no.: 2.4.1.218

Databases
- IntEnz: IntEnz view
- BRENDA: BRENDA entry
- ExPASy: NiceZyme view
- KEGG: KEGG entry
- MetaCyc: metabolic pathway
- PRIAM: profile
- PDB structures: RCSB PDB PDBe PDBsum
- Gene Ontology: AmiGO / QuickGO
Search
- PMC: articles
- PubMed: articles
- NCBI: proteins

Hydroquinone glucosyltransferase (EC 2.4.1.218) is an enzyme that catalyzes the chemical reaction

hydroquinone
+ UDP-glucose
UDP
arbutin

The two substrates of this enzyme characterised from Rauvolfia are hydroquinone and UDP-glucose. Its products are arbutin and uridine diphosphate (UDP).

This enzyme belongs to the family of glycosyltransferases, specifically the hexosyltransferases. The systematic name of this enzyme class is UDP-glucose:hydroquinone-O-beta-D-glucosyltransferase. Other names in common use include arbutin synthase, and hydroquinone:O-glucosyltransferase.
