= Alpha-1,3-glucan synthase =

Class of enzymes

alpha-1,3-glucan synthase

Identifiers
- EC no.: 2.4.1.183
- CAS no.: 113478-38-9

Databases
- IntEnz: IntEnz view
- BRENDA: BRENDA entry
- ExPASy: NiceZyme view
- KEGG: KEGG entry
- MetaCyc: metabolic pathway
- PRIAM: profile
- PDB structures: RCSB PDB PDBe PDBsum
- Gene Ontology: AmiGO / QuickGO
Search
- PMC: articles
- PubMed: articles
- NCBI: proteins

In enzymology, an alpha-1,3-glucan synthase (EC 2.4.1.183) is an enzyme that catalyzes the chemical reaction

UDP-glucose + [alpha-D-glucosyl-(1-3)]n $\rightleftharpoons$ UDP + [alpha-D-glucosyl-(1-3)]n^{+}1

Thus, the two substrates of this enzyme are UDP-glucose and [[[alpha-D-glucosyl-(1-3)]n]], whereas its two products are UDP and [[[alpha-D-glucosyl-(1-3)]n+1]].

This enzyme belongs to the family of glycosyltransferases, specifically the hexosyltransferases. The systematic name of this enzyme class is UDP-glucose:alpha-D-(1-3)-glucan 3-alpha-D-glucosyltransferase. Other names in common use include uridine diphosphoglucose-1,3-alpha-glucan glucosyltransferase, and 1,3-alpha-D-glucan synthase.
