= Pyridoxine 5'-O-beta-D-glucosyltransferase =

Class of enzymes

Identifiers
- EC no.: 2.4.1.160
- CAS no.: 83744-97-2

Databases
- IntEnz: IntEnz view
- BRENDA: BRENDA entry
- ExPASy: NiceZyme view
- KEGG: KEGG entry
- MetaCyc: metabolic pathway
- PRIAM: profile
- PDB structures: RCSB PDB PDBe PDBsum
- Gene Ontology: AmiGO / QuickGO
Search
- PMC: articles
- PubMed: articles
- NCBI: proteins

Pyridoxine 5'-O-beta-D-glucosyltransferase (EC 2.4.1.160) is an enzyme that catalyzes the chemical reaction

pyridoxine
+ UDP-glucose
UDP
5'-O-β-D-glucosylpyridoxine

The two substrates of this enzyme characterised from pea are pyridoxine and UDP-glucose. Its products are 5'-O-β-D-glucosylpyridoxine and uridine diphosphate (UDP).

This enzyme belongs to the family of glycosyltransferases, specifically the hexosyltransferases. The systematic name of this enzyme class is UDP-glucose:pyridoxine 5'-O-beta-D-glucosyltransferase. Other names in common use include UDP-glucose:pyridoxine 5'-O-beta-glucosyltransferase, uridine diphosphoglucose-pyridoxine 5'-beta-glucosyltransferase, and UDP-glucose-pyridoxine glucosyltransferase.
