= 13-hydroxydocosanoate 13-beta-glucosyltransferase =

Class of enzymes

Identifiers
- EC no.: 2.4.1.158
- CAS no.: 70457-13-5

Databases
- IntEnz: IntEnz view
- BRENDA: BRENDA entry
- ExPASy: NiceZyme view
- KEGG: KEGG entry
- MetaCyc: metabolic pathway
- PRIAM: profile
- PDB structures: RCSB PDB PDBe PDBsum
- Gene Ontology: AmiGO / QuickGO
Search
- PMC: articles
- PubMed: articles
- NCBI: proteins

In enzymology, a 13-hydroxydocosanoate 13-beta-glucosyltransferase (EC 2.4.1.158) is an enzyme that catalyzes the chemical reaction. This reaction is part of sophorosyloxydocosanoate biosynthesis. Extracts for research are frequently obtained from Candida yeasts.

UDP-glucose + 13-hydroxydocosanoate $\rightleftharpoons$ UDP + 13-beta-D-glucosyloxydocosanoate

Thus, the two substrates of this enzyme are UDP-glucose and 13-hydroxydocosanoate, whereas its two products are UDP and 13-beta-D-glucosyloxydocosanoate.

This enzyme belongs to the family of glycosyltransferases, specifically the hexosyltransferases. The systematic name of this enzyme class is UDP-glucose:13-hydroxydocosanoate 13-beta-D-glucosyltransferase. Other names in common use include 13-glucosyloxydocosanoate 2'-beta-glucosyltransferase, UDP-glucose:13-hydroxydocosanoic acid glucosyltransferase, uridine diphosphoglucose-hydroxydocosanoate glucosyltransferase, and UDP-glucose-13-hydroxydocosanoate glucosyltransferase.
