= Gibberellin beta-D-glucosyltransferase =

Class of enzymes

gibberellin beta-D-glucosyltransferase

Identifiers
- EC no.: 2.4.1.176
- CAS no.: 99775-14-1

Databases
- IntEnz: IntEnz view
- BRENDA: BRENDA entry
- ExPASy: NiceZyme view
- KEGG: KEGG entry
- MetaCyc: metabolic pathway
- PRIAM: profile
- PDB structures: RCSB PDB PDBe PDBsum
- Gene Ontology: AmiGO / QuickGO
Search
- PMC: articles
- PubMed: articles
- NCBI: proteins

In enzymology, a gibberellin beta-D-glucosyltransferase (EC 2.4.1.176) is an enzyme that catalyzes the chemical reaction

UDP-glucose + gibberellin $\rightleftharpoons$ UDP + gibberellin 2-O-beta-D-glucoside

Thus, the two substrates of this enzyme are UDP-glucose and gibberellin, whereas its two products are UDP and gibberellin 2-O-beta-D-glucoside.

This enzyme belongs to the family of glycosyltransferases, specifically the hexosyltransferases. The systematic name of this enzyme class is UDP-glucose:gibberellin 2-O-beta-D-glucosyltransferase. Other names in common use include uridine diphosphoglucose-gibberellate 7-glucosyltransferase, and uridine diphosphoglucose-gibberellate 3-O-glucosyltransferase.
