= Phosphopolyprenol glucosyltransferase =

Class of enzymes

phosphopolyprenol glucosyltransferase

Identifiers
- EC no.: 2.4.1.78
- CAS no.: 55576-46-0

Databases
- IntEnz: IntEnz view
- BRENDA: BRENDA entry
- ExPASy: NiceZyme view
- KEGG: KEGG entry
- MetaCyc: metabolic pathway
- PRIAM: profile
- PDB structures: RCSB PDB PDBe PDBsum
- Gene Ontology: AmiGO / QuickGO
Search
- PMC: articles
- PubMed: articles
- NCBI: proteins

In enzymology, a phosphopolyprenol glucosyltransferase (EC 2.4.1.78) is an enzyme that catalyzes the chemical reaction

UDP-glucose + polyprenyl phosphate $\rightleftharpoons$ UDP + polyprenylphosphate-glucose

Thus, the two substrates of this enzyme are UDP-glucose and polyprenyl phosphate, whereas its two products are UDP and polyprenylphosphate-glucose.

This enzyme belongs to the family of glycosyltransferases, specifically the hexosyltransferases. The systematic name of this enzyme class is UDP-glucose:phosphopolyprenol D-glucosyltransferase. Other names in common use include uridine diphosphoglucose-polyprenol monophosphate, glucosyltransferase, and UDP-glucose:polyprenol monophosphate glucosyltransferase.
