= Sterol 3beta-glucosyltransferase =

Class of enzymes

sterol 3-beta-glucosyltransferase

Identifiers
- EC no.: 2.4.1.173
- CAS no.: 123940-38-5

Databases
- IntEnz: IntEnz view
- BRENDA: BRENDA entry
- ExPASy: NiceZyme view
- KEGG: KEGG entry
- MetaCyc: metabolic pathway
- PRIAM: profile
- PDB structures: RCSB PDB PDBe PDBsum
- Gene Ontology: AmiGO / QuickGO
Search
- PMC: articles
- PubMed: articles
- NCBI: proteins

In enzymology, a sterol 3beta-glucosyltransferase (EC 2.4.1.173) is an enzyme that catalyzes the chemical reaction

UDP-glucose + a sterol $\rightleftharpoons$ UDP + a sterol 3-beta-D-glucoside

Thus, the two substrates of this enzyme are UDP-glucose and sterol, whereas its two products are UDP and sterol 3-beta-D-glucoside.

This enzyme belongs to the family of glycosyltransferases, specifically the hexosyltransferases. The systematic name of this enzyme class is UDP-glucose:sterol 3-O-beta-D-glucosyltransferase. Other names in common use include UDPG:sterol glucosyltransferase, UDP-glucose-sterol beta-glucosyltransferase, sterol:UDPG glucosyltransferase, UDPG-SGTase, uridine diphosphoglucose-poriferasterol glucosyltransferase, uridine diphosphoglucose-sterol glucosyltransferase, sterol glucosyltransferase, sterol-beta-D-glucosyltransferase, and UDP-glucose-sterol glucosyltransferase.
