= Polygalacturonate 4-alpha-galacturonosyltransferase =

Class of enzymes

polygalacturonate 4-alpha-galacturonosyltransferase

Identifiers
- EC no.: 2.4.1.43
- CAS no.: 37277-53-5

Databases
- IntEnz: IntEnz view
- BRENDA: BRENDA entry
- ExPASy: NiceZyme view
- KEGG: KEGG entry
- MetaCyc: metabolic pathway
- PRIAM: profile
- PDB structures: RCSB PDB PDBe PDBsum
- Gene Ontology: AmiGO / QuickGO
Search
- PMC: articles
- PubMed: articles
- NCBI: proteins

In enzymology, a polygalacturonate 4-alpha-galacturonosyltransferase (EC 2.4.1.43) is an enzyme that catalyzes the chemical reaction

UDP-D-galacturonate + (1,4-alpha-D-galacturonosyl)n $\rightleftharpoons$ UDP + (1,4-alpha-D-galacturonosyl)n^{+}1

Thus, the two substrates of this enzyme are UDP-D-galacturonate and (1,4-alpha-D-galacturonosyl)n, whereas its two products are UDP and (1,4-alpha-D-galacturonosyl)n+1.

This enzyme belongs to the family of glycosyltransferases, specifically the hexosyltransferases. The systematic name of this enzyme class is UDP-D-galacturonate:1,4-alpha-poly-D-galacturonate 4-alpha-D-galacturonosyltransferase. Other names in common use include UDP galacturonate-polygalacturonate alpha-galacturonosyltransferase, uridine diphosphogalacturonate-polygalacturonate, and alpha-galacturonosyltransferase. This enzyme participates in starch and sucrose metabolism and nucleotide sugars metabolism.

== Indications ==
Polygalacturonate salts can be used clinically to treat the GI reactions that are due to Quinidine.
