= Nicotinate glucosyltransferase =

Class of enzymes

Identifiers
- EC no.: 2.4.1.196
- CAS no.: 120858-56-2

Databases
- IntEnz: IntEnz view
- BRENDA: BRENDA entry
- ExPASy: NiceZyme view
- KEGG: KEGG entry
- MetaCyc: metabolic pathway
- PRIAM: profile
- PDB structures: RCSB PDB PDBe PDBsum
- Gene Ontology: AmiGO / QuickGO
Search
- PMC: articles
- PubMed: articles
- NCBI: proteins

Nicotinate glucosyltransferase (EC 2.4.1.196) is an enzyme that catalyzes the reversible chemical reaction

nicotinic acid
+ UDP-glucose
UDP
UDP
N-(β-D-glucosyl)nicotinate

The two substrates of this enzyme characterised from parsley are nicotinic acid and UDP-glucose. Its products are N-(β-D-glucosyl)nicotinate and uridine diphosphate (UDP).

This enzyme belongs to the family of glycosyltransferases, specifically the hexosyltransferases. The systematic name of this enzyme class is UDP-glucose:nicotinate N-glucosyltransferase. Other names in common use include uridine diphosphoglucose-nicotinate N-glucosyltransferase, and UDP-glucose:nicotinic acid-N-glucosyltransferase.
