= Cytokinin 7-beta-glucosyltransferase =

Class of enzymes

cytokinin 7-beta-glucosyltransferase

Identifiers
- EC no.: 2.4.1.118
- CAS no.: 72103-03-8

Databases
- IntEnz: IntEnz view
- BRENDA: BRENDA entry
- ExPASy: NiceZyme view
- KEGG: KEGG entry
- MetaCyc: metabolic pathway
- PRIAM: profile
- PDB structures: RCSB PDB PDBe PDBsum
- Gene Ontology: AmiGO / QuickGO
Search
- PMC: articles
- PubMed: articles
- NCBI: proteins

In enzymology, a cytokinin 7-β-glucosyltransferase (EC 2.4.1.118) is an enzyme that catalyzes the chemical reaction

UDP-glucose + N^{6}-alkylaminopurine $\rightleftharpoons$ UDP + N^{6}-alkylaminopurine-7-β-D-glucoside

Thus, the two substrates of this enzyme are UDP-glucose and N^{6}-alkylaminopurine, whereas its two products are UDP and N^{6}-alkylaminopurine-7-β-D-glucoside.

This enzyme belongs to the family of glycosyltransferases, specifically the hexosyltransferases. The systematic name of this enzyme class is UDP-glucose:N^{6}-alkylaminopurine 7-glucosyltransferase. Other names in common use include uridine diphosphoglucose-zeatin 7-glucosyltransferase, and cytokinin 7-glucosyltransferase.
