= Alizarin 2-beta-glucosyltransferase =

Class of enzymes

alizarin 2-beta-glucosyltransferase

Identifiers
- EC no.: 2.4.1.103
- CAS no.: 74506-41-5

Databases
- IntEnz: IntEnz view
- BRENDA: BRENDA entry
- ExPASy: NiceZyme view
- KEGG: KEGG entry
- MetaCyc: metabolic pathway
- PRIAM: profile
- PDB structures: RCSB PDB PDBe PDBsum
- Gene Ontology: AmiGO / QuickGO
Search
- PMC: articles
- PubMed: articles
- NCBI: proteins

In enzymology, an alizarin 2-beta-glucosyltransferase (EC 2.4.1.103) is an enzyme that catalyzes the chemical reaction

UDP-glucose + alizarin $\rightleftharpoons$ UDP + 1-hydroxy-2-(beta-D-glucosyloxy)-9,10-anthraquinone

Thus, the two substrates of this enzyme are UDP-glucose and alizarin, whereas its two products are UDP and 1-hydroxy-2-(beta-D-glucosyloxy)-9,10-anthraquinone.

This enzyme belongs to the family of glycosyltransferases, specifically the hexosyltransferases. The systematic name of this enzyme class is UDP-glucose:1,2-dihydroxy-9,10-anthraquinone 2-O-beta-D-glucosyltransferase. This enzyme is also called uridine diphosphoglucose-alizarin glucosyltransferase.
