= Linamarin synthase =

Class of enzymes

Identifiers
- EC no.: 2.4.1.63
- CAS no.: 37277-68-2

Databases
- IntEnz: IntEnz view
- BRENDA: BRENDA entry
- ExPASy: NiceZyme view
- KEGG: KEGG entry
- MetaCyc: metabolic pathway
- PRIAM: profile
- PDB structures: RCSB PDB PDBe PDBsum
- Gene Ontology: AmiGO / QuickGO
Search
- PMC: articles
- PubMed: articles
- NCBI: proteins

Linamarin synthase (EC 2.4.1.63) is an enzyme that catalyzes the chemical reaction

acetone cyanohydrin
+ UDP-glucose
UDP
linamarin

The two substrates of this enzyme characterised from flax (Linum usitatissimum) are acetone cyanohydrin and UDP-glucose. Its products are linamarin and uridine diphosphate (UDP).

This enzyme belongs to the family of glycosyltransferases, specifically the hexosyltransferases. The systematic name of this enzyme class is UDP-glucose:2-hydroxy-2-methylpropanenitrile beta-D-glucosyltransferase. Other names in common use include uridine diphosphoglucose-ketone glucosyltransferase, uridine diphosphate-glucose-ketone cyanohydrin, beta-glucosyltransferase, UDP glucose ketone cyanohydrin glucosyltransferase, UDP-glucose:ketone cyanohydrin beta-glucosyltransferase, and uridine diphosphoglucose-ketone cyanohydrin glucosyltransferase.
