= Flavonol 7-O-beta-glucosyltransferase =

Class of enzymes

Identifiers
- EC no.: 2.4.1.237
- CAS no.: 83682-90-0

Databases
- BRENDA: enzyme data
- ExPASy: NiceZyme view
- KEGG: enzyme entry
- MetaCyc: metabolic pathway
- Rhea: reactions
- PDB structures: RCSB PDB PDBe PDBsum
Search
- PMC: articles
- PubMed: articles
- NCBI: proteins

Flavonol 7-O-beta-glucosyltransferase (EC 2.4.1.237) is an enzyme that catalyzes the general chemical reaction

UDP-glucose + a flavonol $\rightleftharpoons$ UDP + a flavonol 7-O-β-D-glucoside

The enzyme characterised from Chrysanthemum segetum uses UDP-glucose to transfer a glucose unit to a specific phenolic hydroxy group of a flavonol, giving the corresponding flavonol 7-O-β-D-glucoside, with uridine diphosphate (UDP) as a byproduct. For example, quercetin is converted to quercimeritrin:

quercetin
+ UDP-glucose
UDP
quercimeritrin

This enzyme belongs to the family of glycosyltransferases, specifically the hexosyltransferases. The systematic name of this enzyme class is UDP-glucose:flavonol 7-O-beta-D-glucosyltransferase. This enzyme is also called UDP-glucose:flavonol 7-O-glucosyltransferase.
