= N-acetylgalactosaminyl-proteoglycan 3-beta-glucuronosyltransferase =

Class of enzymes

Identifiers
- EC no.: 2.4.1.226
- CAS no.: 269077-98-7

Databases
- IntEnz: IntEnz view
- BRENDA: BRENDA entry
- ExPASy: NiceZyme view
- KEGG: KEGG entry
- MetaCyc: metabolic pathway
- PRIAM: profile
- PDB structures: RCSB PDB PDBe PDBsum
- Gene Ontology: AmiGO / QuickGO
Search
- PMC: articles
- PubMed: articles
- NCBI: proteins

In enzymology, a N-acetylgalactosaminyl-proteoglycan 3-beta-glucuronosyltransferase (EC 2.4.1.226) is an enzyme that catalyzes the chemical reaction

UDP-alpha-D-glucuronate + N-acetyl-beta-D-galactosaminyl-(1->4)-beta-D-glucuronosyl- proteoglycan $\rightleftharpoons$ UDP + beta-D-glucuronosyl-(1->3)-N-acetyl-beta-D-galactosaminyl-(1->4)- beta-D-glucuronosyl-proteoglycan

The 3 substrates of this enzyme are UDP-alpha-D-glucuronate, [[N-acetyl-beta-D-galactosaminyl-(1->4)-beta-D-glucuronosyl-]], and proteoglycan, whereas its 3 products are UDP, [[beta-D-glucuronosyl-(1->3)-N-acetyl-beta-D-galactosaminyl-(1->4)-]], and beta-D-glucuronosyl-proteoglycan.

This enzyme belongs to the family of glycosyltransferases, specifically the hexosyltransferases. The systematic name of this enzyme class is alpha-D-glucuronate:N-acetyl-beta-D-galactosaminyl-(1->4)-beta-D-glu curonosyl-proteoglycan 3-beta-glucuronosyltransferase. This enzyme is also called chondroitin glucuronyltransferase II. This enzyme participates in chondroitin sulfate biosynthesis and glycan structures - biosynthesis 1.
