= Lipopolysaccharide N-acetylmannosaminouronosyltransferase =

Class of enzymes

lipopolysaccharide N-acetylmannosaminouronosyltransferase

Identifiers
- EC no.: 2.4.1.180
- CAS no.: 113478-30-1

Databases
- IntEnz: IntEnz view
- BRENDA: BRENDA entry
- ExPASy: NiceZyme view
- KEGG: KEGG entry
- MetaCyc: metabolic pathway
- PRIAM: profile
- PDB structures: RCSB PDB PDBe PDBsum
- Gene Ontology: AmiGO / QuickGO
Search
- PMC: articles
- PubMed: articles
- NCBI: proteins

In enzymology, a lipopolysaccharide N-acetylmannosaminouronosyltransferase (EC 2.4.1.180) is an enzyme that catalyzes the chemical reaction

UDP-N-acetyl-beta-D-mannosaminouronate + lipopolysaccharide $\rightleftharpoons$ UDP + N-acetyl-beta-D-mannosaminouronosyl-1,4-lipopolysaccharide

Thus, the two substrates of this enzyme are UDP-N-acetyl-beta-D-mannosaminouronate and lipopolysaccharide, whereas its two products are UDP and N-acetyl-beta-D-mannosaminouronosyl-1,4-lipopolysaccharide.

This enzyme belongs to the family of glycosyltransferases, specifically the hexosyltransferases. The systematic name of this enzyme class is UDP-N-acetyl-beta-D-mannosaminouronate:lipopolysaccharide N-acetyl-beta-D-mannosaminouronosyltransferase. Other names in common use include ManNAcA transferase, uridine-diphosphoacetylmannosaminuronatetranferase, N-acetylglucosaminylpyrophosphorylundecaprenol glucosyltransferase, and acetylmannosaminuronosyltransferase.
