= Lipid-A-disaccharide synthase =

Class of enzymes

lipid-A-disaccharide synthase

Identifiers
- EC no.: 2.4.1.182
- CAS no.: 105843-81-0

Databases
- IntEnz: IntEnz view
- BRENDA: BRENDA entry
- ExPASy: NiceZyme view
- KEGG: KEGG entry
- MetaCyc: metabolic pathway
- PRIAM: profile
- PDB structures: RCSB PDB PDBe PDBsum
- Gene Ontology: AmiGO / QuickGO
Search
- PMC: articles
- PubMed: articles
- NCBI: proteins

In enzymology, a lipid-A-disaccharide synthase (EC 2.4.1.182) is an enzyme that catalyzes the chemical reaction

UDP-2,3-bis(3-hydroxytetradecanoyl)glucosamine + 2,3-bis(3-hydroxytetradecanoyl)-beta-D-glucosaminyl 1-phosphate $\rightleftharpoons$ UDP + 2,3-bis(3-hydroxytetradecanoyl)-D-glucosaminyl-1,6-beta-D-2,3-bis(3-hydroxytetradecanoyl)-beta-D-glucosaminyl 1-phosphate

Thus, the two substrates of this enzyme are UDP-2,3-bis(3-hydroxytetradecanoyl)glucosamine and 2,3-bis(3-hydroxytetradecanoyl)-beta-D-glucosaminyl 1-phosphate, whereas its 2 products are UDP and 2,3-bis(3-hydroxytetradecanoyl)-D-glucosaminyl-1,6-beta-D-2,3-bis(3-hydroxytetradecanoyl)-beta-D-glucosaminyl 1-phosphate.

This enzyme belongs to the family of glycosyltransferases, specifically the hexosyltransferases. The systematic name of this enzyme class is UDP-2,3-bis(3-hydroxytetradecanoyl)glucosamine:2,3-bis(3-hydroxytet radecanoyl)-beta-D-glucosaminyl-1-phosphate 2,3-bis(3-hydroxytetradecanoyl)-glucosaminyltransferase. This enzyme participates in lipopolysaccharide biosynthesis.
