= Indolylacetylinositol arabinosyltransferase =

Class of enzymes

indolylacetylinositol arabinosyltransferase

Identifiers
- EC no.: 2.4.2.34
- CAS no.: 84720-96-7

Databases
- IntEnz: IntEnz view
- BRENDA: BRENDA entry
- ExPASy: NiceZyme view
- KEGG: KEGG entry
- MetaCyc: metabolic pathway
- PRIAM: profile
- PDB structures: RCSB PDB PDBe PDBsum
- Gene Ontology: AmiGO / QuickGO
Search
- PMC: articles
- PubMed: articles
- NCBI: proteins

In enzymology, an indolylacetylinositol arabinosyltransferase (EC 2.4.2.34) is an enzyme that catalyzes the chemical reaction

UDP-L-arabinose + (indol-3-yl)acetyl-1D-myo-inositol $\rightleftharpoons$ UDP + (indol-3-yl)acetyl-myo-inositol 3-L-arabinoside

Thus, the two substrates of this enzyme are UDP-L-arabinose and indol-3-ylacetyl-1D-myo-inositol, whereas its two products are UDP and (indol-3-yl)acetyl-myo-inositol 3-L-arabinoside.

This enzyme belongs to the family of glycosyltransferases, specifically the pentosyltransferases. The systematic name of this enzyme class is UDP-L-arabinose:(indol-3-yl)acetyl-myo-inositol L-arabinosyltransferase. Other names in common use include arabinosylindolylacetylinositol synthase, UDP-L-arabinose:indol-3-ylacetyl-myo-inositol, and L-arabinosyltransferase.
