= Globotriaosylceramide 3-beta-N-acetylgalactosaminyltransferase =

Class of enzymes

galactosylgalactosylglucosylceramide beta-D-acetylgalactosaminyltransferase

Identifiers
- EC no.: 2.4.1.79
- CAS no.: 62213-46-1
- Alt. names: uridine, diphosphoacetylgalactosamine-galactosylgalactosylglucosylceramide, acetylgalactosaminyltransferase, globoside synthetase, UDP-N-acetylgalactosamine:globotriaosylceramide, beta-3-N-acetylgalactosaminyltransferase, galactosylgalactosylglucosylceramide, beta-D-acetylgalactosaminyltransferase, UDP-N-acetylgalactosamine:globotriaosylceramide, beta1,3-N-acetylgalactosaminyltransferase, globoside synthase, galactosylgalactosylglucosylceramide, beta-D-acetylgalactosaminyltransferase, UDP-N-acetyl-D-galactosamine:D-galactosyl-1,4-D-galactosyl-1,4-D-, glucosylceramide beta-N-acetyl-D-galactosaminyltransferase, beta3GalNAc-T1, UDP-N-acetyl-D-galactosamine:alpha-D-galactosyl-(1->4)-beta-D-, galactosyl-(1->4)-beta-D-glucosylceramide, 3III-beta-N-acetyl-D-galactosaminyltransferase, UDP-N-acetyl-D-galactosamine:alpha-D-galactosyl-(1->4)-beta-D-, galactosyl-(1->4)-beta-D-glucosyl-(11)-ceramide, 3III-beta-N-acetyl-D-galactosaminyltransferase

Databases
- IntEnz: IntEnz view
- BRENDA: BRENDA entry
- ExPASy: NiceZyme view
- KEGG: KEGG entry
- MetaCyc: metabolic pathway
- PRIAM: profile
- PDB structures: RCSB PDB PDBe PDBsum
- Gene Ontology: AmiGO / QuickGO
Search
- PMC: articles
- PubMed: articles
- NCBI: proteins

In enzymology, a globotriaosylceramide 3-beta-N-acetylgalactosaminyltransferase (EC 2.4.1.79) is an enzyme that catalyzes the chemical reaction

UDP-N-acetyl-D-galactosamine + alpha-D-galactosyl-(1->4)-beta-D-galactosyl-(1->4)-beta-D-glucosyl- (11)-ceramide $\rightleftharpoons$ UDP + N-acetyl-beta-D-galactosaminyl-(1->3)-alpha-D-galactosyl-(1->4)- beta-D-galactosyl-(1->4)-beta-D-glucosyl-(11)-ceramide

The 3 substrates of this enzyme are UDP-N-acetyl-D-galactosamine, [[alpha-D-galactosyl-(1->4)-beta-D-galactosyl-(1->4)-beta-D-glucosyl-]], and (11)-ceramide, whereas its 3 products are UDP, [[N-acetyl-beta-D-galactosaminyl-(1->3)-alpha-D-galactosyl-(1->4)-]], and [[beta-D-galactosyl-(1->4)-beta-D-glucosyl-(11)-ceramide]].

Wrongly characterized previously as globotriosylceramide beta-1,6-N-acetylgalactosaminyl-transferase (EC 2.4.1.154

This enzyme belongs to the family of glycosyltransferases, specifically the hexosyltransferases. The systematic name of this enzyme class is UDP-N-acetyl-D-galactosamine:alpha-D-galactosyl-(1->4)-beta-D-galact osyl-(1->4)-beta-D-glucosyl-(11)-ceramide III3-beta-N-acetyl-D-galactosaminyltransferase. This enzyme participates in glycosphingolipid biosynthesis - globoseries and glycan structures - biosynthesis 2.
