= Luteolin-7-O-diglucuronide 4'-O-glucuronosyltransferase =

Class of enzymes

Identifiers
- EC no.: 2.4.1.191
- CAS no.: 115490-50-1

Databases
- IntEnz: IntEnz view
- BRENDA: BRENDA entry
- ExPASy: NiceZyme view
- KEGG: KEGG entry
- MetaCyc: metabolic pathway
- PRIAM: profile
- PDB structures: RCSB PDB PDBe PDBsum
- Gene Ontology: AmiGO / QuickGO
Search
- PMC: articles
- PubMed: articles
- NCBI: proteins

Luteolin-7-O-diglucuronide 4'-O-glucuronosyltransferase (EC 2.4.1.191) is an enzyme that catalyzes a chemical reaction which converts a luteolin di-glucuronide, luteolin 7-O-(β-D-glucuronosyl-(1→2)-β-D-glucuronide, into a specific triglucuronide with the chemical name luteolin 7-O-[beta-D-glucuronosyl-(1->2)-beta-D-glucuronide]-4'-O-beta-D-glucuronide. The enzyme characterised from the leaves of Secale cereale transfers the third sugar acid from UDP-glucuronate, giving uridine diphosphate (UDP) as a byproduct.

luteolin 7-O-(β-D-glucuronosyl-(1→2)-β-D-glucuronide)
+ UDP-glucuronate
UDP
luteolin triglucuronide

This enzyme belongs to the family of glycosyltransferases, specifically the hexosyltransferases. The systematic name of this enzyme class is UDP-glucuronate:luteolin-7-O-beta-D-diglucuronide 4'-O-glucuronosyltransferase. Other names in common use include uridine diphosphoglucuronate-luteolin 7-O-diglucuronide, glucuronosyltransferase, UDP-glucuronate:luteolin 7-O-diglucuronide-glucuronosyltransferase, UDPglucuronate:luteolin, 7-O-diglucuronide-4'-O-glucuronosyl-transferase, and LDT.
