= UDP-glucose 4,6-dehydratase =

Class of enzymes

Identifiers
- EC no.: 4.2.1.76
- CAS no.: 68189-53-7

Databases
- IntEnz: IntEnz view
- BRENDA: BRENDA entry
- ExPASy: NiceZyme view
- KEGG: KEGG entry
- MetaCyc: metabolic pathway
- PRIAM: profile
- PDB structures: RCSB PDB PDBe PDBsum
- Gene Ontology: AmiGO / QuickGO
Search
- PMC: articles
- PubMed: articles
- NCBI: proteins

The enzyme UDP-glucose 4,6-dehydratase (EC 4.2.1.76) catalyzes the chemical reaction

UDP-glucose $\rightleftharpoons$ UDP-4-dehydro-6-deoxy-D-glucose + H_{2}O

This enzyme belongs to the family of lyases, specifically the hydro-lyases, which cleave carbon-oxygen bonds. The systematic name of this enzyme class is UDP-glucose 4,6-hydro-lyase (UDP-4-dehydro-6-deoxy-D-glucose-forming). Other names in common use include UDP-D-glucose-4,6-hydrolyase, UDP-D-glucose oxidoreductase, and UDP-glucose 4,6-hydro-lyase. This enzyme participates in nucleotide sugars metabolism.
