= Alpha-1,4-glucan-protein synthase (ADP-forming) =

Class of enzymes

alpha-1,4-glucan-protein synthase (ADP-forming)

Identifiers
- EC no.: 2.4.1.113
- CAS no.: 67053-99-0

Databases
- IntEnz: IntEnz view
- BRENDA: BRENDA entry
- ExPASy: NiceZyme view
- KEGG: KEGG entry
- MetaCyc: metabolic pathway
- PRIAM: profile
- PDB structures: RCSB PDB PDBe PDBsum
- Gene Ontology: AmiGO / QuickGO
Search
- PMC: articles
- PubMed: articles
- NCBI: proteins

In enzymology, an alpha-1,4-glucan-protein synthase (ADP-forming) (EC 2.4.1.113) is an enzyme that catalyzes the chemical reaction

ADP-glucose + protein $\rightleftharpoons$ ADP + alpha-D-glucosyl-protein

Thus, the two substrates of this enzyme are ADP-glucose and protein, whereas its two products are ADP and alpha-D-glucosyl-protein.

This enzyme belongs to the family of glycosyltransferases, specifically the hexosyltransferases. The systematic name of this enzyme class is ADP-glucose:protein 4-alpha-D-glucosyltransferase. Other names in common use include ADP-glucose:protein glucosyltransferase, and adenosine diphosphoglucose-protein glucosyltransferase.
