= DTDP-6-deoxy-L-talose 4-dehydrogenase =

dTDP-6-deoxy-L-talose 4-dehydrogenase

Identifiers
- EC no.: 1.1.1.134
- CAS no.: 37250-65-0

Databases
- IntEnz: IntEnz view
- BRENDA: BRENDA entry
- ExPASy: NiceZyme view
- KEGG: KEGG entry
- MetaCyc: metabolic pathway
- PRIAM: profile
- PDB structures: RCSB PDB PDBe PDBsum
- Gene Ontology: AmiGO / QuickGO
Search
- PMC: articles
- PubMed: articles
- NCBI: proteins

In enzymology, a dTDP-6-deoxy-L-talose 4-dehydrogenase (EC 1.1.1.134) is an enzyme that catalyzes the chemical reaction

dTDP-6-deoxy-L-talose + NADP^{+} $\rightleftharpoons$ dTDP-4-dehydro-6-deoxy-L-mannose + NADPH + H^{+}

Thus, the two substrates of this enzyme are dTDP-6-deoxy-L-talose and NADP^{+}, whereas its 3 products are dTDP-4-dehydro-6-deoxy-L-mannose, NADPH, and H^{+}.

This enzyme belongs to the family of oxidoreductases, specifically those acting on the CH-OH group of donor with NAD^{+} or NADP^{+} as acceptor. The systematic name of this enzyme class is dTDP-6-deoxy-L-talose:NADP^{+} 4-oxidoreductase. Other names in common use include thymidine diphospho-6-deoxy-L-talose dehydrogenase, TDP-6-deoxy-L-talose dehydrogenase, thymidine diphospho-6-deoxy-L-talose dehydrogenase, and dTDP-6-deoxy-L-talose dehydrogenase (4-reductase). This enzyme participates in nucleotide sugars metabolism.
