= DTDP-4-dehydrorhamnose reductase =

Enzyme

dTDP-4-dehydrorhamnose reductase

Identifiers
- EC no.: 1.1.1.133
- CAS no.: 37250-64-9

Databases
- BRENDA: enzyme data
- ExPASy: NiceZyme view
- KEGG: enzyme entry
- MetaCyc: metabolic pathway
- Rhea: reactions
- PDB structures: RCSB PDB PDBe PDBsum
- Gene Ontology: AmiGO / QuickGO
Search
- PMC: articles
- PubMed: articles
- NCBI: proteins

In enzymology, a dTDP-4-dehydrorhamnose reductase (EC 1.1.1.133) is an enzyme that catalyzes the chemical reaction

dTDP-6-deoxy-L-mannose + NADP^{+} $\rightleftharpoons$ dTDP-4-dehydro-6-deoxy-L-mannose + NADPH + H^{+}

Thus, the two substrates of this enzyme are dTDP-6-deoxy-L-mannose and NADP^{+}, whereas its 3 products are dTDP-4-dehydro-6-deoxy-L-mannose, NADPH, and H^{+}.

This enzyme belongs to the family of oxidoreductases, specifically those acting on the CH-OH group of donor with NAD^{+} or NADP^{+} as acceptor. The systematic name of this enzyme class is dTDP-6-deoxy-L-mannose:NADP^{+} 4-oxidoreductase. Other names in common use include dTDP-4-keto-L-rhamnose reductase, reductase, thymidine diphospho-4-ketorhamnose, dTDP-4-ketorhamnose reductase, TDP-4-keto-rhamnose reductase, and thymidine diphospho-4-ketorhamnose reductase. This enzyme participates in 3 metabolic pathways: nucleotide sugars metabolism, streptomycin biosynthesis, and polyketide sugar unit biosynthesis.

== Structural studies ==
As of late 2007, 5 structures have been solved for this class of enzymes, with PDB accession codes PDB: 1KBZ, PDB: 1KC1, PDB: 1KC3, PDB: 1N2S, and PDB: 2GGS.
