= Galacturonokinase =

Identifiers
- EC no.: 2.7.1.44
- CAS no.: 9026-63-5

Databases
- IntEnz: IntEnz view
- BRENDA: BRENDA entry
- ExPASy: NiceZyme view
- KEGG: KEGG entry
- MetaCyc: metabolic pathway
- PRIAM: profile
- PDB structures: RCSB PDB PDBe PDBsum
- Gene Ontology: AmiGO / QuickGO
Search
- PMC: articles
- PubMed: articles
- NCBI: proteins

Galacturonokinase (EC 2.7.1.44) is an enzyme that catalyzes the chemical reaction

ATP +
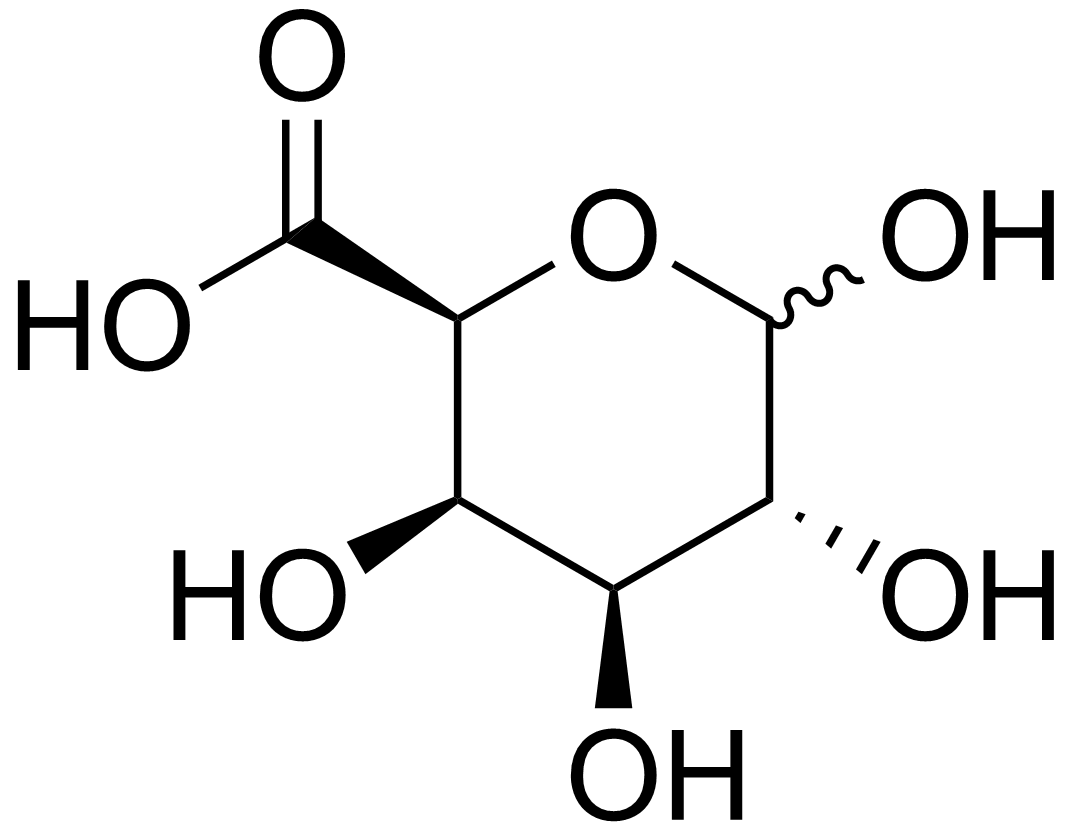
D-galacturonic acid
ADP +
1-phospho-α-D-galacturonic acid

The enzyme characterised from mung bean converts D-galacturonic acid to 1-phospho-α-D-galacturonic acid by transferring a phosphate group from the cofactor, adenosine triphosphate (ATP), which is converted to adenosine diphosphate (ADP).

This enzyme is a transferase, specifically one transferring phosphorus-containing groups (phosphotransferases) with an alcohol group as acceptor. The systematic name of this enzyme class is ATP:D-galacturonate 1-phosphotransferase. This enzyme is also called galacturonokinase (phosphorylating) D-galacturonic acid kinase. It participates in the metabolism of nucleotide sugars.
