= UTP—xylose-1-phosphate uridylyltransferase =

Class of enzymes

UTP:xylose-1-phosphate uridylyltransferase

Identifiers
- EC no.: 2.7.7.11
- CAS no.: 9026-20-4

Databases
- IntEnz: IntEnz view
- BRENDA: BRENDA entry
- ExPASy: NiceZyme view
- KEGG: KEGG entry
- MetaCyc: metabolic pathway
- PRIAM: profile
- PDB structures: RCSB PDB PDBe PDBsum
- Gene Ontology: AmiGO / QuickGO
Search
- PMC: articles
- PubMed: articles
- NCBI: proteins

In enzymology, an UTP—xylose-1-phosphate uridylyltransferase (EC 2.7.7.11) is an enzyme that catalyzes the chemical reaction

UTP + alpha-D-xylose 1-phosphate $\rightleftharpoons$ diphosphate + UDP-xylose

Thus, the two substrates of this enzyme are UTP and alpha-D-xylose 1-phosphate, whereas its two products are diphosphate and UDP-xylose.

This enzyme belongs to the family of transferases, specifically those transferring phosphorus-containing nucleotide groups (nucleotidyltransferases). The systematic name of this enzyme class is UTP:alpha-D-xylose-1-phosphate uridylyltransferase. Other names in common use include xylose-1-phosphate uridylyltransferase, uridylyltransferase, xylose 1-phosphate, UDP-xylose pyrophosphorylase, uridine diphosphoxylose pyrophosphorylase, and xylose 1-phosphate uridylyltransferase. This enzyme participates in nucleotide sugars metabolism.
