= C17H27N3O17P2 =

The molecular formula C_{17}H_{27}N_{3}O_{17}P_{2} (molar mass: 607.354 g/mol) may refer to:

- Uridine diphosphate N-acetylgalactosamine
- Uridine diphosphate N-acetylglucosamine
