= Aldose-1-phosphate nucleotidyltransferase =

aldose-1-phosphate nucleotidyltransferase

Identifiers
- EC no.: 2.7.7.37
- CAS no.: 9033-61-8

Databases
- IntEnz: IntEnz view
- BRENDA: BRENDA entry
- ExPASy: NiceZyme view
- KEGG: KEGG entry
- MetaCyc: metabolic pathway
- PRIAM: profile
- PDB structures: RCSB PDB PDBe PDBsum
- Gene Ontology: AmiGO / QuickGO
Search
- PMC: articles
- PubMed: articles
- NCBI: proteins

In enzymology, an aldose-1-phosphate nucleotidyltransferase (EC 2.7.7.37) is an enzyme that catalyzes the chemical reaction

NDP + alpha-D-aldose 1-phosphate $\rightleftharpoons$ phosphate + NDP-aldose

Thus, the two substrates of this enzyme are NDP and alpha-D-aldose 1-phosphate, whereas its two products are phosphate and NDP-aldose.

This enzyme belongs to the family of transferases, specifically those transferring phosphorus-containing nucleotide groups (nucleotidyltransferases). The systematic name of this enzyme class is NDP:alpha-D-aldose-1-phosphate nucleotidyltransferase. Other names in common use include sugar-1-phosphate nucleotidyltransferase, NDPaldose phosphorylase, glucose 1-phosphate inosityltransferase, NDP sugar phosphorylase, nucleoside diphosphosugar phosphorylase, sugar phosphate nucleotidyltransferase, nucleoside diphosphate sugar:orthophosphate nucleotidyltransferase, sugar nucleotide phosphorylase, and NDP:aldose-1-phosphate nucleotidyltransferase. This enzyme participates in nucleotide sugars metabolism.
