= 1,3-beta-oligoglucan phosphorylase =

Class of enzymes

Identifiers
- EC no.: 2.4.1.30
- CAS no.: 37257-28-6

Databases
- IntEnz: IntEnz view
- BRENDA: BRENDA entry
- ExPASy: NiceZyme view
- KEGG: KEGG entry
- MetaCyc: metabolic pathway
- PRIAM: profile
- PDB structures: RCSB PDB PDBe PDBsum
- Gene Ontology: AmiGO / QuickGO
Search
- PMC: articles
- PubMed: articles
- NCBI: proteins

In enzymology, a 1,3-beta-oligoglucan phosphorylase (EC 2.4.1.30) is an enzyme that catalyzes the chemical reaction

(1,3-beta-D-glucosyl)n + phosphate $\rightleftharpoons$ (1,3-beta-D-glucosyl)n-1 + alpha-D-glucose 1-phosphate

Thus, the two substrates of this enzyme are (1,3-beta-D-glucosyl)n and phosphate, whereas its two products are (1,3-beta-D-glucosyl)n-1 and alpha-D-glucose 1-phosphate.

This enzyme belongs to the family of glycosyltransferases, specifically the hexosyltransferases. The systematic name of this enzyme class is 1,3-beta-D-oligoglucan:phosphate alpha-D-glucosyltransferase. Other names in common use include beta-1,3-oligoglucan:orthophosphate glucosyltransferase II, and beta-1,3-oligoglucan phosphorylase.
