= MGAT5 =

Protein-coding gene in the species Homo sapiens

Identifiers
- Aliases: MGAT5, GNT-V, GNT-VA, mannosyl (alpha-1,6-)-glycoprotein beta-1,6-N-acetyl-glucosaminyltransferase, alpha-1,6-mannosylglycoprotein 6-beta-N-acetylglucosaminyltransferase, MGAT5A, glcNAc-T V
- External IDs: OMIM: 601774; MGI: 894701; GeneCards: MGAT5
Enzyme activity
EC #	BRENDA	ExPASy	KEGG	MetaCyc
2.4.1.155	↗	↗	↗	↗

Gene location (Human)
Chr.	Chromosome 2 (human)
Band	2q21.2-q21.3	Start	134,119,983 bp
Band	2q21.2-q21.3	End	134,454,621 bp

Gene location (Mouse)
Chr.	Chromosome 1 (mouse)
Band	1|1 E3	Start	127,132,752 bp
Band	1|1 E3	End	127,416,073 bp
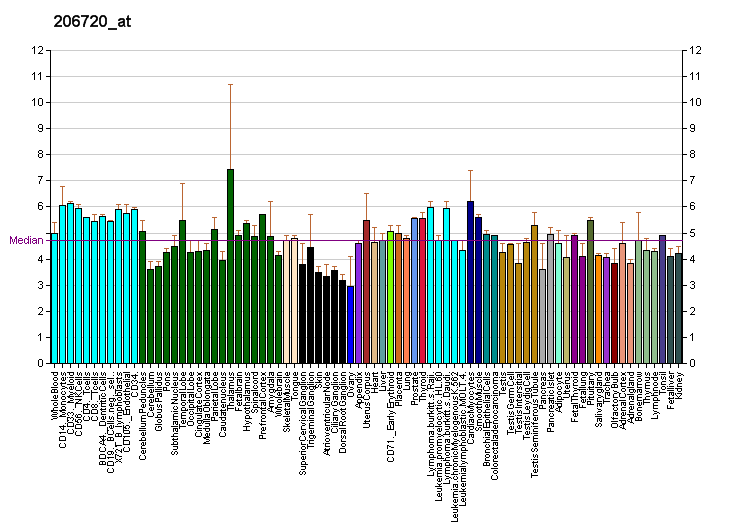
RNA expression pattern
Bgee	Human / Mouse (ortholog); Top expressed in: glomerulus; metanephric glomerulus; middle temporal gyrus; Brodmann area 23; tibia; pons; cardiac muscle tissue of right atrium; pars reticulata; bronchial epithelial cell; myocardium of left ventricle / Top expressed in: Paneth cell; renal corpuscle; medial geniculate nucleus; molar; pontine nuclei; lateral geniculate nucleus; pituitary gland; median eminence; habenula; substantia nigra; More reference expression data
BioGPS	More reference expression data
Gene ontology
Molecular function	transferase activity; acetylglucosaminyltransferase activity; glycosyltransferase activity; alpha-1,6-mannosylglycoprotein 6-beta-N-acetylglucosaminyltransferase activity; protein phosphatase inhibitor activity; manganese ion binding
Cellular component	integral component of membrane; Golgi membrane; extracellular exosome; membrane; Golgi apparatus; extracellular region
Biological process	protein glycosylation; protein N-linked glycosylation; protein N-linked glycosylation via asparagine; positive regulation of cell migration; negative regulation of protein tyrosine phosphatase activity; positive regulation of receptor signaling pathway via STAT
Sources:Amigo / QuickGO
Orthologs
Databases	NCBI: entry; OMA: entry
Species	Human	Mouse
Entrez	4249	107895
Ensembl	ENSG00000152127	ENSMUSG00000036155
UniProt	Q09328	Q8R4G6
RefSeq (mRNA)	NM_002410; NM_001371457	NM_145128
RefSeq (protein)	NP_002401; NP_001358386	NP_660110
Location (UCSC)	Chr 2: 134.12 – 134.45 Mb	Chr 1: 127.13 – 127.42 Mb
PubMed search
- Wikidata
View/Edit Human	View/Edit Mouse

Alpha-1,6-mannosylglycoprotein 6-beta-N-acetylglucosaminyltransferase A is an enzyme that in humans is encoded by the MGAT5 gene.

This gene encodes mannosyl (alpha-1,6-)-glycoprotein beta-1,6-N-acetyl-glucosaminyltransferase, a glycosyltransferase involved in the synthesis of protein-bound and lipid-bound oligosaccharides. Alterations of the oligosaccharides on cell surface glycoproteins cause significant changes in the adhesive or migratory behavior of a cell. Increase in the encoded protein's activity may correlate with the progression of invasive malignancies.
