= Aldose beta-D-fructosyltransferase =

Class of enzymes

aldose beta-D-fructosyltransferase

Identifiers
- EC no.: 2.4.1.162
- CAS no.: 9031-67-8

Databases
- IntEnz: IntEnz view
- BRENDA: BRENDA entry
- ExPASy: NiceZyme view
- KEGG: KEGG entry
- MetaCyc: metabolic pathway
- PRIAM: profile
- PDB structures: RCSB PDB PDBe PDBsum
- Gene Ontology: AmiGO / QuickGO
Search
- PMC: articles
- PubMed: articles
- NCBI: proteins

In enzymology, an aldose beta-D-fructosyltransferase (EC 2.4.1.162) is an enzyme that catalyzes the chemical reaction

alpha-D-aldosyl_{1} beta-D-fructoside + D-aldose_{2} $\rightleftharpoons$ D-aldose_{1} + alpha-D-aldosyl_{2} beta-D-fructoside

Thus, the two substrates of this enzyme are alpha-D-aldosyl1 beta-D-fructoside and D-aldose2, whereas its two products are D-aldose1 and alpha-D-aldosyl2 beta-D-fructoside.

This enzyme belongs to the family of glycosyltransferases, specifically the hexosyltransferases. The systematic name of this enzyme class is alpha-D-aldosyl-beta-D-fructoside:aldose 1-beta-D-fructosyltransferase.
