= UDP-glucuronate 5'-epimerase =

Class of enzymes

Identifiers
- EC no.: 5.1.3.12
- CAS no.: 37318-38-0

Databases
- IntEnz: IntEnz view
- BRENDA: BRENDA entry
- ExPASy: NiceZyme view
- KEGG: KEGG entry
- MetaCyc: metabolic pathway
- PRIAM: profile
- PDB structures: RCSB PDB PDBe PDBsum
- Gene Ontology: AmiGO / QuickGO
Search
- PMC: articles
- PubMed: articles
- NCBI: proteins

In enzymology, an UDP-glucuronate 5'-epimerase (EC 5.1.3.12) is an enzyme that catalyzes the chemical reaction

UDP-glucuronate $\rightleftharpoons$ UDP-L-iduronate

Hence, this enzyme has one substrate, UDP-glucuronate, and one product, UDP-L-iduronate.

This enzyme belongs to the family of isomerases, specifically those racemases and epimerases acting on carbohydrates and derivatives. The systematic name of this enzyme class is UDP-glucuronate 5'-epimerase. Other names in common use include uridine diphosphoglucuronate 5'-epimerase, UDP-glucuronic acid 5'-epimerase, and C-5-uronosyl epimerase. This enzyme participates in nucleotide sugars metabolism. It employs one cofactor, NAD+.
