= CDP-glucose 4,6-dehydratase =

Enzyme

Identifiers
- EC no.: 4.2.1.45
- CAS no.: 37259-55-5

Databases
- IntEnz: IntEnz view
- BRENDA: BRENDA entry
- ExPASy: NiceZyme view
- KEGG: KEGG entry
- MetaCyc: metabolic pathway
- PRIAM: profile
- PDB structures: RCSB PDB PDBe PDBsum
- Gene Ontology: AmiGO / QuickGO
Search
- PMC: articles
- PubMed: articles
- NCBI: proteins

The enzyme CDP-glucose 4,6-dehydratase (EC 4.2.1.45) catalyzes the chemical reaction

CDP-glucose $\rightleftharpoons$ CDP-4-dehydro-6-deoxy-D-glucose + H_{2}O

This enzyme belongs to the family of lyases, specifically the hydro-lyases, which cleave carbon-oxygen bonds. This enzyme participates in starch and sucrose metabolism. It employs one cofactor, NAD^{+}.

== Nomenclature ==
The systematic name of this enzyme class is CDP-glucose 4,6-hydro-lyase (CDP-4-dehydro-6-deoxy-D-glucose-forming). Other names in common use include:

- cytidine diphosphoglucose oxidoreductase, and
- CDP-glucose 4,6-hydro-lyase.

== Structural studies ==
As of late 2007, two structures have been solved for this class of enzymes, with PDB accession codes 1RKX and 1WVG.
