= Dextrin dextranase =

Class of enzymes

dextrin dextranase

Identifiers
- EC no.: 2.4.1.2
- CAS no.: 9032-13-7

Databases
- IntEnz: IntEnz view
- BRENDA: BRENDA entry
- ExPASy: NiceZyme view
- KEGG: KEGG entry
- MetaCyc: metabolic pathway
- PRIAM: profile
- PDB structures: RCSB PDB PDBe PDBsum
- Gene Ontology: AmiGO / QuickGO
Search
- PMC: articles
- PubMed: articles
- NCBI: proteins

In enzymology, a dextrin dextranase (EC 2.4.1.2) is an enzyme that catalyzes the chemical reaction

(1,4-alpha-D-glucosyl)n + (1,6-alpha-D-glucosyl)m $\rightleftharpoons$ (1,4-alpha-D-glucosyl)n-1 + (1,6-alpha-D-glucosyl)m^{+}1

Thus, the two substrates of this enzyme are (1,4-alpha-D-glucosyl)n and (1,6-alpha-D-glucosyl)m, whereas its two products are (1,4-alpha-D-glucosyl)n-1 and (1,6-alpha-D-glucosyl)m+1.

This enzyme belongs to the family of glycosyltransferases, specifically the hexosyltransferases. The systematic name of this enzyme class is 1,4-alpha-D-glucan:1,6-alpha-D-glucan 6-alpha-D-glucosyltransferase. Other names in common use include dextrin 6-glucosyltransferase, and dextran dextrinase. If the enzyme predominantly catalyzes the synthesis of dextran from dextrin, the name "dextran dextrinase" is considered more appropriate.

In 2025, the three-dimensional structure of dextran dextrinase from Gluconobacter oxydans was reported. The enzyme shows a strong structural similarity to glucoamylases and glucodextranases, which hydrolyze dextrin and dextran. However, a spatial shift of about 1.5 Å in the catalytic residues enables dextran dextrinase to catalyze transglucosylation reactions.
