= DTDP-galactose 6-dehydrogenase =

Class of enzymes

dTDP-galactose 6-dehydrogenase

Identifiers
- EC no.: 1.1.1.186

Databases
- IntEnz: IntEnz view
- BRENDA: BRENDA entry
- ExPASy: NiceZyme view
- KEGG: KEGG entry
- MetaCyc: metabolic pathway
- PRIAM: profile
- PDB structures: RCSB PDB PDBe PDBsum
Search
- PMC: articles
- PubMed: articles
- NCBI: proteins

In enzymology, a dTDP-galactose 6-dehydrogenase (EC 1.1.1.186) is an enzyme that catalyzes the chemical reaction

dTDP-D-galactose + 2 NADP^{+} + H_{2}O $\rightleftharpoons$ dTDP-D-galacturonate + 2 NADPH + 2 H^{+}

The 3 substrates of this enzyme are dTDP-D-galactose, NADP^{+}, and H_{2}O, whereas its 3 products are dTDP-D-galacturonate, NADPH, and H^{+}.

This enzyme belongs to the family of oxidoreductases, specifically those acting on the CH-OH group of donor with NAD^{+} or NADP^{+} as acceptor. The systematic name of this enzyme class is dTDP-D-galactose:NADP^{+} 6-oxidoreductase. This enzyme is also called thymidine-diphosphate-galactose dehydrogenase. This enzyme participates in nucleotide sugars metabolism.
