= Amylosucrase =

Class of enzymes

amylosucrase

Identifiers
- EC no.: 2.4.1.4
- CAS no.: 9032-11-5

Databases
- BRENDA: enzyme data
- ExPASy: NiceZyme view
- KEGG: enzyme entry
- MetaCyc: metabolic pathway
- Rhea: reactions
- PDB structures: RCSB PDB PDBe PDBsum
- Gene Ontology: AmiGO / QuickGO
Search
- PMC: articles
- PubMed: articles
- NCBI: proteins

In enzymology, an amylosucrase (EC 2.4.1.4) is an enzyme that catalyzes the chemical reaction

sucrose + (1,4-alpha-D-glucosyl)n $\rightleftharpoons$ D-fructose + (1,4-alpha-D-glucosyl)n^{+}1

Thus, the two substrates of this enzyme are sucrose and (1,4-alpha-D-glucosyl)n, whereas its two products are D-fructose and (1,4-alpha-D-glucosyl)n+1.

This enzyme belongs to the family of glycosyltransferases, specifically the hexosyltransferases. The systematic name of this enzyme class is sucrose:1,4-alpha-D-glucan 4-alpha-D-glucosyltransferase. Other names in common use include sucrose-glucan glucosyltransferase, and sucrose-1,4-alpha-glucan glucosyltransferase. This enzyme participates in starch and sucrose metabolism.

== Structural studies ==
As of late 2007, 10 structures have been solved for this class of enzymes, with PDB accession codes PDB: 1G5A, PDB: 1JG9, PDB: 1JGI, PDB: 1MVY, PDB: 1MW0, PDB: 1MW1, PDB: 1MW2, PDB: 1MW3, PDB: 1S46, and PDB: 1ZS2.
