= Dioxotetrahydropyrimidine phosphoribosyltransferase =

Class of enzymes

dioxotetrahydropyrimidine phosphoribosyltransferase

Identifiers
- EC no.: 2.4.2.20
- CAS no.: 37277-75-1

Databases
- IntEnz: IntEnz view
- BRENDA: BRENDA entry
- ExPASy: NiceZyme view
- KEGG: KEGG entry
- MetaCyc: metabolic pathway
- PRIAM: profile
- PDB structures: RCSB PDB PDBe PDBsum
- Gene Ontology: AmiGO / QuickGO
Search
- PMC: articles
- PubMed: articles
- NCBI: proteins

In enzymology, a dioxotetrahydropyrimidine phosphoribosyltransferase (EC 2.4.2.20) is an enzyme that catalyzes the chemical reaction

a 2,4-dioxotetrahydropyrimidine D-ribonucleotide + diphosphate $\rightleftharpoons$ a 2,4-dioxotetrahydropyrimidine + 5-phospho-alpha-D-ribose 1-diphosphate

Thus, the two substrates of this enzyme are 2,4-dioxotetrahydropyrimidine D-ribonucleotide and diphosphate, whereas its two products are 2,4-dioxotetrahydropyrimidine and 5-phospho-alpha-D-ribose 1-diphosphate.

This enzyme belongs to the family of glycosyltransferases, specifically the pentosyltransferases. The systematic name of this enzyme class is 2,4-dioxotetrahydropyrimidine-nucleotide:diphosphate phospho-alpha-D-ribosyltransferase. Other names in common use include dioxotetrahydropyrimidine-ribonucleotide pyrophosphorylase, dioxotetrahydropyrimidine phosphoribosyl transferase, and dioxotetrahydropyrimidine ribonucleotide pyrophosphorylase.
