= Uridine diphosphate N-acetylgalactosamine =

Chemical compound

Names
- IUPAC name Uridine 5′-(2-acetamido-2-deoxy-α-D-galactopyranosyl dihydrogen diphosphate)
- Systematic IUPAC name O^{1}-[(2R,3R,4R,5R,6R)-3-Acetamido-4,5-dihydroxy-6-(hydroxymethyl)oxan-2-yl] O^{3}-{[(2R,3S,4R,5R)-5-(2,4-dioxo-3,4-dihydropyrimidin-1(2H)-yl)-3,4-dihydroxyoxolan-2-yl]methyl} dihydrogen diphosphate
- Other names UDP-N-acetylgalactosamine; UDP-GalNAc

Identifiers
CAS Number	7277-98-7
3D model (JSmol)	Interactive image
ChEBI	CHEBI:16650
ChemSpider	4925346
IUPHAR/BPS	4741
KEGG	C00203; G10611
PubChem CID	1167
CompTox Dashboard (EPA)	DTXSID201318824
- InChI: InChI=1S/C17H27N3O17P2/c1-6(22)18-10-13(26)11(24)7(4-21)35-16(10)36-39(31,32)37-38(29,30)33-5-8-12(25)14(27)15(34-8)20-3-2-9(23)19-17(20)28/h2-3,7-8,10-16,21,24-27H,4-5H2,1H3,(H,18,22)(H,29,30)(H,31,32)(H,19,23,28) Key: LFTYTUAZOPRMMI-UHFFFAOYSA-N
- SMILES: CC(=O)N[C@@H]1[C@H]([C@H]([C@H](O[C@@H]1OP(=O)(O)OP(=O)(O)OC[C@@H]2[C@H]([C@H]([C@@H](O2)N3C=CC(=O)NC3=O)O)O)CO)O)O

Properties
Chemical formula	C_{17}H_{27}N_{3}O_{17}P_{2}
Molar mass	607.355 g·mol^{−1}
- Except where otherwise noted, data are given for materials in their standard state (at 25 °C [77 °F], 100 kPa). (what is ?) Infobox references

Uridine diphosphate N-acetylgalactosamine or UDP-GalNAc is a nucleotide sugar composed of uridine diphosphate (UDP) and N-acetyl galactosamine (GalNAc). It is used by glycosyltransferases to transfer N-acetylgalactosamine residues to substrates. UDP-GalNAc is an important building block for the production of glycoproteins and glycolipids in the body. It also serves as a precursor for the synthesis of mucin-type O-glycans, which are important components of mucus and play important roles in biological processes such as cell signaling, immune defense, and lubrication of the digestive tract.

== See also ==
- Galactosamine
- Galactose
- Globoside
- (N-Acetylglucosamine) GlcNAc
