= Nucleotide sugar =

Nucleotide sugars (also known as sugar nucleotides) are the activated forms of monosaccharides. Nucleotide sugars act as glycosyl donors in glycosylation reactions. Those reactions are catalyzed by a group of enzymes called glycosyltransferases.

== History ==
The anabolism of oligosaccharides - and, hence, the role of nucleotide sugars - was not clear until the 1950s when Leloir and his coworkers found that the key enzymes in this process are the glycosyltransferases. These enzymes transfer a glycosyl group from a sugar nucleotide to an acceptor.

== Biological importance and energetics ==
To act as glycosyl donors, those monosaccharides should exist in a highly energetic form. This occurs as a result of a reaction between nucleoside triphosphate (NTP) and glycosyl monophosphate (phosphate at anomeric carbon). The recent discovery of the reversibility of many glycosyltransferase-catalyzed reactions calls into question the designation of sugar nucleotides as 'activated' donors.

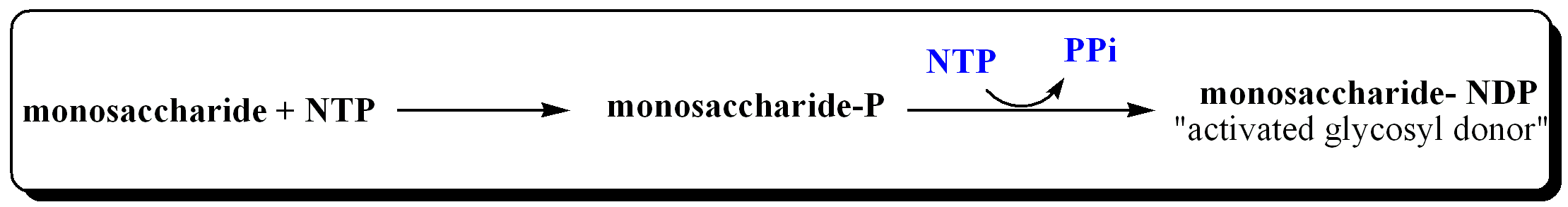
Activation of Monosaccharides

== Types ==
There are nine sugar nucleotides in humans which act as glycosyl donors and they can be classified depending on the type of the nucleoside forming them:

- Uridine Diphosphate: UDP-α-D-Glc, UDP-α-D-Gal, UDP-α-D-GalNAc, UDP-α-D-GlcNAc, UDP-α-D-GlcA, UDP-α-D-Xyl
- Guanosine Diphosphate: GDP-α-D-Man, GDP-β-L-Fuc.
- Cytidine Monophosphate: CMP-β-D-Neu5Ac; in humans, it is the only nucleotide sugar in the form of nucleotide monophosphate.
- Cytidine Diphosphate: CDP-D-Ribitol (i.e. CMP-[ribitol phosphate]); though not a sugar, the phosphorylated sugar alcohol ribitol phosphate is incorporated into matriglycan as if it were a monosaccharide.

In other forms of life many other sugars are used and various donors are utilized for them. All five of the common nucleosides are used as a base for a nucleotide sugar donor somewhere in nature. As examples, CDP-glucose and TDP-glucose give rise to various other forms of CDP and TDP-sugar donor nucleotides.

== Structures ==
Listed below are the structures of some nucleotide sugars (one example from each type).

UDP-Gal	CMP-NeuNAc	GDP-Man
UDP-Gal	CMP-Neu5Ac	GDP-Man

== Relationship to disease ==
Normal metabolism of nucleotide sugars is very important. Any malfunction in any contributing enzyme will lead to a certain disease for example:

1. Inclusion body myopathy: is a congenital disease resulted from altered function of UDP-GlcNAc epimerase .
2. Macular corneal dystrophy: is a congenital disease resulted from malfunction of GlcNAc-6-sulfotransferase.
3. Congenital disorder in α-1,3 mannosyl transferase will result in a variety of clinical symptoms, e.g. hypotonia, psychomotor retardation, liver fibrosis and various feeding problems.

== Relationship to drug discovery ==
The development of chemoenzymatic strategies to generate large libraries of non-native sugar nucleotides has enabled a process referred to as glycorandomization where these sugar nucleotide libraries serve as donors for permissive glycosyltransferases to afford differential glycosylation of a wide range of pharmaceuticals and complex natural product-based leads.

== See also ==
- Carbohydrate chemistry
- EamA
- Glycorandomization
- Glycosyltransferase
- Nucleotide sugars metabolism
