= Glucose-1-phosphate cytidylyltransferase =

Class of enzymes

Identifiers
- EC no.: 2.7.7.33
- CAS no.: 9027-10-5

Databases
- IntEnz: IntEnz view
- BRENDA: BRENDA entry
- ExPASy: NiceZyme view
- KEGG: KEGG entry
- MetaCyc: metabolic pathway
- PRIAM: profile
- PDB structures: RCSB PDB PDBe PDBsum
- Gene Ontology: AmiGO / QuickGO
Search
- PMC: articles
- PubMed: articles
- NCBI: proteins

Glucose-1-phosphate cytidylyltransferase (EC 2.7.7.33) is an enzyme that catalyzes the chemical reaction

cytidine triphosphate
+
glucose 1-phosphate
PP_{i}
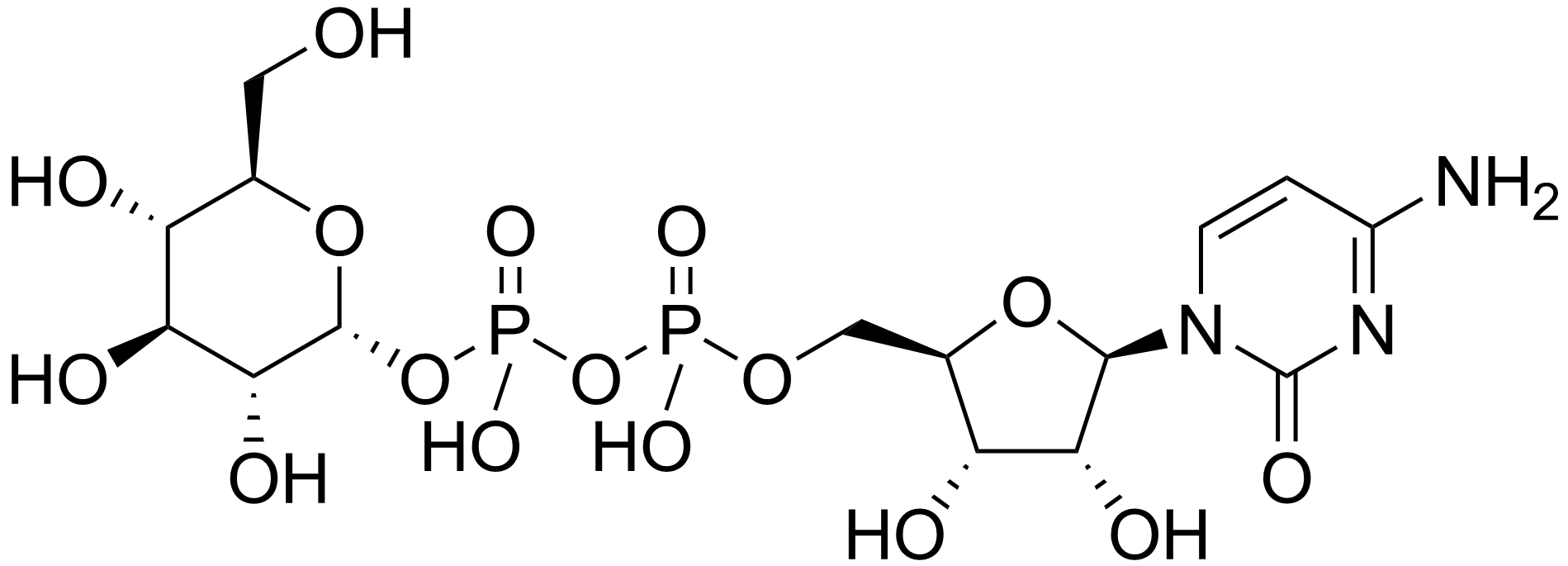
cytidine diphosphate glucose

The enzyme characterised from Salmonella paratyphi combines cytidine triphosphate and glucose 1-phosphate to give cytidine diphosphate glucose, with pyrophosphate (PP_{i}) as a byproduct.

This enzyme is a transferase, specifically one transferring phosphorus-containing nucleotide groups (nucleotidyltransferases). The systematic name of this enzyme class is CTP:alpha-D-glucose-1-phosphate cytidylyltransferase. Other names in common use include CDP glucose pyrophosphorylase, cytidine diphosphoglucose pyrophosphorylase, cytidine diphosphate glucose pyrophosphorylase, cytidine diphosphate-D-glucose pyrophosphorylase, and CTP:D-glucose-1-phosphate cytidylyltransferase.

== Structural studies ==
As of late 2007, two structures have been solved for this class of enzymes, with PDB accession codes PDB: 1TZF and PDB: 1WVC.
