= Glycogenin-1 =

Protein-coding gene in the species Homo sapiens

GYG1

Identifiers
- Aliases: GYG1, GSD15, GYG, glycogenin 1
- External IDs: OMIM: 603942; MGI: 1351614; GeneCards: GYG1
Available structures
PDB	Ortholog search: PDBe RCSB
PDB	List of PDB id codes 3Q4S, 3QVB, 3RMV, 3RMW, 3T7M, 3T7N, 3T7O, 3U2T, 3U2U, 3U2V, 3U2W, 3U2X
Enzyme activity
EC #	BRENDA	ExPASy	KEGG	MetaCyc
2.4.1.186	↗	↗	↗	↗

Gene location (Human)
Chr.	Chromosome 3 (human)
Band	3q24	Start	148,991,408 bp
Band	3q24	End	149,031,775 bp

Gene location (Mouse)
Chr.	Chromosome 3 (mouse)
Band	3 A2|3 6.19 cM	Start	20,176,248 bp
Band	3 A2|3 6.19 cM	End	20,209,481 bp
RNA expression pattern
Bgee	Human / Mouse (ortholog); Top expressed in: biceps brachii; deltoid muscle; glutes; Skeletal muscle tissue of biceps brachii; Skeletal muscle tissue of rectus abdominis; tibialis anterior muscle; oocyte; triceps brachii muscle; body of tongue; vastus lateralis muscle / Top expressed in: endocardial cushion; left lung lobe; atrioventricular valve; primary oocyte; atrium; secondary oocyte; sternocleidomastoid muscle; temporal muscle; ankle; zygote; More reference expression data
BioGPS	n/a
Gene ontology
Molecular function	transferase activity; protein binding; glycogenin glucosyltransferase activity; metal ion binding; glycosyltransferase activity; UDP-alpha-D-glucose:glucosyl-glycogenin alpha-D-glucosyltransferase activity; manganese ion binding; protein homodimerization activity
Cellular component	cytosol; lysosomal lumen; extracellular exosome; membrane; extracellular region; secretory granule lumen; ficolin-1-rich granule lumen
Biological process	glycogen catabolic process; glycogen biosynthetic process; neutrophil degranulation
Sources:Amigo / QuickGO
Orthologs
Databases	NCBI: entry; OMA: entry
Species	Human	Mouse
Entrez	2992	27357
Ensembl	ENSG00000163754	ENSMUSG00000019528
UniProt	P46976	Q9R062
RefSeq (mRNA)	NM_004130; NM_001184720; NM_001184721	NM_013755; NM_001355261
RefSeq (protein)	NP_001171649; NP_001171650; NP_004121	NP_038783; NP_001342190
Location (UCSC)	Chr 3: 148.99 – 149.03 Mb	Chr 3: 20.18 – 20.21 Mb
PubMed search
- Wikidata
View/Edit Human	View/Edit Mouse

Glycogenin-1 is an enzyme that is involved in the biosynthesis of glycogen. It is capable of self-glucosylation, forming an oligosaccharide primer that serves as a substrate for glycogen synthase. This is done through an inter-subunit mechanism. It also plays a role in glycogen metabolism regulation. Recombinant human glycogenin-1 was expressed in E. coli and purified using conventional chromatography techniques.

== Glycogen metabolism ==
Glycogen is a multi-branched polysaccharide. It is primary means of glucose storage in animal cells. In the human body, the two main tissues which store glycogen are liver and skeletal muscle. Glycogen is typically more concentrated in the liver, but because humans have much more muscle mass, our muscles store about three quarters of the total glycogen in our body.

=== Location of glycogen ===
The function of liver glycogen is to maintain glucose homeostasis, generating glucose via glycogenolysis to compensate for the decrease of glucose levels that can occur between meals. Thanks to the presence of the glucose-6-phosphatase enzyme, the hepatocytes are capable of turning glycogen to glucose, releasing it into blood to prevent hypoglycemia.

In skeletal muscle, glycogen is used as an energy source for muscle contraction during exercise. The different functions of glycogen in muscle or liver make the regulation mechanisms of its metabolism differ in each tissue. These mechanisms are based mainly on the differences on structure and on the regulation of the enzymes that catalyze synthesis, glycogen synthase (GS), and degradation, glycogen phosphorylase (GF).

=== Glycogen synthesis ===
Glycogenin is the initiator of the glycogen biosynthesis. This protein is a glycosyl transferase that have the ability of autoglycosilation using UDP-glucose, which helps in the growth of itself until forming an oligosaccharide made by 8 glucoses. Glycogenin is an oligomer, and it's capable of interacting with several proteins. In recent years, a family of proteins has been identified, the GNIPs (glycogenin-interacting protein), that interacts with glycogenin stimulating its autoglycolsilation activity.

=== Glycogenin-1 ===
In humans, two isoforms of glycogenin can be expressed: glycogenin-1, with a molecular weight of 37 kDa and codified by GYG1 gen, which is expressed mostly in muscles; and glycogenin-2, with a molecular weight of 66 kDa and codified by GYG2 gen, which is expressed mainly in liver, cardiac muscle and other types of tissue, but not in skeletal muscle. Glycogenin-1 was described by analyzing the glycogen of skeletal muscle. It was determined that this molecule was united by a covalent bond to each mature molecule of muscular glycogen.

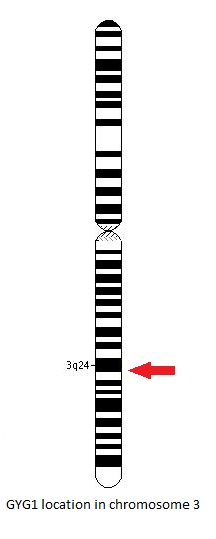
GYG-1 gene location in chromosome 3.

== Gene ==
=== Structure ===
The glycogenin-1 gene, which spans over 13kb, consists of seven exons and six introns. Its proximal promoter contains a TATA box, a cyclic AMP responsive element, and two putative Sp1 binding sites in a CpG island, a DNA region with a high frequency of CpG sites. There are also nine E-boxes that bind the basic helix-loop-helix of muscle-specific transcription factors.

=== Location and transcription ===
The GYG1 gene is located on the long arm of the chromosome 3, between positions 24 and 25, from base pair 148,709,194 to base pair 148,745,455.

Transcription of human glycogenin-1 is mainly initiated at 80bp and 86bp upstream the translator’s codon beginning. Transcriptions factors have different binding sites for its development, some examples are: GATA, activator protein 1 and 2 (AP-1 and AP-2), and numerous potential Octamer-1 binding sites.

== Deficiency ==
A Glycogenin-1 deficiency leads to Glycogen storage disease type XV.

=== Mutation ===
Deficiency of glycogenin-1 is detected in the sequence of the glycogenin-1 gene, GYG1, which revealed a non-sense mutation in one allele and a missense mutation, Thr83Met, in the other. The missense mutation resulted in inactivation of the autoglycosylation of glycogenin-1, which is necessary for the priming of glycogen synthesis in muscle. Autoglycosylation of glycogenin-1 occurs at Tyr195 by a gulose-1-O-tyrosine linkage. An induced missense mutation of this residue results in inactivated autoglycosylation. However, missense mutation affecting some other residues of glycogenin-1 has also been shown to eliminate autoglycosilation.

=== Consequences ===
The phenotypic features of the skeletal muscle in a patient with this disorder are muscle glycogen depletion, mitochondrial proliferation, and a marked predominance of slow-twitch, oxidative muscle fibres. The mutations in the glycogenin-1 gene GYG1 are also a cause of cardiomyopathy and arrhythmia.

== See also ==
- Glucose
- Glycogen
- Glycogen synthase
- Glycogenin
- Gene
- Mutation
