= Cytidine diphosphate glucose =

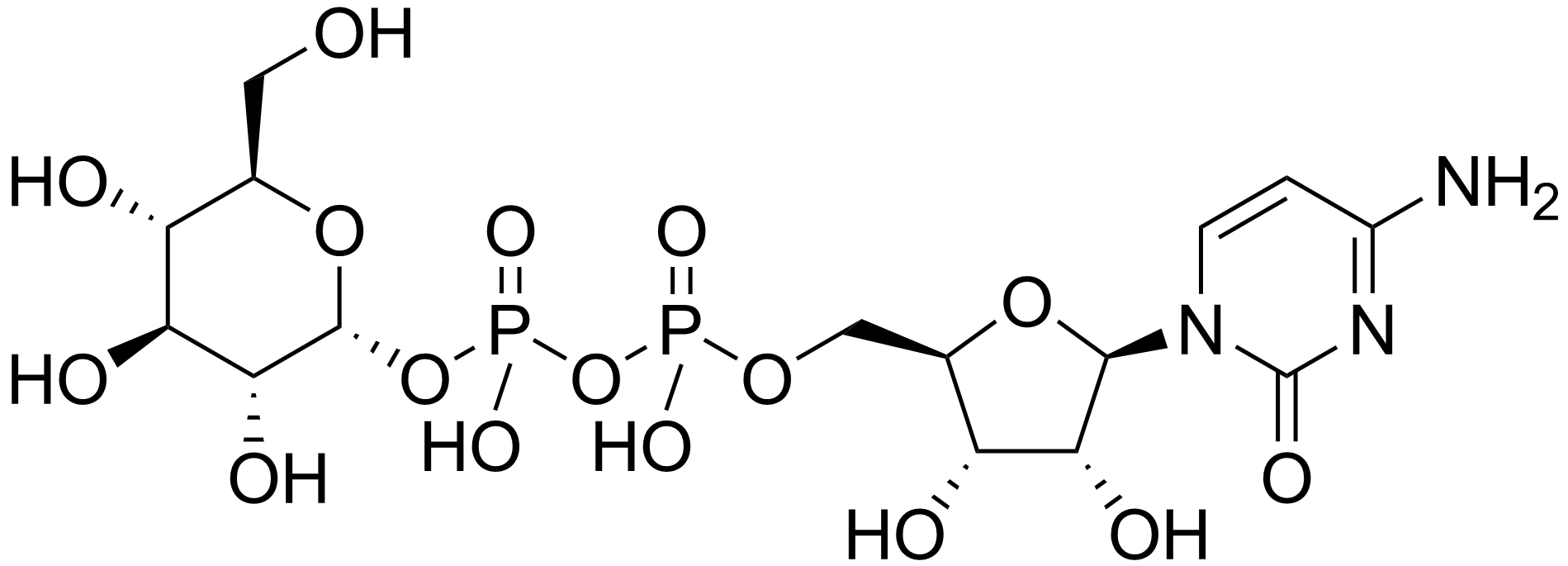

Names
- IUPAC name Cytidine 5′-(α-D-glucopyranosyl trihydrogen diphosphate)
- Systematic IUPAC name O^{1}-{[(2R,3S,4R,5R)-5-(4-Amino-2-oxopyrimidin-1(2H)-yl)-3,4-dihydroxyoxolan-2-yl]methyl} O^{3}-[(2R,3R,4S,5S,6R)-3,4,5-trihydroxy-6-(hydroxymethyl)oxan-2-yl] dihydrogen diphosphate
- Other names CDP-glucose

Identifiers
| CAS Number | 2906-23-2 |
| 3D model (JSmol) | Interactive image; Interactive image |
| ChemSpider | 388381 |
| PubChem CID | 439244 |
| UNII | C3MET5N4NR |
| CompTox Dashboard (EPA) | DTXSID301028840 |
- InChI: InChI=1S/C15H25N3O16P2/c16-7-1-2-18(15(25)17-7)13-11(23)9(21)6(31-13)4-30-35(26,27)34-36(28,29)33-14-12(24)10(22)8(20)5(3-19)32-14/h1-2,5-6,8-14,19-24H,3-4H2,(H,26,27)(H,28,29)(H2,16,17,25)/t5-,6-,8-,9-,10+,11-,12-,13-,14-/m1/s1 Key: CGPHZDRCVSLMCF-JZMIEXBBSA-N
- SMILES: C1=CN(C(=O)N=C1N)[C@H]2[C@@H]([C@@H]([C@H](O2)COP(=O)(O)OP(=O)(O)O[C@@H]3[C@@H]([C@H]([C@@H]([C@H](O3)CO)O)O)O)O)O; O=P(O[C@H]1O[C@@H]([C@@H](O)[C@H](O)[C@H]1O)CO)(O)OP(=O)(O)OC[C@H]3O[C@@H](N2/C=C\C(=N/C2=O)\N)[C@H](O)[C@@H]3O

Properties
| Chemical formula | C_{15}H_{25}N_{3}O_{16}P_{2} |
| Molar mass | 565.318 g·mol^{−1} |
- Except where otherwise noted, data are given for materials in their standard state (at 25 °C [77 °F], 100 kPa). verify (what is ?) Infobox references

Cytidine diphosphate glucose, often abbreviated CDP-glucose, is a nucleotide-linked sugar consisting of cytidine diphosphate and glucose. This nucleotide saccharide participates in the synthesis of deoxy sugars such as paratose and tyvelose.

== Metabolism ==
CDP-glucose is produced from CTP and glucose-1-phosphate by the enzyme glucose-1-phosphate cytidylyltransferase.

CDP-glucose is an important metabolite in certain bacteria, which synthesize O antigens from it. CDP-glucose can also be used as a substrate for glycogenin, along its native substrate, UDP-glucose. The same is true for TDP-glucose.
