= Glycorandomization =

Technology enabling rapid molecule diversification

Glycorandomization, is a drug discovery and drug development technology platform to enable the rapid diversification of bioactive small molecules, drug leads and/or approved drugs through the attachment of sugars. Initially developed as a facile method to manipulate carbohydrate substitutions of naturally occurring glycosides to afford the corresponding differentially glycosylated natural product libraries, glycorandomization applications have expanded to include both small molecules (drug leads and approved drugs) and even macromolecules (proteins). Also referred to as 'glycodiversification', glycorandomization has led to the discovery of new glycoside analogs which display improvements in potency, selectivity and/or ADMET as compared to the parent molecule.

== Classification ==
The traditional method for attaching sugars to natural products, drugs or drug leads is by chemical glycosylation. This classical approach typically requires multiple protection/deprotection steps in addition to the key anomeric activation/coupling reaction which, depending upon the glycosyl donor/acceptor pair, can lead to a mixture of anomers. Unlike classical chemical glycosylation, glycorandomization methods are divergent (i.e., diverge from a common starting material, see divergent synthesis) and are not dependent upon sugar/aglycon protection/deprotection or sugar anomeric activation. Two complementary strategies to achieve glycorandomization/diversification have been developed: an enzyme-based strategy referred to as 'chemoenzymatic glycorandomization' and a chemoselective method known as 'neoglycorandomization'. Both methods start with free reducing sugars and a target aglycon to afford a library of compounds which differ solely by the sugars appended to the target natural product, drug or drug lead.

=== Chemoenzymatic glycorandomization ===

Chemoenzymatic glycorandomization was inspired by the early pathway engineering work of Hutchinson and coworkers that suggested natural product glycosyltransferases were capable of utilizing non-native sugar nucleotide donors. The initial platform for chemoenzymatic glycorandomization was based upon a set of two highly permissive sugar activation enzymes (a sugar anomeric kinase and sugar-1-phosphate nucleotidyltransferase) to afford sugar nucleotide libraries as donors for these promiscuous glycosyltransferases where the permissivity of the corresponding sugar kinase and nucleotidyltransferase was expanded by enzyme engineering and directed evolution. The first application of this three enzyme (kinase, nucleotidyltransferase and glycosyltransferase) strategy enabled the product of a set of >30 differentially glycosylated vancomycins, some members of which were further diversified chemoselectively by virtue of the installation of sugars bearing chemoselective handles. This enzymatic platform has been further advanced through glycosyltransferase evolution and capitalizing upon the discovery of the reversibility of glycosyltransferase-catalyzed reactions first discovered in the context of calicheamicin biosynthesis.

=== Neoglycorandomization ===

Neoglycorandomization is a chemoselective glycodiversification method inspired by the alkoxyamine-based ‘neoglycosylation’ reaction first described Peri and Dumy. This reaction proceeds via an oxy-iminium intermediate to ultimately provide the more thermodynamically-favored closed ring neoglycoside. The neoglycosylation reaction is compatible with a wide range of saccharide and aglycon functionality where neoglycoside anomeric stereospecificity is a thermodynamically-driven. Importantly, structural and functional studies reveal neoglycosides to serve as good mimics of their O-glycosidic comparators. The first neoglycorandomization proof of concept focused upon digitoxin where the rapid generation and cancer cell line cytotoxicity screening of 78 digitoxigenin neoglycosides revealed unique analogs with improved anticancer activity and reduced potential for cardiotoxicity. This platform has since been automated and used as an effective medicinal chemistry tool to modulate the properties of a range of natural products and pharmaceutical drugs.

=== Comparison ===
Both chemoenzymatic glycorandomization and neoglycorandomization use free reducing sugars and unprotected aglycons and are thereby a notable advance over classical glycosylation methods. A notable advantage of the enzymatic approach is the use of the corresponding genes encoding for the permissive kinases, nucleotidyltransferases and/or glycosyltransferases for in vivo synthetic biology applications to afford in vivo glycorandomization. However, the enzymatic platform is dependent upon the permissivity of the enzymes employed. In contrast, the main hurdle to chemoselective neoglycorandomization is installation of the alkoxylamine handle. Unlike the enzymatic approach, the anomeric stereoselectivity of the chemoselective method depends upon the reducing sugar used and can, in some cases, lead to anomeric mixtures.

== Uses ==
Glycorandomization is used in the pharmaceutical industry and academic community to alter glycosylation patterns of sugar-containing natural products or to append sugars to drugs/drug leads. It provides a fast way to investigate the effect of subtle sugar modification on the pharmacological properties of the natural products analogues, thus, affording a new approach to drug discovery.
