= Nucleotide sugars metabolism =

The nucleotide sugar UDP-galactose.

In nucleotide sugar metabolism a group of biochemicals known as nucleotide sugars act as donors for sugar residues in the glycosylation reactions that produce polysaccharides. They are substrates for glycosyltransferases. The nucleotide sugars are also intermediates in nucleotide sugar interconversions that produce some of the activated sugars needed for glycosylation reactions. Since most glycosylation takes place in the endoplasmic reticulum and golgi apparatus, there are a large family of nucleotide sugar transporters that allow nucleotide sugars to move from the cytoplasm, where they are produced, into the organelles where they are consumed.

Nucleotide sugar metabolism is particularly well-studied in yeast, fungal pathogens, and bacterial pathogens, such as E. coli and Mycobacterium tuberculosis, since these molecules are required for the synthesis of glycoconjugates on the surfaces of these organisms. These glycoconjugates are virulence factors and components of the fungal and bacterial cell wall. These pathways are also studied in plants, but here the enzymes involved are less well understood.
