= Uridine diphosphate glucose =

Names
- IUPAC name Uridine 5′-(α-D-glucopyranosyl dihydrogen diphosphate)
- Systematic IUPAC name O^{1}-{[(2R,3S,4R,5R)-5-(2,4-Dioxo-3,4-dihydropyrimidin-1(2H)-yl)-3,4-dihydroxyoxolan-2-yl]methyl} O^{3}-[(2R,3R,4S,5S,6R)-3,4,5-trihydroxy-6-(hydroxymethyl)oxan-2-yl] dihydrogen diphosphate
- Other names UDP-glucose

Identifiers
CAS Number	133-89-1
3D model (JSmol)	Interactive image
ChEBI	CHEBI:52249
ChEMBL	ChEMBL375951
ChemSpider	8308
ECHA InfoCard	100.004.657
IUPHAR/BPS	1783
MeSH	Uridine+Diphosphate+Glucose
PubChem CID	8629
UNII	V50K1D7P4Y
CompTox Dashboard (EPA)	DTXSID00157902
- InChI: InChI=1S/C15H24N2O17P2/c18-3-5-8(20)10(22)12(24)14(32-5)33-36(28,29)34-35(26,27)30-4-6-9(21)11(23)13(31-6)17-2-1-7(19)16-15(17)25/h1-2,5-6,8-14,18,20-24H,3-4H2,(H,26,27)(H,28,29)(H,16,19,25)/t5-,6-,8-,9-,10+,11-,12-,13-,14-/m1/s1 Key: HSCJRCZFDFQWRP-JZMIEXBBSA-N; InChI=1/C15H24N2O17P2/c18-3-5-8(20)10(22)12(24)14(32-5)33-36(28,29)34-35(26,27)30-4-6-9(21)11(23)13(31-6)17-2-1-7(19)16-15(17)25/h1-2,5-6,8-14,18,20-24H,3-4H2,(H,26,27)(H,28,29)(H,16,19,25)/t5-,6-,8-,9-,10+,11-,12-,13-,14-/m1/s1 Key: HSCJRCZFDFQWRP-JZMIEXBBBU
- SMILES: O=P(O[C@H]1O[C@@H]([C@@H](O)[C@H](O)[C@H]1O)CO)(O)OP(=O)(O)OC[C@H]3O[C@@H](N2/C=C\C(=O)NC2=O)[C@H](O)[C@@H]3O

Properties
Chemical formula	C_{15}H_{24}N_{2}O_{17}P_{2}
Molar mass	566.302 g/mol
- Except where otherwise noted, data are given for materials in their standard state (at 25 °C [77 °F], 100 kPa). verify (what is ?) Infobox references

Uridine diphosphate glucose (uracil-diphosphate glucose, UDP-glucose) is a nucleotide sugar. It is involved in glycosyltransferase reactions in metabolism.

== Functions ==
UDP-glucose is used in nucleotide sugar metabolism as an activated form of glucose, a substrate for enzymes called glucosyltransferases.

UDP-glucose is a precursor of glycogen and can be converted into UDP-galactose and UDP-glucuronic acid, which can then be used as substrates by the enzymes that make polysaccharides containing galactose and glucuronic acid.

UDP-glucose can also be used as a precursor of sucrose, lipopolysaccharides and glycosphingolipids.

== Components ==
UDP-glucose consists of the pyrophosphate group, ribose, glucose, and uracil.

== See also ==
- DNA
- Nucleoside
- Nucleotide
- Oligonucleotide
- RNA
- TDP-glucose
- Uracil
- Uridine diphosphate
