= Uridine diphosphate =

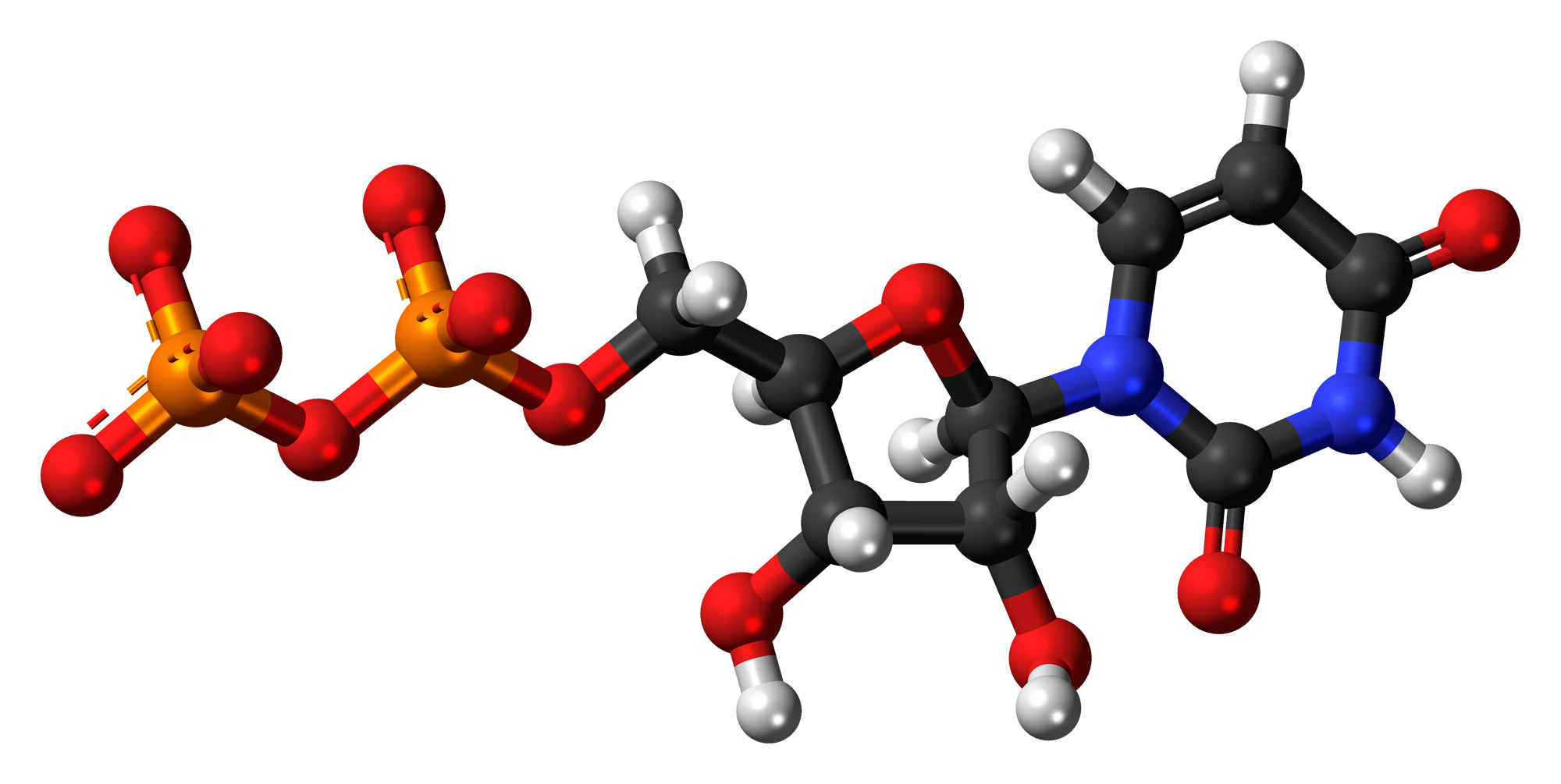

Names
- IUPAC name Uridine 5′-(trihydrogen diphosphate)
- Systematic IUPAC name [(2R,3S,4R,5R)-5-(2,4-Dioxo-3,4-dihydropyrimidin-1(2H)-yl)-3,4-dihydroxyoxolan-2-yl]methyl trihydrogen diphosphate

Identifiers
CAS Number	58-98-0
ChEMBL	ChEMBL130266
ChemSpider	19952429
ECHA InfoCard	100.000.372
IUPHAR/BPS	1749
MeSH	Uridine+diphosphate
PubChem CID	1158
UNII	5G0F599A1Y
CompTox Dashboard (EPA)	DTXSID001018933
- InChI: InChI=1S/C9H12N2O6.2H3O4P/c12-3-4-6(14)7(15)8(17-4)11-2-1-5(13)10-9(11)16;2*1-5(2,3)4/h1-2,4,6-8,12,14-15H,3H2,(H,10,13,16);2*(H3,1,2,3,4)/t4-,6-,7-,8-;;/m1../s1 Key: PMPFLUWUGZHTOK-WFIJOQBCSA-N

Properties
Chemical formula	C_{9}H_{14}N_{2}O_{12}P_{2}
Molar mass	404.161
- Except where otherwise noted, data are given for materials in their standard state (at 25 °C [77 °F], 100 kPa). verify (what is ?) Infobox references

Uridine diphosphate, abbreviated UDP, is an organic compound. It is an ester of pyrophosphoric acid with the nucleoside uridine. UDP consists of the pyrophosphate group, the pentose sugar ribose, and the nucleobase uracil.

UDP is an important factor in glycogenesis. Before glucose can be stored as glycogen in the liver and muscles, the enzyme UDP-glucose pyrophosphorylase forms a UDP-glucose unit by combining glucose 1-phosphate with uridine triphosphate, cleaving a pyrophosphate ion in the process. Then, the enzyme glycogen synthase combines UDP-glucose units to form a glycogen chain. The UDP molecule is cleaved from the glucose ring during this process and can be reused by UDP-glucose pyrophosphorylase.

== See also ==
- DNA
- Nucleoside
- Nucleotide
- Oligonucleotide
- RNA
- UGGT
