= Glycosyltransferase =

Class of enzymes

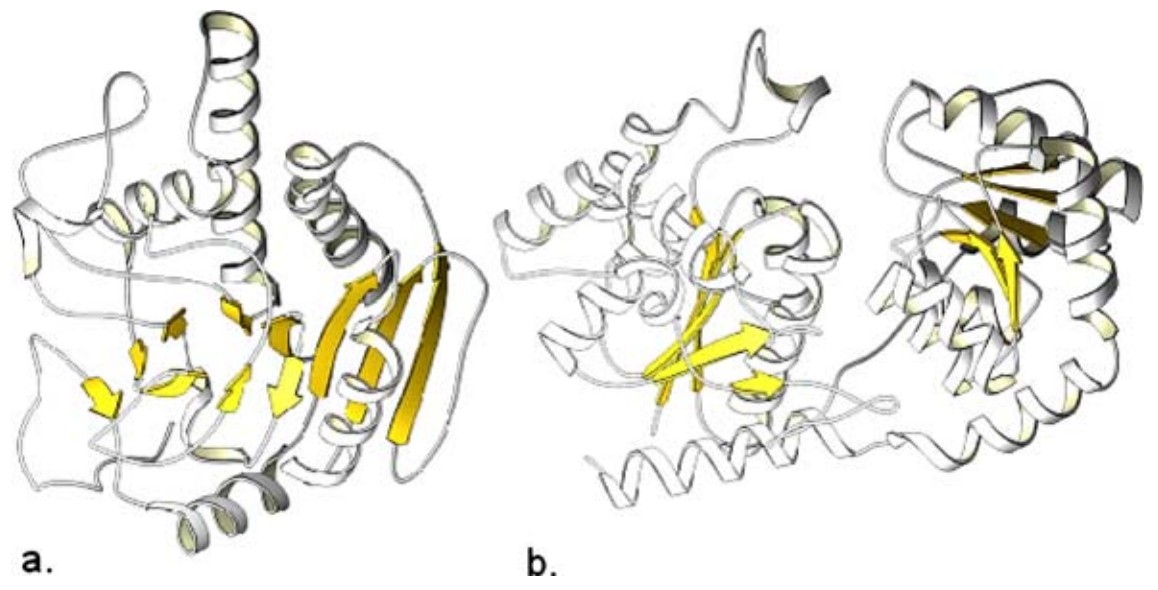
Most glycosyltransferase enzymes form one of two folds: GT-A or GT-B

Glycosyltransferases (GTFs, Gtfs) are enzymes (EC 2.4) that establish natural glycosidic linkages. They catalyze the transfer of saccharide moieties from an activated nucleotide sugar (also known as the "glycosyl donor") to a nucleophilic glycosyl acceptor molecule, the nucleophile of which can be oxygen- carbon-, nitrogen-, or sulfur-based.

The result of glycosyl transfer can be a carbohydrate, glycoside, oligosaccharide, or a polysaccharide. Some glycosyltransferases catalyse transfer to inorganic phosphate or water. Glycosyl transfer can also occur to protein residues, usually to tyrosine, serine, or threonine to give O-linked glycoproteins, or to asparagine to give N-linked glycoproteins. Mannosyl groups may be transferred to tryptophan to generate C-mannosyl tryptophan, which is relatively abundant in eukaryotes. Transferases may also use lipids as an acceptor, forming glycolipids, and even use lipid-linked sugar phosphate donors, such as dolichol phosphates in eukaryotic organism, or undecaprenyl phosphate in bacteria.

Glycosyltransferases that use sugar nucleotide donors are Leloir enzymes, after Luis F. Leloir, the scientist who discovered the first sugar nucleotide and who received the 1970 Nobel Prize in Chemistry for his work on carbohydrate metabolism. Glycosyltransferases that use non-nucleotide donors such as dolichol or polyprenol pyrophosphate are non-Leloir glycosyltransferases.

Mammals use only 9 sugar nucleotide donors for glycosyltransferases: UDP-glucose, UDP-galactose, UDP-GlcNAc, UDP-GalNAc, UDP-xylose, UDP-glucuronic acid, GDP-mannose, GDP-fucose, and CMP-sialic acid. The phosphate(s) of these donor molecules are usually coordinated by divalent cations such as manganese, however metal independent enzymes exist.

Many glycosyltransferases are single-pass transmembrane proteins, and they are usually anchored to membranes of Golgi apparatus

== Mechanism ==
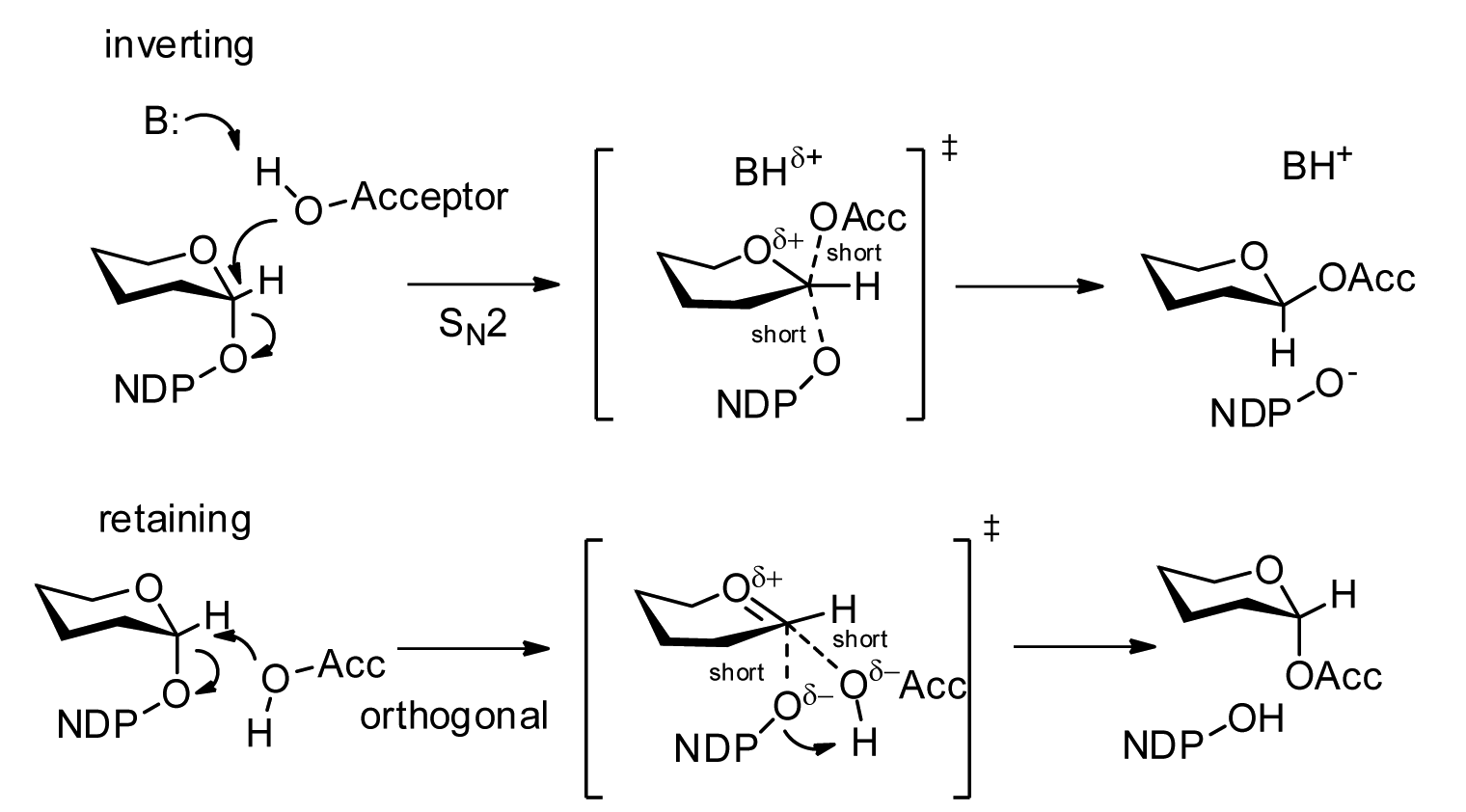

Glycosyltransferases can be segregated into "retaining" or "inverting" enzymes according to whether the stereochemistry of the donor's anomeric bond is retained (α→α) or inverted (α→β) during the transfer. The inverting mechanism is straightforward, requiring a single nucleophilic attack from the accepting atom to invert stereochemistry.

The retaining mechanism has been a matter of debate, but there exists strong evidence against a double displacement mechanism (which would cause two inversions about the anomeric carbon for a net retention of stereochemistry) or a dissociative mechanism (a prevalent variant of which was known as SNi). An "orthogonal associative" mechanism has been proposed which, akin to the inverting enzymes, requires only a single nucleophilic attack from an acceptor from a non-linear angle (as observed in many crystal structures) to achieve anomer retention.

== Reaction reversibility ==
The recent discovery of the reversibility of many reactions catalyzed by inverting glycosyltransferases served as a paradigm shift in the field and raises questions regarding the designation of sugar nucleotides as 'activated' donors.

== Classification by sequence ==
Sequence-based classification methods have proven to be a powerful way of generating hypotheses for protein function based on sequence alignment to related proteins. The carbohydrate-active enzyme database presents a sequence-based classification of glycosyltransferases into over 90 families. The same three-dimensional fold is expected to occur within each of the families.

== Structure ==
In contrast to the diversity of 3D structures observed for glycoside hydrolases, glycosyltransferase have a much smaller range of structures. In fact, according to the Structural Classification of Proteins database, only three different folds have been observed for glycosyltransferases Very recently, a new glycosyltransferase fold was identified for the glycosyltransferases involved in the biosynthesis of the NAG-NAM polymer backbone of peptidoglycan.

== Inhibitors ==
Many inhibitors of glycosyltransferases are known. Some of these are natural products, such as moenomycin, an inhibitor of peptidoglycan glycosyltransferases, the nikkomycins, inhibitors of chitin synthase, and the echinocandins, inhibitors of fungal β-1,3-glucan synthases. Some glycosyltransferase inhibitors are of use as drugs or antibiotics. Moenomycin is used in animal feed as a growth promoter. Caspofungin has been developed from the echinocandins and is in use as an antifungal agent. Ethambutol is an inhibitor of mycobacterial arabinotransferases and is used for the treatment of tuberculosis. Lufenuron is an inhibitor of insect chitin syntheses and is used to control fleas in animals. Imidazolium-based synthetic inhibitors of glycosyltransferases have been designed for use as antimicrobial and antiseptic agents.

== Determinant of blood type ==
Glycosyltransferase family 6

Identifiers
- Symbol: GT6
- Pfam: PF03414
- InterPro: IPR005076
- OPM superfamily: 199
- OPM protein: 2rj6
- Membranome: 468
Available protein structures:
- PDB: IPR005076 PF03414 (ECOD; PDBsum)
- AlphaFold: IPR005076; PF03414

The ABO blood group system is determined by what type of glycosyltransferases are expressed in the body.

The ABO gene locus expressing the glycosyltransferases has three main allelic forms: A, B, and O. The A allele encodes 1-3-N-acetylgalactosaminyltransferase that bonds α-N-acetylgalactosamine to D-galactose end of H antigen, producing the A antigen. The B allele encodes 1-3-galactosyltransferase that joins α-D-galactose bonded to D-galactose end of H antigen, creating the B antigen. In case of O allele the exon 6 contains a deletion that results in a loss of enzymatic activity. The O allele differs slightly from the A allele by deletion of a single nucleotide - Guanine at position 261. The deletion causes a frameshift and results in translation of an almost entirely different protein that lacks enzymatic activity. This results in H antigen remaining unchanged in case of O groups.

The combination of glycosyltransferases by both alleles present in each person determines whether there is an AB, A, B or O blood type.

== Uses ==
Glycosyltransferases have been widely used in both the targeted synthesis of specific glycoconjugates as well as the synthesis of differentially glycosylated libraries of drugs, biological probes or natural products in the context of drug discovery and drug development (a process known as glycorandomization). Suitable enzymes can be isolated from natural sources or produced recombinantly. As an alternative, whole cell-based systems using either endogenous glycosyl donors or cell-based systems containing cloned and expressed systems for synthesis of glycosyl donors have been developed. In cell-free approaches, the large-scale application of glycosyltransferases for glycoconjugate synthesis has required access to large quantities of the glycosyl donors. On the flip-side, nucleotide recycling systems that allow the resynthesis of glycosyl donors from the released nucleotide have been developed. The nucleotide recycling approach has a further benefit of reducing the amount of nucleotide formed as a by-product, thereby reducing the amount of inhibition caused to the glycosyltransferase of interest – a commonly observed feature of the nucleotide byproduct.

== See also ==
- Carbohydrate chemistry
- Chemical glycosylation
- Glucuronosyltransferase
- Glycogen synthase
- Glycosyl acceptor
- Glycosyl donor
- Glycosylation
- Oligosaccharyltransferase
