= CMAH =

Pseudogene in humans

CMAHP

Identifiers
- Aliases: CMAHP, CMAH, CSAH, cytidine monophospho-N-acetylneuraminic acid hydroxylase, pseudogene
- External IDs: MGI: 103227; GeneCards: CMAHP

Gene location (Human)
Chr.	Chromosome 6 (human)
Band	6p22.3	Start	25,061,626 bp
Band	6p22.3	End	25,452,263 bp

Gene location (Mouse)
Chr.	Chromosome 13 (mouse)
Band	13|13 A3.1	Start	24,511,387 bp
Band	13|13 A3.1	End	24,661,360 bp
RNA expression pattern
Bgee	Human / Mouse (ortholog); Top expressed in: right uterine tube; olfactory zone of nasal mucosa; left lobe of thyroid gland; right lobe of thyroid gland; body of uterus; ascending aorta; bronchial epithelial cell; right coronary artery; Achilles tendon; Descending thoracic aorta / Top expressed in: conjunctival fornix; left lobe of liver; mesenteric lymph nodes; blood; spleen; granulocyte; proximal tubule; right kidney; thymus; carotid body; More reference expression data
BioGPS	n/a
Gene ontology
Molecular function	CMP-N-acetylneuraminate monooxygenase activity
Cellular component	cytoplasm; cytoskeleton; membrane; nucleus
Biological process	regulation of Wnt signaling pathway
Sources:Amigo / QuickGO
Orthologs
Databases	NCBI: entry; OMA: entry
Species	Human	Mouse
Entrez	8418	12763
Ensembl	ENSG00000168405	ENSMUSG00000016756
UniProt	Q9Y471	Q61419
RefSeq (mRNA)	NM_003570	NM_001111110; NM_001284519; NM_001284520; NM_007717
RefSeq (protein)	n/a	NP_001104580; NP_001271448; NP_001271449; NP_031743
Location (UCSC)	Chr 6: 25.06 – 25.45 Mb	Chr 13: 24.51 – 24.66 Mb
PubMed search
- Wikidata
View/Edit Human	View/Edit Mouse

Cytidine monophospho-N-acetylneuraminic acid hydroxylase (Cmah) is an enzyme that is encoded by the CMAH gene. In most mammals, the enzyme hydroxylates N-acetylneuraminic acid (Neu5Ac), producing N-glycolylneuraminic acid (Neu5Gc). Neu5Ac and Neu5Gc are mammalian glycans that compose the glycocalyx, especially in sialoglycoproteins, which are part of the sialic acid family. The CMAH equivalent in humans is a pseudogene (CMAHP); there is no detectable Neu5Gc in normal human tissue. This deficiency has a number of proposed effects on humans, including increased brain growth, improved self-recognition by the human immune system, and susceptibility to atherosclerosis. Incorporation of Neu5Gc from red meat and dairy into human tissues has been linked to chronic disease, including type-2 diabetes and chronic inflammation.

== Discovery ==
The biosynthesis pathway of Neu5Gc from Neu5Ac was discovered by Shaw and Schauer in 1988, while the protein and DNA sequences for Neu5Gc, Neu5Ac, and CMAHP were described by Irie et al. in 1998.

== Function in other mammals ==
Sialic acids such as Neu5Ac and Neu5Gc are terminal components of the carbohydrate chains of glycoconjugates involved in ligand–receptor, cell–cell, and cell–pathogen interactions. Neu5Gc has been shown to be involved in a variety of processes in mice, including protein metabolism, signal transduction, metabolism of most organic molecules, and immunity.

=== Cat AB blood group ===
The blood type for a cat is mostly covered by the AB blood group system, determined by the CMAH alleles a cat possess. The majority A type seems to be dominant over the recessive B type, which is only found with a higher frequency in some breeds. An "AB" type seems to be expressed by a third recessive allele.

== Function in humans ==
Neu5Gc has been found in normal human tissue, with larger amounts found in fetal and cancerous tissues. Studies suggest that Neu5Gc could be an excellent cancer cell marker. Since Neu5Gc can only be made by functional CMAH, which is not present in humans, researchers have searched for alternative sources of Neu5Gc in humans. Current research indicates that Neu5Gc is incorporated into human tissues through consumption of red meats and dairy. This incorporation process involves macropinocytosis, delivery to the lysosome, and export of free Neu5Gc to the cytosol via the sialin transporter.

Because Neu5Gc differs from Neu5Ac by only one oxygen, it is handled like a native sialic acid by human biochemical pathways. The immune system does not work the same way, however; all humans have varying amounts of a diverse spectrum of anti-Neu5Gc antibodies. If Neu5Gc is constantly being incorporated into tissues due to a diet heavy in red meats and dairy, anti-Neu5Gc antibodies cause chronic inflammation, especially in blood vessels and the linings of hollow organs. These sites are also common places for atherosclerosis and epithelial carcinomas, both of which are associated with red meat and dairy consumption and are aggravated by chronic inflammation. Red meat ingestion and chronic inflammation have also been associated with diseases like type-2 diabetes and age-dependent macular degeneration, so Neu5Gc may be linked to the development of these disorders as well.

Recent data suggests that the hypoxic conditions in carcinomas can up-regulate the expression of the lysosomal sialic acid transporter necessary for Neu5Gc incorporation into human tissues. In addition, growth factors may activate enhanced macropinocytosis, which can increase Neu5Gc incorporation. Studies have shown that fetal tissues are also capable of taking up Neu5Gc from maternal dietary sources, which may explain elevated levels of Neu5Gc in the human fetus.

The presence of Neu5Gc in various biotherapeutics derived from animal products may impact human health and is still being studied. Some complications could include immune hypersensitivity reactions, reduced half-life of the biotherapeutic in circulation, immune complex formation, increase of Neu5Gc antibody concentration, enhanced immunoreactivity against the biotherapeutic polypeptide, and directly loading more Neu5Gc into tissues.

=== Animal model ===
Cmah-knockout mice were developed at the University of California, San Diego by the glycobiologist Ajit Varki and colleagues, and mirror many human-like trait alterations when compared to wildtype mice in running endurance and cardiovascular vulnerabilities, and in inflammatory reaction to the consumption of red meat, which contains Neu5Gc. Knockout mice do not automatically generate anti-Neu5Gc antibodies, however; this is thought to be due to a lack of stimulation from bacteria that have taken Neu5Gc into their lipopolysaccharide shell, which naturally happens in humans. Manual immunization with Neu5Gc-laden red blood cells is required to generate these kind of antibodies.

== Evolution ==
Genomic analyses indicate that CMAH genes are present only in deuterostomes, some unicellular algae and some bacteria. CMAH relatives have been lost in many other deuterostome lineages, including tunicates, many groups of fish, the axolotl, most reptiles, and all birds. Among mammals, the gene is missing or nonfunctional in New World monkeys, the European hedgehog, ferrets, some bats, the sperm whale, and the platypus. These animals lacking a functional CMAH gene do not express Neu5Gc.

=== Human evolution ===
The absence of Neu5Gc in humans is due to a 92-bp AluY-mediated deletion of an exon of the human gene CMAH. Sequences encoding mouse, pig, and chimpanzee CMAH have been examined using cDNA cloning techniques and were found to be highly similar. However, the homologous human cDNA differs from these cDNAs by a 92-bp deletion in the 5' region. This deletion, corresponding to exon 5 of the mouse hydroxylase gene, causes a frameshift mutation and premature termination of the polypeptide chain in humans. Neu5Gc seems to be undetectable in human tissues because the truncated version of human hydroxylase mRNA cannot encode for an active enzyme.

The deletion that deactivated this gene occurred approximately 3.2 mya, after the divergence of humans from the African great apes, and quickly swept to fixation in the human population. The lineage of this pseudogene in humans indicates another deep split in Africa dating to 2.9 mya, with a complex subsequent history.

Sexual selection may have contributed to the fixation of nonfunctional CMAH in humans. This hypothesis has been tested in mice, with females carrying nonfunctional CMAH exhibiting reproductive incompatibility with males carrying functional CMAH due to anti-Neu5Gc antibodies migrating to the female reproductive tract and destroying Neu5Gc-positive sperm.

==== Implications for human evolution ====
Pseudogenes such as CMAH can be used to study allele fixation and demographic history. Analyses of CMAH haplotype diversity have been used to examine human demographic history during the Plio-Pleistocene.

The functional loss of CMAH after the divergence of humans from the great apes has several implications for its role in human development, including less constrained brain growth and increased running endurance, two traits thought to be important to human evolution. In most mammals, CMAH expression is down-regulated in the brain, and experimental up-regulation of CMAH is lethal in mice. Experimental CMAH loss in mice increases running endurance and decreases muscle fatigue, which could have been beneficial to ancestral Homo during the gene's fixation.

==== Implications for pathogenicity ====
The loss of Neu5Gc in humans may have contributed to resistance to generalist pathogens and increased pathogenicity of human-specific pathogens. Human-specific cholera, which employs host sialic acids to trigger a gastrointestinal response, preferentially uses Neu5Ac and is inhibited by Neu5Gc. Many pathogen binding mechanisms rely on sialic acids (and thus Neu5Gc) present at the terminal end of membrane-bound vertebrate glycans and glycoproteins. Among these are the "H" (hemagglutanin) in influenza strains, the glycosylated spike protein σ1 in Reoviridae, the penton capsomere in Adenovirus, and others.

Nonfunctionialization of CMAH has made humans more susceptible to some viruses by decreasing sialic acid diversity. Viruses that bind to Neu5Ac before entering the cell are enhanced by the high density of Neu5Ac, which would be reduced if other sialic acids were present on human cell membranes. For example, the most serious form of malaria in humans, P. falciparum, binds to Neu5Ac on the membrane of red blood cells.

In contrast to these negative effects, losing CMAH should actually protect humans against any pathogen that targets Neu5Gc, such as those that cause diarrheal diseases in livestock, E. coli K99, transmissible gastroenteritis coronavirus (TGEV), and simian virus 40 (SV40).
