= ST6GALNAC1 =

Protein-coding gene in the species Homo sapiens

Identifiers
- Aliases: ST6GALNAC1, HSY11339, SIAT7A, ST6GalNAcI, STYI, ST6 N-acetylgalactosaminide alpha-2,6-sialyltransferase 1
- External IDs: OMIM: 610138; MGI: 1341826; GeneCards: ST6GALNAC1
Enzyme activity
EC #	BRENDA	ExPASy	KEGG	MetaCyc
2.4.3.3	↗	↗	↗	↗

Gene location (Human)
Chr.	Chromosome 17 (human)
Band	17q25.1	Start	76,624,761 bp
Band	17q25.1	End	76,643,786 bp

Gene location (Mouse)
Chr.	Chromosome 11 (mouse)
Band	11|11 E2	Start	116,655,851 bp
Band	11|11 E2	End	116,666,333 bp
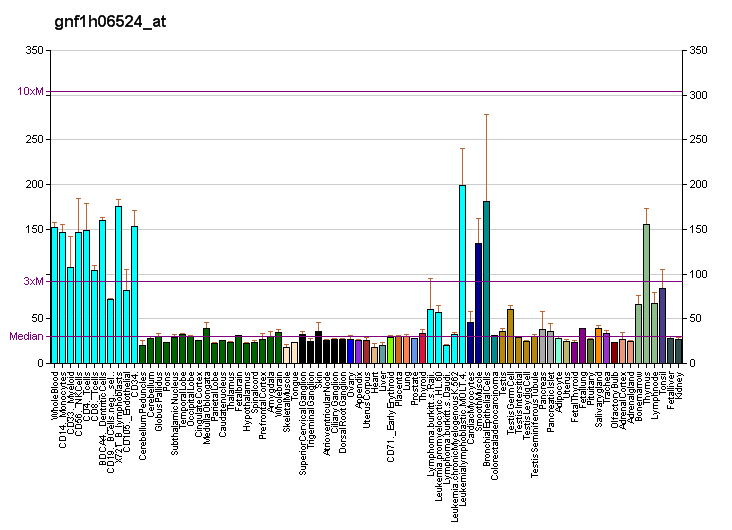
RNA expression pattern
Bgee	Human / Mouse (ortholog); Top expressed in: mucosa of sigmoid colon; mucosa of ileum; rectum; nasal epithelium; bronchial epithelial cell; mucosa of transverse colon; olfactory zone of nasal mucosa; jejunal mucosa; trachea; duodenum / Top expressed in: conjunctival fornix; corneal stroma; lacrimal gland; submandibular gland; parotid gland; Paneth cell; muscle of thigh; small intestine; ileum; central gray substance of midbrain; More reference expression data
BioGPS	More reference expression data
Gene ontology
Molecular function	transferase activity; sialyltransferase activity; glycosyltransferase activity; alpha-N-acetylgalactosaminide alpha-2,6-sialyltransferase activity
Cellular component	integral component of membrane; Golgi apparatus; membrane; Golgi membrane
Biological process	sialylation; protein glycosylation; oligosaccharide biosynthetic process; oligosaccharide metabolic process; protein N-linked glycosylation via asparagine; ganglioside biosynthetic process
Sources:Amigo / QuickGO
Orthologs
Databases	NCBI: entry; OMA: entry
Species	Human	Mouse
Entrez	55808	20445
Ensembl	ENSG00000070526	ENSMUSG00000009588
UniProt	Q9NSC7	Q9QZ39
RefSeq (mRNA)	NM_001289107; NM_018414	NM_011371
RefSeq (protein)	NP_001276036; NP_060884	NP_035501
Location (UCSC)	Chr 17: 76.62 – 76.64 Mb	Chr 11: 116.66 – 116.67 Mb
PubMed search
- Wikidata
View/Edit Human	View/Edit Mouse

Alpha-N-acetylgalactosaminide alpha-2,6-sialyltransferase 1 is an enzyme that in humans is encoded by the ST6GALNAC1 gene. This enzyme adds a N-acetylneuraminic acid (Neu5Ac, a sialic acid) to an O-linked N-acetylgalactosamine (GalNAc) on a peptide/proteins (also called Tn antigen) with an α2-6 linkage to produce the sialyl-Tn antigen. It has been shown that the enzyme prefers threonine over serine containing GalNAc residues.

== See also ==
- Alpha-N-acetylgalactosaminide alpha-2,6-sialyltransferase
