= Salla disease =

- Other names: Sialic acid storage disease or Finnish type sialuria
- Sialic acid
- Specialty: Neurology, endocrinology
- Symptoms: hypotonia; failure to thrive; developmental delays; cognitive deficits; seizures; skeletal abnormalities; dysplasia; metaphyses; clubbed feet; abnormally short thigh bones; dysplasia; nystagmus; ataxia.
- Usual onset: Affected infants appear normal at birth but may develop symptoms during the first year of life.
- Duration: Lifelong
- Causes: mutations in the SLC17A5 gene
- Diagnostic method: clinical evaluation and genetic testing
- Prognosis: variable
- Frequency: <1 per 1,000,000 individuals

Salla disease (SD) or mild Free Sialic Acid Storage Disease (FSASD) is an autosomal recessive lysosomal storage disease characterized by early physical impairment and intellectual disability. Salla disease (also referred to as Finnish-type sialuria, OMIM#604369) was first reported as a lysosomal storage disorder in a family from northern Finland. Salla refers to the area where the affected family resided. It was first described in 1979, after Salla, a municipality in Finnish Lapland and is one of 40 Finnish heritage diseases. The term Salla disease is now used in the literature not only for FSASD cases with the Finnish founder variant in SLC17A5, but also for any mild FSASD cases, independent of the mutation or region of origin.

FSASD (Salla and Infantile Free Sialic Acid Storage Disease) affects males and females in equal numbers. The worldwide prevalence of FSASD is estimated at less than 1 per 1,000,000 individuals. Higher estimated prevalence rates occur in the Salla region of Finland and other Scandinavian countries.

== Signs and symptoms ==
Affected infants appear normal at birth but may develop symptoms during the first year of life. Individuals with Salla disease may present with nystagmus as well as hypotonia, and may have difficulty coordinating voluntary movements (ataxia), reduced muscle tone and strength, and cognitive impairment. The most severely impaired children do not walk or acquire language, but the typical patient learns to walk and speak and has normal life expectancy. The MRI shows arrested or delayed myelination.

Approximately two-thirds of children with mild FSASD eventually learn to walk. Some degree of speech impairment is usually present. Affected infants may learn single words or small sentences, but this ability may be lost as they age. The ability to produce speech is affected more severely than the ability to understand speech. Affected children exhibit some degree of cognitive impairment as well.

FSASD (Salla and Infantile Free Sialic Acid Storage Disease) affects males and females in equal numbers. The worldwide prevalence of FSASD is estimated at less than 1 per 1,000,000 individuals. Higher estimated prevalence rates occur in the Salla region of Finland and other Scandinavian countries.

Approximately ~300 individuals with FSASD have been reported in the literature, of which the majority (> 160 cases) are of Finnish or Swedish ancestry. Individuals with FSASD may be misdiagnosed or undiagnosed, making it difficult to determine the true frequency of the disease in the general population.

== Genetics ==
Salla disease has an autosomal recessive pattern of inheritance.

SD is caused by a mutation in the SLC17A5 gene, located at human chromosome 6q14-15. This gene codes for sialin, a lysosomal membrane protein that transports the charged sugar, N-acetylneuraminic acid (sialic acid), out of lysosomes. The mutation causes sialic acid to build up in the cells.

The disease is inherited in an autosomal recessive manner. This means the defective gene responsible for the disorder is located on an autosome (chromosome 6 is an autosome), and two copies of the defective gene (one inherited from each parent) are required to be born with the disorder. The parents of an individual with an autosomal recessive disorder both carry one copy of the defective gene, but usually do not experience any signs or symptoms of the disorder.

== Diagnosis ==
A diagnosis of this disorder can be made by measuring urine to look for elevated levels of free sialic acid. Prenatal testing is also available for known carriers of this disorder. The diagnosis is ultimately confirmed by identifying genetic mutation(s) in the SLC17A5 gene by molecular genetic testing. This testing is available on a clinical basis.

== Treatment ==
There is no cure for Salla disease. Treatment is limited to controlling the symptoms of this disorder. Anti-convulsant medication may control seizure episodes. Physical therapists can assist an affected individual in building muscle strength and coordination.

Genetic counseling is recommended for affected individuals and their families.

All studies receiving U.S. Government funding, and some supported by private industry, are posted on this government website.

== Prognosis ==
Some individuals with mild FSASD may not develop symptoms until later in childhood when a variety of neurological findings become apparent. These include seizures, involuntary muscle spasms that result in slow, stiff movements of the legs (spasticity), and repetitive, involuntary, writhing movements of the arms and legs (athetosis). Some individuals who previously developed the ability to walk or talk may lose these skills (regression). Some individuals may experience a gradual coarsening of facial features.

== See also ==
- Infantile free sialic acid storage disease (ISSD)
