= Sialate O-acetyltransferase =

Sialate O-acetyltransferase may refer to:

- N-acetylneuraminate 4-O-acetyltransferase, an enzyme
- N-acetylneuraminate 7-O(or 9-O)-acetyltransferase, an enzyme
