= C8H15NO6 =

The molecular formula C_{8}H_{15}NO_{6} (molar mass: 221.21 g/mol, exact mass: 221.089937) may refer to:

- N-Acetylgalactosamine
- N-Acetylglucosamine
- N-Acetylmannosamine
