= N-acylmannosamine kinase =

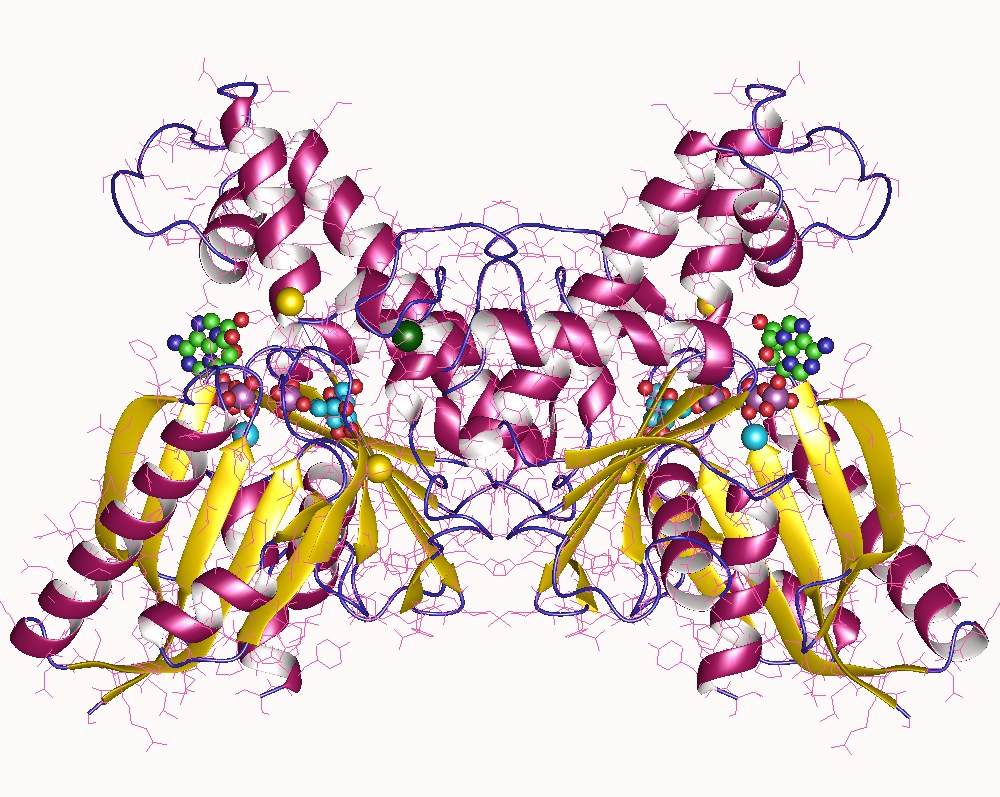
- N-acetylmannosamine kinase dimer, Human

Identifiers
- EC no.: 2.7.1.60
- CAS no.: 9027-53-6

Databases
- IntEnz: IntEnz view
- BRENDA: BRENDA entry
- ExPASy: NiceZyme view
- KEGG: KEGG entry
- MetaCyc: metabolic pathway
- PRIAM: profile
- PDB structures: RCSB PDB PDBe PDBsum
- Gene Ontology: AmiGO / QuickGO
Search
- PMC: articles
- PubMed: articles
- NCBI: proteins

N-acylmannosamine kinase (EC 2.7.1.60) is an enzyme that catalyzes the chemical reaction

ATP +
N-acetylmannosamine
ADP +
N-acetyl-D-mannosamine 6-phosphate

The enzyme characterised from rat liver and Salmonella typhimurium converts N-acetylmannosamine to N-acetyl-D-mannosamine 6-phosphate by transferring a phosphate group from the cofactor, adenosine triphosphate (ATP), which is converted to adenosine diphosphate (ADP). The enzyme also accepts N-acyl derivatives other than N-acetyl, which are part of biochemical pathways to sialic acids.

This enzyme is a transferase, specifically one transferring phosphorus-containing groups (phosphotransferases) with an alcohol group as acceptor. The systematic name of this enzyme class is ATP:N-acyl-D-mannosamine 6-phosphotransferase. Other names in common use include acylmannosamine kinase (phosphorylating), acetylamidodeoxymannokinase, acetylmannosamine kinase, acylaminodeoxymannokinase, acylmannosamine kinase, N-acyl-D-mannosamine kinase, N-acetylmannosamine kinase, and ATP:N-acetylmannosamine 6-phosphotransferase.

== Structural studies ==
As of late 2007, only one structure has been solved for this class of enzymes, with the PDB accession code PDB: 2AA4.
