= N-acetylneuraminate synthase =

Class of enzymes

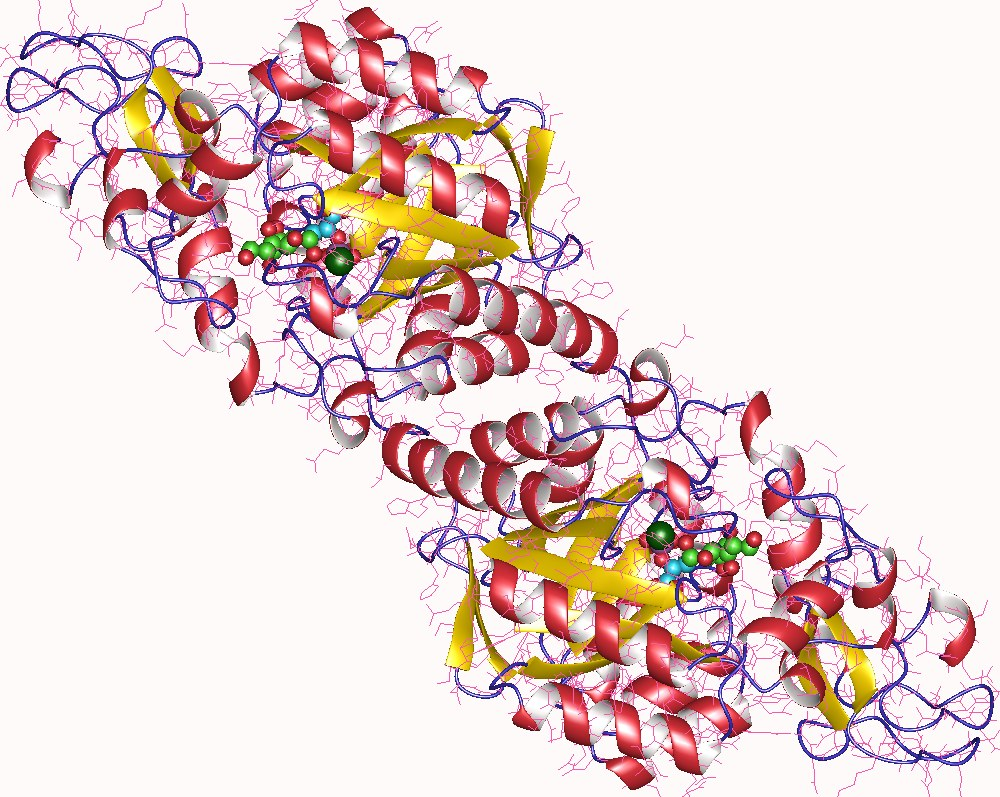
- N-acetylneuraminic acid synthase dimer, Neisseria meningitidis

Identifiers
- EC no.: 2.5.1.56
- CAS no.: 37290-66-7

Databases
- IntEnz: IntEnz view
- BRENDA: BRENDA entry
- ExPASy: NiceZyme view
- KEGG: KEGG entry
- MetaCyc: metabolic pathway
- PRIAM: profile
- PDB structures: RCSB PDB PDBe PDBsum
- Gene Ontology: AmiGO / QuickGO
Search
- PMC: articles
- PubMed: articles
- NCBI: proteins

N-acetylneuraminate synthase (EC 2.5.1.56) is an enzyme that catalyzes the chemical reaction

phosphoenolpyruvic acid
+
N-acetyl-D-mannosamine
H_{2}O
P_{i}
N-Acetylneuraminic acid

The three substrates of this enzyme are phosphoenolpyruvic acid, N-acetyl-D-mannosamine, and water. Its products are the sialic acid, N-Acetylneuraminic acid and orthophosphate (P_{i}). The enzyme has been characterised from Neisseria meningitidis and Escherichia coli.

This enzyme is a transferase, specifically those transferring aryl or alkyl groups other than methyl groups. The systematic name of this enzyme class is phosphoenolpyruvate:N-acetyl-D-mannosamine C-(1-carboxyvinyl)transferase (phosphate-hydrolysing, 2-carboxy-2-oxoethyl-forming). Other names in common use include (NANA)condensing enzyme, N-acetylneuraminate pyruvate-lyase (pyruvate-phosphorylating), and NeuAc synthase.

== Structural studies ==
As of late 2007, only one structure has been solved for this class of enzymes, with the PDB accession code 1WVO.
