= Asialoglycoprotein =

Class of glycoproteins

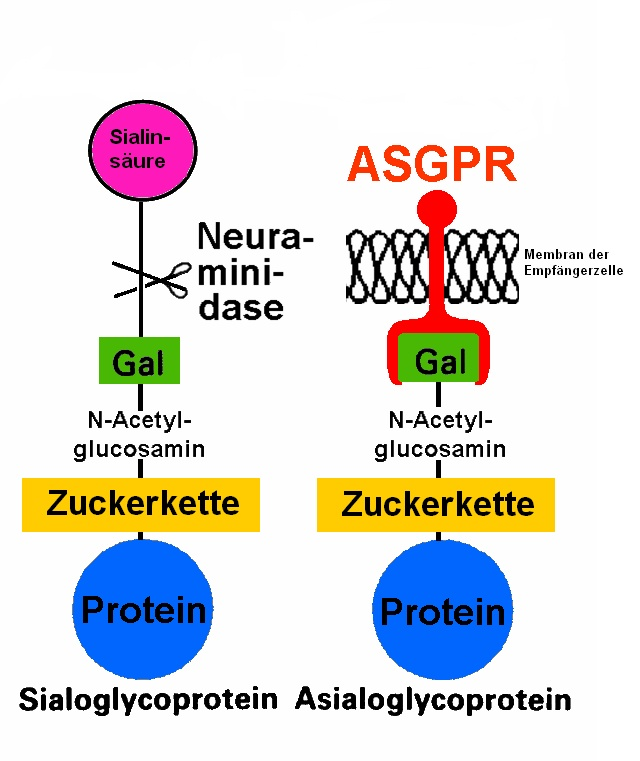
Asialoglycoprotein receptor

If terminal sialic acid residues are removed from glycoproteins, the resulting proteins are known as asialoglycoproteins.

In rats, the exposure of subterminal galactose or GalNAc residues may assist in receptor-mediated endocytosis of asialoglycoproteins by asialoglycoprotein receptors on Kuppfer cells. The human ortholog of this gene is non-functional, but hepatocyte asialoglycoprotein receptors are functional in both humans and rats.
