= N-Glycolylneuraminic acid =

Names
- IUPAC name 3,5-Dideoxy-5-(glycoloylamino)-d-glycero-β-d-galacto-non-2-ulopyranosonic acid
- Other names GcNeu; NGNA; NeuNGl; Neu5Gc

Identifiers
CAS Number	1113-83-3
3D model (JSmol)	Interactive image
ChEBI	CHEBI:62084
ChemSpider	110352
PubChem CID	123802
UNII	NB446XTC7L
- InChI: InChI=1S/C11H19NO10/c13-2-5(16)8(18)9-7(12-6(17)3-14)4(15)1-11(21,22-9)10(19)20/h4-5,7-9,13-16,18,21H,1-3H2,(H,12,17)(H,19,20)/t4-,5+,7+,8+,9+,11-/m0/s1 Key: FDJKUWYYUZCUJX-AJKRCSPLSA-N; InChI=1/C11H19NO10/c13-2-5(16)8(18)9-7(12-6(17)3-14)4(15)1-11(21,22-9)10(19)20/h4-5,7-9,13-16,18,21H,1-3H2,(H,12,17)(H,19,20)/t4-,5+,7+,8+,9+,11-/m0/s1 Key: FDJKUWYYUZCUJX-AJKRCSPLBU
- SMILES: C1[C@@H]([C@H]([C@@H](O[C@@]1(C(=O)O)O)[C@@H]([C@@H](CO)O)O)NC(=O)CO)O

Properties
Chemical formula	C_{11}H_{19}NO_{10}
Molar mass	325.27 g/mol
- Except where otherwise noted, data are given for materials in their standard state (at 25 °C [77 °F], 100 kPa). verify (what is ?) Infobox references

N-Glycolylneuraminic acid (Neu5Gc) is a sialic acid molecule found in most non-human mammals. Humans cannot synthesize Neu5Gc because the human gene CMAH is irreversibly mutated, though it is found in other apes. The gene CMAH encodes CMP-N-acetylneuraminic acid hydroxylase, which is the enzyme responsible for CMP-Neu5Gc from CMP-N-acetylneuraminic (CMP-Neu5Ac) acid. This loss of CMAH is estimated to have occurred two to three million years ago, just before the emergence of the genus Homo.

Neu5Gc is closely related to the commonly known N-acetylneuraminic acid (Neu5Ac). Neu5Ac differs by a single oxygen atom that is added by the CMAH enzyme in the cytosol of a cell. In many mammals, both of these molecules are transferred into the Golgi apparatus so that they may be added to many glycoconjugates. However, in humans, Neu5Gc is not present.

== Elimination of the Neu5Gc gene in humans ==
With the loss of the Neu5Gc gene and the gain of excess Neu5Ac, interactions between pathogens and human ancestors would have been affected. There would have been less susceptibility to Neu5Gc-binding pathogens, and more susceptibility to Neu5Ac-binding pathogens. It is suggested that human ancestors lacking Neu5Gc production survived a then-prevailing malaria epidemic. However, with the rise of Plasmodium falciparum, the parasite that causes malaria today, humans were once again endangered, as this new strain of malaria had a binding preference to the Neu5Ac-rich erythrocytes in humans. The latest research shows that humans who lack Neu5Ac on their red blood cells are less likely to get malaria from the parasites that cause it.

== Occurrence ==
Neu5Gc is found in most mammals, with exceptions like humans, ferrets, the platypus, western dog breeds and New World monkeys. Trace amounts can be found in humans, even though the gene to encode for production of Neu5Gc was eliminated long ago. These trace amounts come from consumption of animals in human diet. Mainly, the sources are red meats such as lamb, pork, and beef. It can also be found in dairy products, but to a lesser extent. Neu5Gc cannot be found in poultry and is found in only trace amounts in fish. This confirms that Neu5Gc is mainly found in foods of mammalian origin. Lanolin in shampoo also contains Neu5Gc.

In 2017, scientists succeeded in indirectly identifying the presence of Neu5Gc from multiple ancient animal fossils dated to over a million years ago, the oldest of which was dated to around 4 Mya.

== Effects on humans ==
Even though Neu5Gc is not known to be produced by any mechanism in the human body (due to lack of genes), our bodies do interact with trillions of microorganisms that are capable of complex biological reactions. Neu5Gc is reported to be found in concentration in human cancers, as well as in fecal samples, suggesting that humans ingest Neu5Gc as part of their diets. Uptake is thought to be by macropinocytosis, and the sialic acid can be transferred to the cytosol by a sialin transporter. Humans have Neu5Gc-specific antibodies, often at high levels.

=== Dietary absorption and excretion ===
Ingested Neu5Gc is incorporated into all body parts, some of which – mucins, hair, saliva, serum and blood – are commonly excreted. Neu5Gc is rapidly absorbed in the intestinal tract, with some of it converted to acylmannosamines by intestinal cells and bacteria, and then reconverted back to Neu5Gc in the body. According to an absorption study, about 3–6% of the ingested dose of Neu5Gc was excreted within 4–6 hours, with the peak excretion rate at 2–3 h, and a return to baseline levels within 24 h. In mucins, an increase was seen from days 1 to 4, with an increase also found in hair after ingestion. This table and this table (S3) show levels of Neu5Gc in common foods.

=== Cancer ===
Neu5Gc has been suggested as a mechanism linking processed meat and red meat consumption with colorectal cancer risk.

== Mechanism of uptake ==
Sialic acids are negatively charged and hydrophilic, so they don't readily cross the hydrophobic regions of cellular membranes. It is because of this that the uptake of Neu5Gc must occur through an endocytic pathway. More specifically, exogenous Neu5Gc molecules enter cells through clathrin-independent endocytic pathways with help from pinocytosis. After the Neu5Gc has entered the cell via pinocytosis, the molecule is released by lysosomal sialidase. The molecule is then transferred into the cytosol by the lysosomal sialic acid transporter. From here, Neu5Gc are available for activation and addition to glycoconjugates. Because Neu5Gc appears to be enhanced in naturally occurring tumors and fetal tumors, it is suggested that this uptake mechanism is enhanced by growth factors.

== See also ==
- N-Acetylneuraminic acid
- Neuraminic acid
- Sialic acid
