= C6H13NO5 =

The molecular formula C_{6}H_{13}NO_{5} (molar mass: 179.17 g/mol, exact mass: 179.0794 u) may refer to:

- Galactosamine
- Glucosamine
- Mannosamine
- Nojirimycin
- Tricine
