= N-acetylglucosaminyldiphosphodolichol N-acetylglucosaminyltransferase =

Class of enzymes

Identifiers
- EC no.: 2.4.1.141
- CAS no.: 75536-54-8

Databases
- IntEnz: IntEnz view
- BRENDA: BRENDA entry
- ExPASy: NiceZyme view
- KEGG: KEGG entry
- MetaCyc: metabolic pathway
- PRIAM: profile
- PDB structures: RCSB PDB PDBe PDBsum
Search
- PMC: articles
- PubMed: articles
- NCBI: proteins

N-acetylglucosaminyldiphosphodolichol N-acetylglucosaminyltransferase (EC 2.4.1.141, UDP-GlcNAc:dolichyl-pyrophosphoryl-GlcNAc GlcNAc transferase, uridine diphosphoacetylglucosamine-dolichylacetylglucosamine pyrophosphate acetylglucosaminyltransferase, N,N'-diacetylchitobiosylpyrophosphoryldolichol synthase) is an enzyme with systematic name UDP-N-acetyl-D-glucosamine:N-acetyl-D-glucosaminyl-diphosphodolichol N-acetyl-D-glucosaminyltransferase. This enzyme catalyses the following chemical reaction

UDP-N-acetyl-D-glucosamine + N-acetyl-D-glucosaminyl-diphosphodolichol $\rightleftharpoons$ UDP + N,N'-diacetylchitobiosyl-diphosphodolichol
