= Solbinsiran =

Small interfering RNA therapy

Clinical data
- Other names: LY3561774; LY-3561774

Legal status
- Legal status: Investigational

Identifiers
- CAS Number: 2718150-11-7
- UNII: 7RRX3XD4VY

Solbinsiran, is a GalNAc conjugated small interfering RNA (siRNA) therapy, that targets angiopoietin-like 3. It is developed by Eli Lilly and Company to reduce the level of apolipoprotein B and reduce the risk of cardiovascular disease.

== Mechanism of action ==
Solbinsiran is a GalNAc-conjugated Dicer-substrate siRNA (DsiRNA) that targets ANGPTL3 expression in the liver. ANGPTL3 plays a role in regulating lipid metabolism, and by inhibiting its expression, Solbinsiran aims to lower lipid levels, particularly triglycerides and low-density lipoprotein cholesterol (LDL-C) (Triglyceride Forum).

== Preclinical and Clinical Research ==
In preclinical studies, Solbinsiran demonstrated significant reductions in human ANGPTL3 mRNA expression in hepatocytes and a substantial reduction in circulating ANGPTL3 protein levels in cynomolgus monkeys (Triglyceride Forum). In Phase 1 studies, it showed potential as a therapeutic option for reducing ANGPTL3 levels and triglycerides (TG) in patients with dyslipidemia (Triglyceride Forum).

== Clinical applications ==
The therapy is currently investigational and has undergone testing in clinical settings for cardiovascular diseases.
