= Asialoglycoprotein receptor 1 =

Protein found in humans

ASGR1

Identifiers
- Aliases: ASGR1, ASGPR, ASGPR1, CLEC4H1, HL-1, asialoglycoprotein receptor 1
- External IDs: OMIM: 108360; MGI: 88081; GeneCards: ASGR1
Available structures
PDB	Ortholog search: PDBe RCSB
PDB	List of PDB id codes 1DV8

Gene location (Human)
Chr.	Chromosome 17 (human)
Band	17p13.1	Start	7,173,431 bp
Band	17p13.1	End	7,179,564 bp

Gene location (Mouse)
Chr.	Chromosome 11 (mouse)
Band	11 B3|11 42.98 cM	Start	69,944,911 bp
Band	11 B3|11 42.98 cM	End	69,948,720 bp
RNA expression pattern
Bgee	Human / Mouse (ortholog); Top expressed in: right lobe of liver; monocyte; granulocyte; left testis; cerebellar hemisphere; right hemisphere of cerebellum; right testis; ganglionic eminence; right frontal lobe; blood / Top expressed in: left lobe of liver; gallbladder; embryo; lacrimal gland; parotid gland; embryo; optic nerve; dentate gyrus of hippocampal formation granule cell; trachea; cerebellar cortex; More reference expression data
BioGPS	n/a
Gene ontology
Molecular function	protein binding; metal ion binding; carbohydrate binding; protein homodimerization activity; asialoglycoprotein receptor activity
Cellular component	integral component of membrane; extracellular region; integral component of plasma membrane; membrane; plasma membrane
Biological process	endocytosis; receptor-mediated endocytosis; cellular response to extracellular stimulus; protein N-linked glycosylation via asparagine; viral process
Sources:Amigo / QuickGO
Orthologs
Databases	NCBI: entry; OMA: entry
Species	Human	Mouse
Entrez	432	11889
Ensembl	ENSG00000141505	ENSMUSG00000020884
UniProt	P07306	P34927
RefSeq (mRNA)	NM_001197216; NM_001671	NM_001291131; NM_001291132; NM_009714
RefSeq (protein)	NP_001184145; NP_001662	NP_001278060; NP_001278061; NP_033844
Location (UCSC)	Chr 17: 7.17 – 7.18 Mb	Chr 11: 69.94 – 69.95 Mb
PubMed search
- Wikidata
View/Edit Human	View/Edit Mouse

Asialoglycoprotein receptor 1 is a protein that in humans is encoded by the ASGR1 gene.

== Function ==
This gene encodes a subunit of the asialoglycoprotein receptor. This receptor is a transmembrane protein that plays a critical role in serum glycoprotein homeostasis by mediating the endocytosis and lysosomal degradation of glycoproteins with exposed terminal galactose or N-acetylgalactosamine residues. The asialoglycoprotein receptor may facilitate hepatic infection by multiple viruses including hepatitis B, and is also a target for liver-specific drug delivery. The asialoglycoprotein receptor is a hetero-oligomeric protein composed of major and minor subunits, which are encoded by different genes. The protein encoded by this gene is the more abundant major subunit. Alternatively spliced transcript variants encoding multiple isoforms have been observed for this gene.
