= Glucuronyl-galactosyl-proteoglycan 4-a-N-acetylglucosaminyltransferase =

Class of enzymes

Glucuronyl-galactosyl-proteoglycan 4-alpha-N-acetylglucosaminyltransferase

Identifiers
- EC no.: 2.4.1.223
- CAS no.: 179241-74-8

Databases
- IntEnz: IntEnz view
- BRENDA: BRENDA entry
- ExPASy: NiceZyme view
- KEGG: KEGG entry
- MetaCyc: metabolic pathway
- PRIAM: profile
- PDB structures: RCSB PDB PDBe PDBsum
Search
- PMC: articles
- PubMed: articles
- NCBI: proteins

Glucuronyl-galactosyl-proteoglycan 4-alpha-N-acetylglucosaminyltransferase (EC 2.4.1.223, alpha-N-acetylglucosaminyltransferase I, alpha1,4-N-acetylglucosaminyltransferase, glucuronosylgalactosyl-proteoglycan 4-alpha-N-acetylglucosaminyltransferase) is an enzyme with systematic name UDP-N-acetyl-D-glucosamine:beta-D-glucuronosyl-(1->3)-beta-D-galactosyl-(1->3)-beta-D-galactosyl-(1->4)-beta-D-xylosyl-proteoglycan 4IV-alpha-N-acetyl-D-glucosaminyltransferase. This enzyme catalyses the following chemical reaction

UDP-N-acetyl-D-glucosamine + beta-D-glucuronosyl-(1->3)-beta-D-galactosyl-(1->3)-beta-D-galactosyl-(1->4)-beta-D-xylosyl-proteoglycan $\rightleftharpoons$ UDP + alpha-N-acetyl-D-glucosaminyl-(1->4)-beta-D-glucuronosyl-(1->3)-beta-D-galactosyl-(1->3)-beta-D-galactosyl-(1->4)-beta-D-xylosyl-proteoglycan

This enzyme is involved in the initiation of heparin and heparan sulfate synthesis.
