= Steroid N-acetylglucosaminyltransferase =

Class of enzymes

steroid N-acetylglucosaminyltransferase

Identifiers
- EC no.: 2.4.1.39
- CAS no.: 9033-56-1

Databases
- IntEnz: IntEnz view
- BRENDA: BRENDA entry
- ExPASy: NiceZyme view
- KEGG: KEGG entry
- MetaCyc: metabolic pathway
- PRIAM: profile
- PDB structures: RCSB PDB PDBe PDBsum
- Gene Ontology: AmiGO / QuickGO
Search
- PMC: articles
- PubMed: articles
- NCBI: proteins

In enzymology, a steroid N-acetylglucosaminyltransferase (EC 2.4.1.39) is an enzyme that catalyzes the chemical reaction

UDP-N-acetyl-D-glucosamine + estradiol-17alpha 3-D-glucuronoside $\rightleftharpoons$ UDP + 17alpha-(N-acetyl-D-glucosaminyl)-estradiol 3-D-glucuronoside

Thus, the two substrates of this enzyme are UDP-N-acetyl-D-glucosamine and estradiol-17alpha 3-D-glucuronoside, whereas its two products are UDP and 17alpha-(N-acetyl-D-glucosaminyl)-estradiol 3-D-glucuronoside.

This enzyme belongs to the family of glycosyltransferases, specifically the hexosyltransferases. The systematic name of this enzyme class is UDP-N-acetyl-D-glucosamine:estradiol-17alpha-3-D-glucuronoside 17alpha-N-acetylglucosaminyltransferase. Other names in common use include hydroxy steroid acetylglucosaminyltransferase, steroid acetylglucosaminyltransferase, uridine diphosphoacetylglucosamine-steroid, and acetylglucosaminyltransferase.
