= Asialoglycoprotein receptor =

Protein family

asialoglycoprotein receptor 1

Identifiers
- Symbol: ASGR1
- NCBI gene: 432
- HGNC: 742
- OMIM: 108360
- RefSeq: NM_001671
- UniProt: P07306

Other data
- Locus: Chr. 17 p13-p11
Search for
- Structures: Swiss-model
- Domains: InterPro

asialoglycoprotein receptor 2

Identifiers
- Symbol: ASGR2
- NCBI gene: 433
- HGNC: 743
- OMIM: 108361
- RefSeq: NM_080914
- UniProt: P07307

Other data
- Locus: Chr. 17 p
Search for
- Structures: Swiss-model
- Domains: InterPro

The asialoglycoprotein receptors (ASGPR) are lectins which bind asialoglycoprotein and glycoproteins from which a sialic acid has been removed to expose galactose residues. The receptors, which are integral membrane proteins and are located on mammalian hepatocytes (liver cells), remove target glycoproteins from circulation. The asialoglycoprotein receptor has been demonstrated to have high expression on the surface of hepatocytes and several human carcinoma cell lines It is also weakly expressed by glandular cells of the gallbladder and the stomach. Lactobionic acid has been used as a targeting moiety for drug delivery to cells expressing asialoglycoprotein receptors.

The asialoglycoprotein receptor contains two subunits, asialoglycoprotein receptor 1 (ASGR1) and asialoglycoprotein receptor 2 (ASGR2). These subunits may form different quaternary forms such as dimers, trimers, tetramers to allow for specific substrate binding or endocytosis. ASGR 1 is the major subunit and has 8 exons and is roughly 6 kb in length. ASGR 2 is the minor subunit and has 9 exons and is about 13.5 kb long.

== History ==
The asialoglycoprotein receptor was first characterized in 1968 by Morell et al. and was the first mammalian lectin identified. The researchers transferred radioactively-labeled ceruloplasmin that had undergone a reaction via the enzyme neuraminidase to remove the protein's terminal sialic acid, generating an asialoglycoprotein. Upon injection of the radioactive protein into rabbits, the radioactivity of the entire asialoglycoprotein (rather than a portion of the protein) quickly moved from the blood into the liver. This rapid movement from the blood into the liver only occurred if the sialic acid of the protein was removed; i.e., if the protein had an exposed galactose residue (that would normally be covered by the sialic acid). Thus, it was concluded that a receptor is capable of recognizing asialoglycoproteins (i.e., proteins that have lost their terminal sialic acids) and removing them from circulation by transporting them to the liver.

== Function ==
Asialoglycoprotein receptors function to catabolize galactosyl and N-acetylgalactosaminyl-containing substrates. More specifically, in most mammals, the asialoglycoprotein receptor removes glycoproteins that have had some of their sugars, particularly a terminal sialic acid, removed from the end of the protein.

== Mechanism of action ==
The human asialoglycoprotein receptors composed of two units, H1 and H2. Each of these units have their N-terminus within the cytoplasm of a liver cell, and a carbohydrate recognition domain (CRD) on the extracellular side. The CRD functions to bind to asialoglycoproteins through a calcium ion-mediated interaction. In particular, the hydroxyl groups of the terminal sugars (usually galactose) of the asialoglycoprotein form hydrogen bonds with the CRD of the asialoglycoprotein receptor; proper positioning and facilitation of these hydrogen bonds is caused by the presence of Ca2+.

=== Affinity of ASGPR to ASGP ===
The affinity of the ASGPR-ASGP interaction is dependent on factors including the number of sugars present on the ASGP. For example, ASGPs with a one galactose have a higher dissociation constant (i.e., a lower affinity interaction) compared an ASGP with several sugars attached. This increased affinity in the presence of more sugars is likely due to the formation of more interactions between the carbohydrate recognition domain of the ASGPR and the sugars on the ASGP. The affinity of the interaction is also mediated by the modifications of the terminal galactose; for example, ASGPs with N-acetylgalactosamine have a higher affinity interaction for the ASGPR compared to ASGPs with a galactose.
