= N-acetyllactosaminide beta-1,6-N-acetylglucosaminyl-transferase =

Class of enzymes

N-acetyllactosaminide beta-1,6-N-acetylglucosaminyltransferase

Identifiers
- EC no.: 2.4.1.150
- CAS no.: 85638-40-0

Databases
- BRENDA: enzyme data
- ExPASy: NiceZyme view
- KEGG: enzyme entry
- MetaCyc: metabolic pathway
- Rhea: reactions
- PDB structures: RCSB PDB PDBe PDBsum
- Gene Ontology: AmiGO / QuickGO
Search
- PMC: articles
- PubMed: articles
- NCBI: proteins

In enzymology, a N-acetyllactosaminide beta-1,6-N-acetylglucosaminyl-transferase (EC 2.4.1.150) is an enzyme that catalyzes the chemical reaction

UDP-N-acetyl-D-glucosamine + beta-D-galactosyl-1,4-N-acetyl-D-glucosaminyl-R $\rightleftharpoons$ UDP + N-acetyl-beta-D-glucosaminyl-1,6-beta-D-galactosyl-1,4-N-acetyl-D- glucosaminyl-R

Thus, the two substrates of this enzyme are UDP-N-acetyl-D-glucosamine and beta-D-galactosyl-1,4-N-acetyl-D-glucosaminyl-R, whereas its 3 products are UDP, N-acetyl-beta-D-glucosaminyl-1,6-beta-D-galactosyl-1,4-N-acetyl-D-, and glucosaminyl-R.

This enzyme belongs to the family of glycosyltransferases, specifically the hexosyltransferases. The systematic name of this enzyme class is UDP-N-acetyl-D-glucosamine:beta-D-galactosyl-1,4-N-acetyl-D-glucosaminide beta-1,6-N-acetyl-D-glucosaminyltransferase. Other names in common use include N-acetylglucosaminyltransferase, uridine diphosphoacetylglucosamine-acetyllactosaminide, beta1->6-acetylglucosaminyltransferase, Galbeta1->4GlcNAc-R beta1->6 N-acetylglucosaminyltransferase, and UDP-GlcNAc:Gal-R, beta-D-6-N-acetylglucosaminyltransferase. This enzyme participates in glycosphingolipid biosynthesis - neo-lactoseries and glycan structures - biosynthesis 2.
