= A-1,3-mannosyl-glycoprotein 4-b-N-acetylglucosaminyltransferase =

Class of enzymes

Alpha-1,3-mannosyl-glycoprotein 4-beta-N-acetylglucosaminyltransferase

Identifiers
- EC no.: 2.4.1.145
- CAS no.: 86498-16-0

Databases
- IntEnz: IntEnz view
- BRENDA: BRENDA entry
- ExPASy: NiceZyme view
- KEGG: KEGG entry
- MetaCyc: metabolic pathway
- PRIAM: profile
- PDB structures: RCSB PDB PDBe PDBsum
Search
- PMC: articles
- PubMed: articles
- NCBI: proteins

Alpha-1,3-mannosyl-glycoprotein 4-beta-N-acetylglucosaminyltransferase (EC 2.4.1.145, N-acetylglucosaminyltransferase IV, N-glycosyl-oligosaccharide-glycoprotein N-acetylglucosaminyltransferase IV, beta-acetylglucosaminyltransferase IV, uridine diphosphoacetylglucosamine-glycopeptide beta4-acetylglucosaminyltransferase IV, alpha-1,3-mannosylglycoprotein beta-1,4-N-acetylglucosaminyltransferase, GnTIV) is an enzyme with systematic name UDP-N-acetyl-D-glucosamine:3-(2-(N-acetyl-beta-D-glucosaminyl)-alpha-D-mannosyl)-glycoprotein 4-beta-N-acetyl-D-glucosaminyltransferase. This enzyme catalyses the following chemical reaction

UDP-N-acetyl-D-glucosamine + 3-(2-[N-acetyl-beta-D-glucosaminyl]-alpha-D-mannosyl)-beta-D-mannosyl-R $\rightleftharpoons$ UDP + 3-(2,4-bis[N-acetyl-beta-D-glucosaminyl]-alpha-D-mannosyl)-beta-D-mannosyl-R

R represents the remainder of the N-linked oligosaccharide in the glycoprotein acceptor.
