= Coarse facial features =

Coarse facies
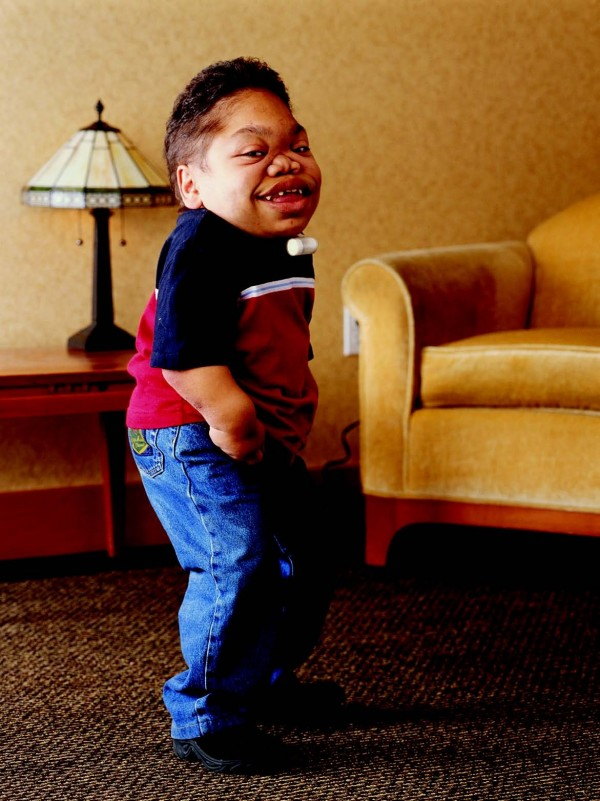
- A 16 year old with Mucopolysaccharidosis showing coarse facial features.
- Specialty: Medical genetics

Coarse facial features (coarse facies) is a constellation of facial features that are present in many inborn errors of metabolism and other progressive diseases.

Features include:

- large, bulging head
- prominent scalp veins
- "saddle-like, flat bridged nose with broad, fleshy tip"
- large lips and tongue
- small, widely spaced and/or malformed teeth
- hypertrophic alveolar ridges and/or gums

The head tends to be longer than normal from front to back, with a bulging forehead. This is because of the premature fusion of skull bones in the affected person.

== Causes ==
Several conditions are associated with coarse facial features.

- Acromegaly
- Alpha-mannosidosis
- Aspartylglycosaminuria
- Battaglia-Neri syndrome
- Börjeson–Forssman–Lehmann syndrome
- Chromosome 6q deletion syndrome
- Infantile hypotonia with psychomotor retardation and characteristic facies-3
- Congenital hypothyroidism
- Pettigrew syndrome
- Dyggve–Melchior–Clausen syndrome
- Fucosidosis type 1
- GM1-gangliosidosis type I
- GM1-gangliosidosis type III
- GM1 gangliosidosis
- Goldberg syndrome
- Hyde-Forster syndrome
- Hyper IgE (Job Syndrome)
- Hypomelanosis of Ito
- I cell disease
- Immunodeficiency due to defect in MAPBP-interacting protein
- Infantile sialic acid storage disorder
- Mannosidosis (alpha B lysosomal)
- McCune–Albright syndrome
- Mental retardation (X-linked - epilepsy - progressive joint contractures - typical face)
- Mental retardation (X-linked Raynaud type)
- Miescher's syndrome
- Morquio syndrome
- Morquio syndrome type A
- Morquio syndrome type B
- MPS 3 C
- MPS 3 D
- Mucolipidosis III
- Mucopolysaccharidosis type IIA
- Mucopolysaccharidosis type IIB
- Mucopolysaccharidosis type III
- Mucopolysaccharidosis type VI
- Mucopolysaccharidosis type VII
- Mucopolysaccharidosis type Ih
- Mucopolysaccharidosis type Ih/s
- Mucopolysaccharidosis type I Scheie syndrome
- Multiple endocrine abnormalities - adenylyl cyclase dysfunction
- Multiple endocrine neoplasia type 2B
- Neuraminidase deficiency (type II juvenile form)
- Nodulosis–arthropathy–osteolysis syndrome
- Nonkeratan-sulfate-excreting Morquio syndrome
- Pituitary tumors (adult)
- Resistance to Thyroid Hormone Alpha.(3)
- Sialidosis type II (congenital)
- Sialidosis type II (infantile)
- Sialuria syndrome
- Simpson–Golabi–Behmel syndrome
- Simpson–Golabi–Behmel syndrome - type 1 (SGBS1)
- Skeletal dysplasia - coarse facies - mental retardation
- Spondyloepimetaphyseal dysplasia (genevieve type)
- Sulfatidosis juvenile (Austin type)
- Winchester syndrome

== See also ==
- Facies (medical)
