= Alpha-1,6-mannosyl-glycoprotein 4-b-N-acetylglucosaminyltransferase =

Class of enzymes

Alpha-1,6-mannosyl-glycoprotein 4-beta-N-acetylglucosaminyltransferase

Identifiers
- EC no.: 2.4.1.201
- CAS no.: 119699-68-2

Databases
- IntEnz: IntEnz view
- BRENDA: BRENDA entry
- ExPASy: NiceZyme view
- KEGG: KEGG entry
- MetaCyc: metabolic pathway
- PRIAM: profile
- PDB structures: RCSB PDB PDBe PDBsum
Search
- PMC: articles
- PubMed: articles
- NCBI: proteins

Alpha-1,6-mannosyl-glycoprotein 4-beta-N-acetylglucosaminyltransferase (EC 2.4.1.201, N-acetylglucosaminyltransferase VI, N-glycosyl-oligosaccharide-glycoprotein N-acetylglucosaminyltransferase VI, uridine diphosphoacetylglucosamine-glycopeptide beta-1->4-acetylglucosaminyltransferase VI, mannosyl-glycoprotein beta-1,4-N-acetylglucosaminyltransferase, GnTVI) is an enzyme with systematic name UDP-N-acetyl-D-glucosamine:2,6-bis(N-acetyl-beta-D-glucosaminyl)-alpha-D-mannosyl-glycoprotein 4-beta-N-acetyl-D-glucosaminyltransferase. This enzyme catalyses the following chemical reaction

UDP-N-acetyl-D-glucosamine + 2,6-bis(N-acetyl-beta-D-glucosaminyl)-alpha-D-mannosyl-R $\rightleftharpoons$ UDP + 2,4,6-tris(N-acetyl-beta-D-glucosaminyl)-alpha-D-mannosyl-R

R represents the remainder of the N-linked oligosaccharide in the glycoprotein acceptor.
