= N-acylmannosamine 1-dehydrogenase =

Identifiers
- EC no.: 1.1.1.233
- CAS no.: 117698-08-5

Databases
- IntEnz: IntEnz view
- BRENDA: BRENDA entry
- ExPASy: NiceZyme view
- KEGG: KEGG entry
- MetaCyc: metabolic pathway
- PRIAM: profile
- PDB structures: RCSB PDB PDBe PDBsum
- Gene Ontology: AmiGO / QuickGO
Search
- PMC: articles
- PubMed: articles
- NCBI: proteins

In enzymology, a N-acylmannosamine 1-dehydrogenase (EC 1.1.1.233) is an enzyme that catalyzes the chemical reaction

N-acyl-D-mannosamine + NAD^{+} $\rightleftharpoons$ N-acyl-D-mannosaminolactone + NADH + H^{+}

Thus, the two substrates of this enzyme are N-acyl-D-mannosamine and NAD^{+}, whereas its 3 products are N-acyl-D-mannosaminolactone, NADH, and H^{+}.

This enzyme belongs to the family of oxidoreductases, specifically those acting on the CH-OH group of donor with NAD^{+} or NADP^{+} as acceptor. The systematic name of this enzyme class is N-acyl-D-mannosamine:NAD^{+} 1-oxidoreductase. Other names in common use include N-acylmannosamine dehydrogenase, N-acetyl-D-mannosamine dehydrogenase, N-acyl-D-mannosamine dehydrogenase, and N-acylmannosamine dehydrogenase.
