= Lipopolysaccharide N-acetylglucosaminyltransferase =

Class of enzymes

lipopolysaccharide N-acetylglucosaminyltransferase

Identifiers
- EC no.: 2.4.1.56
- CAS no.: 37277-64-8

Databases
- IntEnz: IntEnz view
- BRENDA: BRENDA entry
- ExPASy: NiceZyme view
- KEGG: KEGG entry
- MetaCyc: metabolic pathway
- PRIAM: profile
- PDB structures: RCSB PDB PDBe PDBsum
- Gene Ontology: AmiGO / QuickGO
Search
- PMC: articles
- PubMed: articles
- NCBI: proteins

In enzymology, a lipopolysaccharide N-acetylglucosaminyltransferase (EC 2.4.1.56) is an enzyme that catalyzes the chemical reaction

UDP-N-acetyl-D-glucosamine + lipopolysaccharide $\rightleftharpoons$ UDP + N-acetyl-D-glucosaminyllipopolysaccharide

Thus, the two substrates of this enzyme are UDP-N-acetyl-D-glucosamine and lipopolysaccharide, whereas its two products are UDP and N-acetyl-D-glucosaminyllipopolysaccharide.

This enzyme participates in lipopolysaccharide biosynthesis and glycan structures - biosynthesis 2.

== Nomenclature ==
This enzyme belongs to the family of glycosyltransferases, specifically the hexosyltransferases. The systematic name of this enzyme class is UDP-N-acetyl-D-glucosamine:lipopolysaccharide N-acetyl-D-glucosaminyltransferase. Other names in common use include UDP-N-acetylglucosamine-lipopolysaccharide, N-acetylglucosaminyltransferase, uridine diphosphoacetylglucosamine-lipopolysaccharide, and acetylglucosaminyltransferase.
