= Poly(ribitol-phosphate) N-acetylglucosaminyl-transferase =

Class of enzymes

poly(ribitol-phosphate) N-acetylglucosaminyltransferase

Identifiers
- EC no.: 2.4.1.70
- CAS no.: 37277-71-7

Databases
- IntEnz: IntEnz view
- BRENDA: BRENDA entry
- ExPASy: NiceZyme view
- KEGG: KEGG entry
- MetaCyc: metabolic pathway
- PRIAM: profile
- PDB structures: RCSB PDB PDBe PDBsum
- Gene Ontology: AmiGO / QuickGO
Search
- PMC: articles
- PubMed: articles
- NCBI: proteins

In enzymology, a poly(ribitol-phosphate) N-acetylglucosaminyl-transferase (EC 2.4.1.70) is an enzyme that catalyzes the chemical reaction

UDP-N-acetyl-D-glucosamine + poly(ribitol phosphate) $\rightleftharpoons$ UDP + (N-acetyl-D-glucosaminyl)poly(ribitol phosphate)

Thus, the two substrates of this enzyme are UDP-N-acetyl-D-glucosamine and poly(ribitol phosphate), whereas its two products are UDP and (N-acetyl-D-glucosaminyl)poly(ribitol phosphate).

This enzyme belongs to the family of glycosyltransferases, specifically the hexosyltransferases. The systematic name of this enzyme class is UDP-N-acetyl-D-glucosamine:poly(ribitol-phosphate) N-acetyl-D-glucosaminyltransferase. Other names in common use include UDP acetylglucosamine-poly(ribitol phosphate), acetylglucosaminyltransferase, uridine diphosphoacetylglucosamine-poly(ribitol phosphate), and acetylglucosaminyltransferase.
