= N-acetylneuraminate epimerase =

Identifiers
- EC no.: 5.1.3.24

Databases
- IntEnz: IntEnz view
- BRENDA: BRENDA entry
- ExPASy: NiceZyme view
- KEGG: KEGG entry
- MetaCyc: metabolic pathway
- PRIAM: profile
- PDB structures: RCSB PDB PDBe PDBsum
Search
- PMC: articles
- PubMed: articles
- NCBI: proteins

N-acetylneuraminate epimerase (EC 5.1.3.24, sialic acid epimerase, N-acetylneuraminate mutarotase, sialic acid mutarotase, YjhT, NanM) is an enzyme with systematic name N-acetyl-alpha-neuraminate 2-epimerase. This enzyme catalyses the following chemical reaction

N-acetyl-alpha-neuraminate $\rightleftharpoons$ N-acetyl-beta-neuraminate

Sialoglycoconjugates present in vertebrates are linked exclusively by alpha-linkages.

== See also ==
- sialic acid
  - N-acetylneuraminate
- Mutarotation
