= Β-N-Acetylgalactosaminidase =

Enzyme

β-N-Acetylgalactosaminidase

Identifiers
- EC no.: 3.2.1.53
- CAS no.: 9054-43-7

Databases
- IntEnz: IntEnz view
- BRENDA: BRENDA entry
- ExPASy: NiceZyme view
- KEGG: KEGG entry
- MetaCyc: metabolic pathway
- PRIAM: profile
- PDB structures: RCSB PDB PDBe PDBsum
Search
- PMC: articles
- PubMed: articles
- NCBI: proteins

β-N-Acetylgalactosaminidase (EC 3.2.1.53, N-acetyl-β-galactosaminidase, N-acetyl-β-D-galactosaminidase, β-acetylgalactosaminidase, β-D-N-acetylgalactosaminidase, N-acetylgalactosaminidase) is an enzyme with systematic name β-N-acetyl-D-galactosaminide N-acetylgalactosaminohydrolase. It catalyses the hydrolysis of terminal non-reducing N-acetyl-D-galactosamine residues in N-acetyl-β-D-galactosaminides.
