= Neuraminic acid =

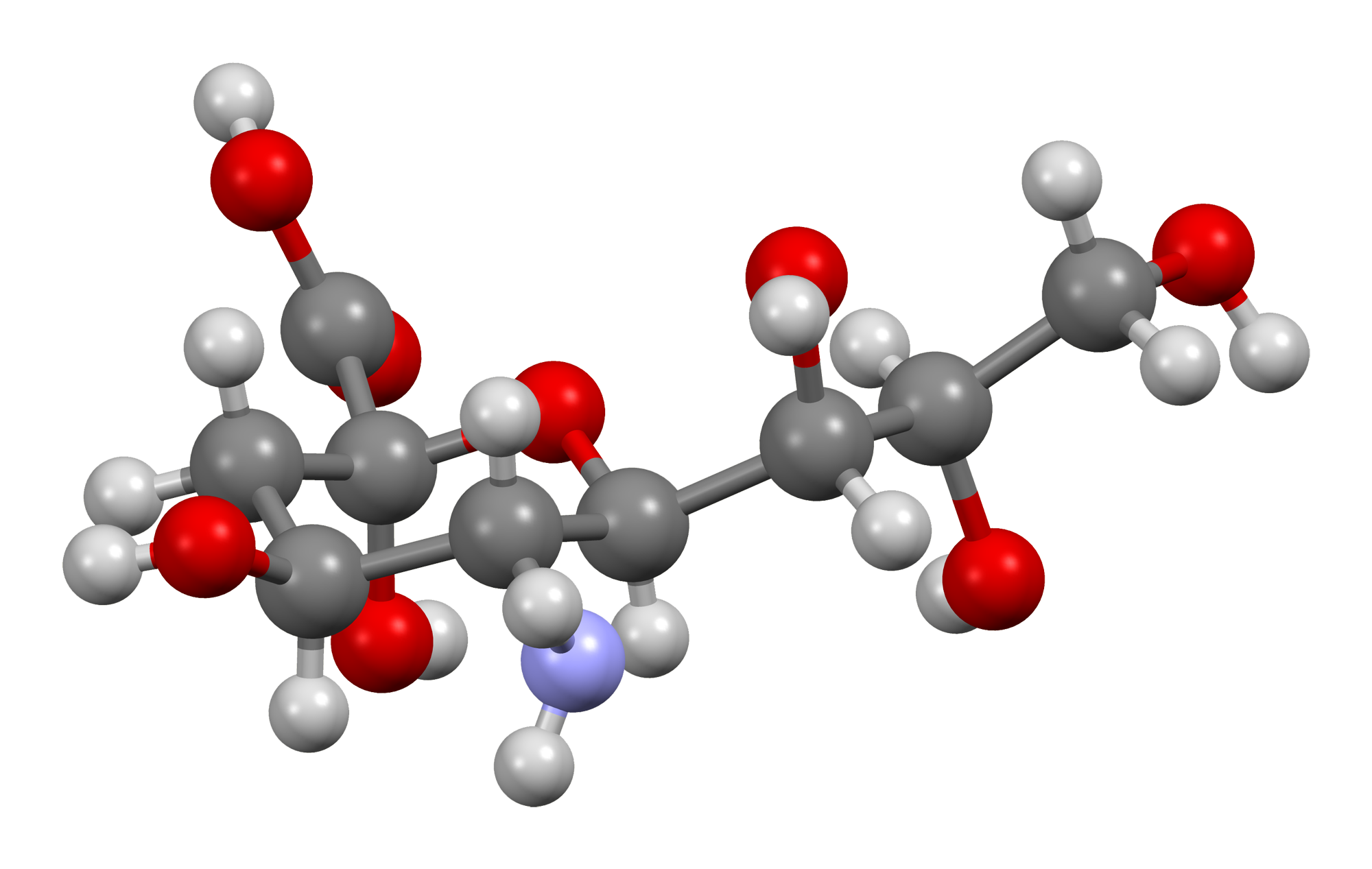

Names
- IUPAC name 5-Amino-3,5-dideoxy-d-glycero-d-galacto-non-2-ulosonic acid
- Systematic IUPAC name (4S,5R,6R,7S,8R)-5-Amino-4,6,7,8,9-pentahydroxy-2-oxononanoic acid

Identifiers
CAS Number	114-04-5
3D model (JSmol)	Interactive image
ChEBI	CHEBI:49022
ChEMBL	ChEMBL165084; ChEMBL1234621
ChemSpider	447972
MeSH	Neuraminic+Acids
PubChem CID	513472
UNII	L4866H38XY
CompTox Dashboard (EPA)	DTXSID401316250
- InChI: InChI=1S/C9H17NO8/c10-5-3(12)1-9(17,8(15)16)18-7(5)6(14)4(13)2-11/h3-7,11-14,17H,1-2,10H2,(H,15,16)/t3-,4+,5+,6+,7+,9-/m0/s1 Key: CERZMXAJYMMUDR-YOQZMRDMSA-N; InChI=1/C9H17NO8/c10-5-3(12)1-9(17,8(15)16)18-7(5)6(14)4(13)2-11/h3-7,11-14,17H,1-2,10H2,(H,15,16)/t3-,4+,5+,6+,7+,9-/m0/s1 Key: CERZMXAJYMMUDR-YOQZMRDMBH
- SMILES: O=C(O)[C@@]1(O)O[C@@H]([C@H](O)[C@H](O)CO)[C@H](N)[C@@H](O)C1

Properties
Chemical formula	C_{9}H_{17}NO_{8}
Molar mass	267.233 g/mol
- Except where otherwise noted, data are given for materials in their standard state (at 25 °C [77 °F], 100 kPa). verify (what is ?) Infobox references

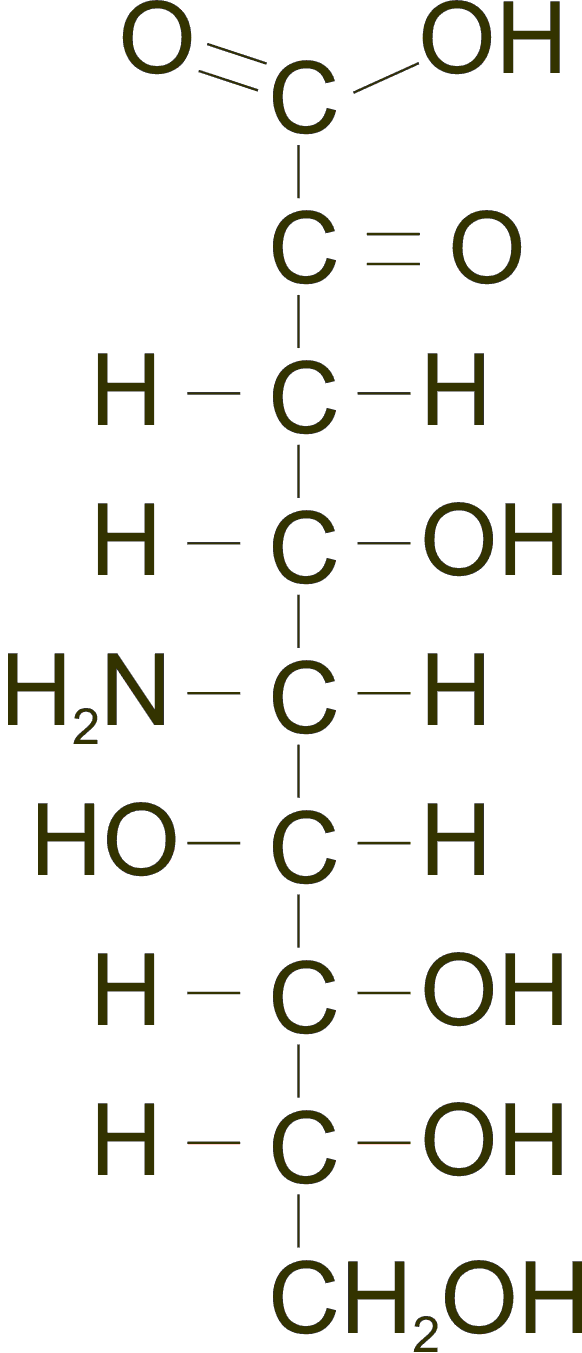
Two-dimensional representation of neuraminic acid in its straight chain form.

Neuraminic acid (5-amino-3,5-dideoxy-D-glycero-D-galacto-non-2-ulosonic acid) is an acidic (in particular ulosonic) amino sugar with a backbone formed by nine carbon atoms. Although nine-carbon sugars do not occur naturally, neuraminic acid may be regarded as a theoretical nine-carbon ketose in which the first link of the chain (the –CH_{2}OH at position 1) is oxidised into a carboxyl group (–C(=O)OH), the hydroxyl group at position 3 is deoxidised (oxygen is removed from it), and the hydroxyl group at position 5 is substituted with an amino group (–NH_{2}). Neuraminic acid may also be visualized as the product of an aldol-condensation of pyruvic acid and D-mannosamine (2-amino-2-deoxy-mannose).

Neuraminic acid does not occur naturally, but many of its derivatives are found widely distributed in animal tissues and in bacteria, especially in glycoproteins and gangliosides. The N- or O-substituted derivatives of neuraminic acid are collectively known as sialic acids, the predominant form in vertebrate cells being the acetylated N-acetylneuraminic acid. The amino group bears either an acetyl or a glycolyl group, the latter being N-glycolylneuraminic acid. The hydroxyl substituents may vary considerably: acetyl, lactyl, methyl, sulfate and phosphate groups have been found.

== History ==
The name "neuraminic acid" was introduced by German scientist Ernst Klenk in 1941, in reference to the brain lipids from which it was derived as a cleavage product from treatment with methanolic hydrochloric acid. The compound which Klenk actually produced is now known to have been de-acetylated sialic acid from treatment with methanolic hydrochloric acid, and had been sialic acid in vivo. Sialic acid had previously been isolated intact by Gunnar Blix in 1936 from bovine submaxillary glands. Blix continued improving his purification protocol and named the compound "sialic acid" in 1952, publishing his conclusion that Klenk's compound was the de-actylated version, which Klenk later confirmed. In 1957 Blix, Klenk, and another biochemist working on sialic acids named Alfred Gottschalk jointly published a brief note in Nature agreeing to the nomenclature of "neuraminic acid" as being the encompassing group, with "sialic acid" among other substituted derivatives. Regarding the enzymes which cleave the monosaccharide residues in general, they stated that either "neuraminidase" or "sialidase" could be used, which has led to confusion in the field as viral neuraminidases in fact bind only sialic acid.

== Nomenclature ==
The IUPAC symbol used for neuraminic acid is Neu, and the residue is typically found with additional chemical modifications in biological systems. As a family, these residues are known as sialic acids. For example, N-acetylneuraminic acid, Neu5Ac, is typical in human glycoproteins. The Symbol Nomenclature for Glycans is a brown diamond.

== Biological functions ==
Among their many biological functions, these structures are substrates for neuraminidase enzymes which cleave neuraminic acid residues. Human flu viruses have a neuraminidase enzyme, signified in the name "H#N#", where the H refers to an isoform of hemagglutinin and N refers to an isoform of viral neuraminidase.

== See also ==
- Sialic acid
- N-Acetylneuraminic acid
- N-Glycolylneuraminic acid
