= Glycoconjugate =

Biochemical classification for carbohydrates

In molecular biology and biochemistry, glycoconjugates are a subfamily for carbohydrates where saccharides are covalently linked with proteins, peptides, lipids. Glycoconjugates are formed in processes termed glycosylation. Glycoconjugates are involved in cell–cell interaction, including cell–cell recognition; in cell–matrix interactions; and in detoxification processes.

Although the important molecular species DNA, RNA, ATP, cAMP, cGMP, NADH, NADPH, and coenzyme A all contain a carbohydrate part, generally they are not considered as glycoconjugates.

Glycans can be found attached to proteins as in glycoproteins and proteoglycans. In general, they are found on the exterior surface of cells. O- and N-linked glycans are very common in eukaryotes but may also be found, although less commonly, in prokaryotes.

== N-linked glycans ==
N-linked glycans are attached in the endoplasmic reticulum to the nitrogen (N) in the side chain of asparagine (Asn) in the sequon. The sequon is an Asn-X-Ser or Asn-X-Thr sequence, where X is any amino acid except proline and the glycan may be composed of N-acetylgalactosamine, galactose, neuraminic acid, N-acetylglucosamine, fucose, mannose, and other monosaccharides.

=== Assembly ===
In eukaryotes, N-linked glycans are derived from a core 14-sugar unit assembled in the cytoplasm and endoplasmic reticulum. First, two N-acetylglucosamine residues are attached to dolichol monophosphate, a lipid, on the external side of the endoplasmic reticulum membrane. Five mannose residues are then added to this structure. At this point, the partially finished core glycan is flipped across the endoplasmic reticulum membrane, so that it is now located within the reticular lumen. Assembly then continues within the endoplasmic reticulum, with the addition of four more mannose residues. Finally, three glucose residues are added to this structure. Following full assembly, the glycan is transferred en bloc by the glycosyltransferase oligosaccharyltransferase to a nascent peptide chain, within the reticular lumen. This core structure of N-linked glycans, thus, consists of 14 residues (3 glucose, 9 mannose, and 2 N-acetylglucosamine).

=== Processing, modification, and diversity ===
Once transferred to the nascent peptide chain, N-linked glycans, in general, undergo extensive processing reactions, whereby the three glucose residues are removed, as well as several mannose residues, depending on the N-linked glycan in question. The removal of the glucose residues is dependent on proper protein folding. These processing reactions occur in the Golgi apparatus. Modification reactions may involve the addition of a phosphate or acetyl group onto the sugars, or the addition of new sugars, such as neuraminic acid. Processing and modification of N-linked glycans within the Golgi does not follow a linear pathway. As a result, many different variations of N-linked glycan structure are possible, depending on enzyme activity in the Golgi.

=== Functions ===
N-linked glycans are extremely important in proper protein folding in eukaryotic cells. Chaperone proteins in the endoplasmic reticulum, such as calnexin and calreticulin, bind to the three glucose residues present on the core N-linked glycan. These chaperone proteins then serve to aid in the folding of the protein that the glycan is attached to. Following proper folding, the three glucose residues are removed, and the glycan moves on to further processing reactions. If the protein fails to fold properly, the three glucose residues are reattached, allowing the protein to re-associate with the chaperones. This cycle may repeat several times until a protein reaches its proper conformation. If a protein repeatedly fails to properly fold, it is excreted from the endoplasmic reticulum and degraded by cytoplasmic proteases.

N-linked glycans also contribute to protein folding by steric effects. For example, cysteine residues in the peptide may be temporarily blocked from forming disulfide bonds with other cysteine residues, due to the size of a nearby glycan. Therefore, the presence of a N-linked glycan allows the cell to control which cysteine residues will form disulfide bonds.

N-linked glycans also play an important role in cell-cell interactions. For example, tumour cells make N-linked glycans that are abnormal. These are recognized by the CD337 receptor on natural killer cells as a sign that the cell in question is cancerous.

Within the immune system the N-linked glycans on an immune cell's surface will help dictate that migration pattern of the cell, e.g. immune cells that migrate to the skin have specific glycosylations that favor homing to that site. The glycosylation patterns on the various immunoglobulins including IgE, IgM, IgD, IgE, IgA, and IgG bestow them with unique effector functions by altering their affinities for Fc and other immune receptors. Glycans may also be involved in "self" and "non-self" discrimination, which may be relevant to the pathophysiology of various autoimmune diseases; including rheumatoid arthritis and type 1 diabetes.

The targeting of degradative lysosomal enzymes is also accomplished by N-linked glycans. The modification of an N-linked glycan with a mannose-6-phosphate residue serves as a signal that the protein to which this glycan is attached should be moved to the lysosome. This recognition and trafficking of lysosomal enzymes by the presence of mannose-6-phosphate is accomplished by two proteins: CI-MPR (cation-independent mannose-6-phosphate receptor) and CD-MPR (cation-dependent mannose-6-phosphate receptor).

== O-Linked glycans ==
In eukaryotes, O-linked glycans are assembled one sugar at a time on a serine or threonine residue of a peptide chain in the Golgi apparatus. Unlike N-linked glycans, there is no known consensus sequence yet. However, the placement of a proline residue at either -1 or +3 relative to the serine or threonine is favourable for O-linked glycosylation. The first monosaccharide attached in the synthesis of O-linked glycans is N-acetyl-galactosamine. After this, several different pathways are possible. A Core 1 structure is generated by the addition of galactose. A Core 2 structure is generated by the addition of N-acetyl-glucosamine to the N-acetyl-galactosamine of the Core 1 structure. Core 3 structures are generated by the addition of a single N-acetyl-glucosamine to the original N-acetyl-galactosamine. Core 4 structures are generated by the addition of a second N-acetyl-glucosamine to the Core 3 structure. Other core structures are possible, though less common.

Images:

https://www.ncbi.nlm.nih.gov/books/NBK20721/figure/A561/ : Core 1 and Core 2 generation. White square = N-acetyl-galactosamine; black circle = galactose; Black square = N-acetyl-glucosamine. Note: There is a mistake in this diagram. The bottom square should always be white in each image, not black.

https://www.ncbi.nlm.nih.gov/books/NBK20721/figure/A562/ : Core 3 and Core 4 generation.

A common structural theme in O-linked glycans is the addition of polylactosamine units to the various core structures. These are formed by the repetitive addition of galactose and N-acetyl-glucosamine units. Polylactosamine chains on O-linked glycans are often capped by the addition of a sialic acid residue (similar to neuraminic acid). If a fucose residue is also added, to the next to penultimate residue, a Sialyl-Lewis X (SLex) structure is formed.

=== Functions ===
Sialyl lewis x is important in ABO blood antigen determination.

SLex is also important to proper immune response. P-selectin release from Weibel-Palade bodies, on blood vessel endothelial cells, can be induced by a number of factors. One such factor is the response of the endothelial cell to certain bacterial molecules, such as peptidoglycan. P-selectin binds to the SLex structure that is present on neutrophils in the bloodstream and helps to mediate the extravasation of these cells into the surrounding tissue during infection.

O-linked glycans, in particular mucin, have been found to be important in developing normal intestinal microflora. Certain strains of intestinal bacteria bind specifically to mucin, allowing them to colonize the intestine.

Examples of O-linked glycoproteins are:

- Glycophorin, a protein in erythrocyte cell membranes
- Mucin, a protein in saliva involved in formation of dental plaque
- Notch, a transmembrane receptor involved in development and cell fate decisions
- Thrombospondin
- Factor VII
- Factor IX
- Urinary type plasminogen activator

== Glycosaminoglycans ==
Another type of cellular glycan is the glycosaminoglycans (GAGs). These comprise 2-aminosugars linked in an alternating fashion with uronic acids, and include polymers such as heparin, heparan sulfate, chondroitin, keratan and dermatan. Some glycosaminoglycans, such as heparan sulfate, are found attached to the cell surface, where they are linked through a tetrasacharide linker via a xylosyl residue to a protein (forming a glycoprotein or proteoglycan).
