= Sialin =

Protein-coding gene in the species Homo sapiens

SLC17A5

Identifiers
- Aliases: SLC17A5, AST, ISSD, NSD, SD, SIALIN, SIASD, SLD, solute carrier family 17 member 5
- External IDs: OMIM: 604322; MGI: 1924105; GeneCards: SLC17A5

Gene location (Human)
Chr.	Chromosome 6 (human)
Band	6q13	Start	73,593,379 bp
Band	6q13	End	73,653,992 bp

Gene location (Mouse)
Chr.	Chromosome 9 (mouse)
Band	9|9 E1	Start	78,443,770 bp
Band	9|9 E1	End	78,495,323 bp
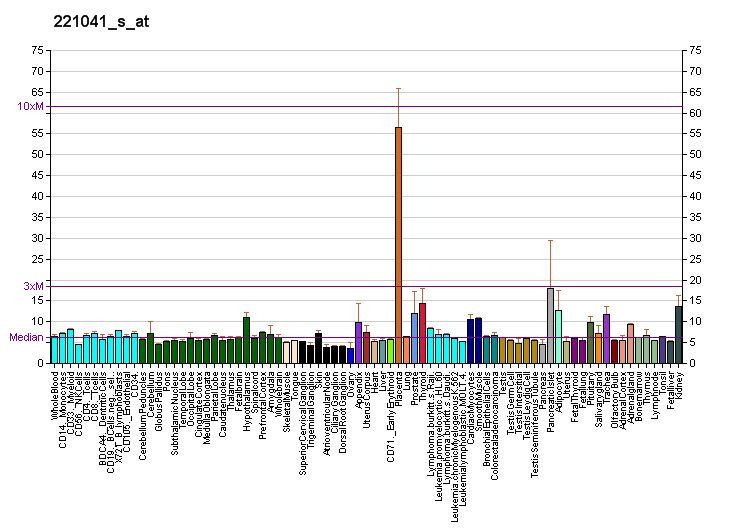
RNA expression pattern
Bgee	Human / Mouse (ortholog); Top expressed in: corpus epididymis; stromal cell of endometrium; mucosa of sigmoid colon; germinal epithelium; mucosa of ileum; jejunal mucosa; visceral pleura; right lobe of thyroid gland; synovial joint; islet of Langerhans / Top expressed in: epithelium of small intestine; lacrimal gland; parotid gland; submandibular gland; proximal tubule; right kidney; renal corpuscle; ileum; human kidney; hand; More reference expression data
BioGPS	More reference expression data
Gene ontology
Molecular function	carbohydrate:proton symporter activity; sialic acid transmembrane transporter activity; symporter activity; sialic acid:proton symporter activity
Cellular component	integral component of membrane; membrane; plasma membrane; synapse; integral component of plasma membrane; synaptic vesicle membrane; lysosomal membrane; cell junction; lysosome; cytoplasmic vesicle; cytosol
Biological process	sialic acid transport; ion transport; anion transport; amino acid transport; transmembrane transport; carboxylic acid transmembrane transport; transport; response to bacterium; carbohydrate transmembrane transport; proton transmembrane transport
Sources:Amigo / QuickGO
Orthologs
Databases	NCBI: entry; OMA: entry
Species	Human	Mouse
Entrez	26503	235504
Ensembl	ENSG00000119899	ENSMUSG00000049624
UniProt	Q9NRA2	Q8BN82
RefSeq (mRNA)	NM_012434	NM_001276452; NM_172773
RefSeq (protein)	NP_036566; NP_001369558; NP_001369559; NP_001369560; NP_001369561 NP_001369562; NP_001369563; NP_001369564; NP_001369565	NP_001263381; NP_766361
Location (UCSC)	Chr 6: 73.59 – 73.65 Mb	Chr 9: 78.44 – 78.5 Mb
PubMed search
- Wikidata
View/Edit Human	View/Edit Mouse

Sialin, also known as H(+)/nitrate cotransporter and H(+)/sialic acid cotransporter, is a protein which in humans is encoded by the SLC17A5 gene.

In a 2001 study of the experimental group-B-streptococcal polysaccharide CM101, the human SLC17A5 gene product was called HP59 (with a sheep sequence called SP55).

== Clinical significance ==
A deficiency of this protein causes Salla disease. and Infantile Sialic Acid Storage Disease (ISSD).

The gene for HP59 contains, entirely within its coding region, the Sialin Gene SLC17A5. Member 5, also known as SLC17A5 or sialin is a lysosomal membrane sialic acid transport protein which in humans is encoded by the SLC17A5 gene on Chromosome 6

== See also ==
- Solute carrier family
