= Symbol Nomenclature For Glycans =

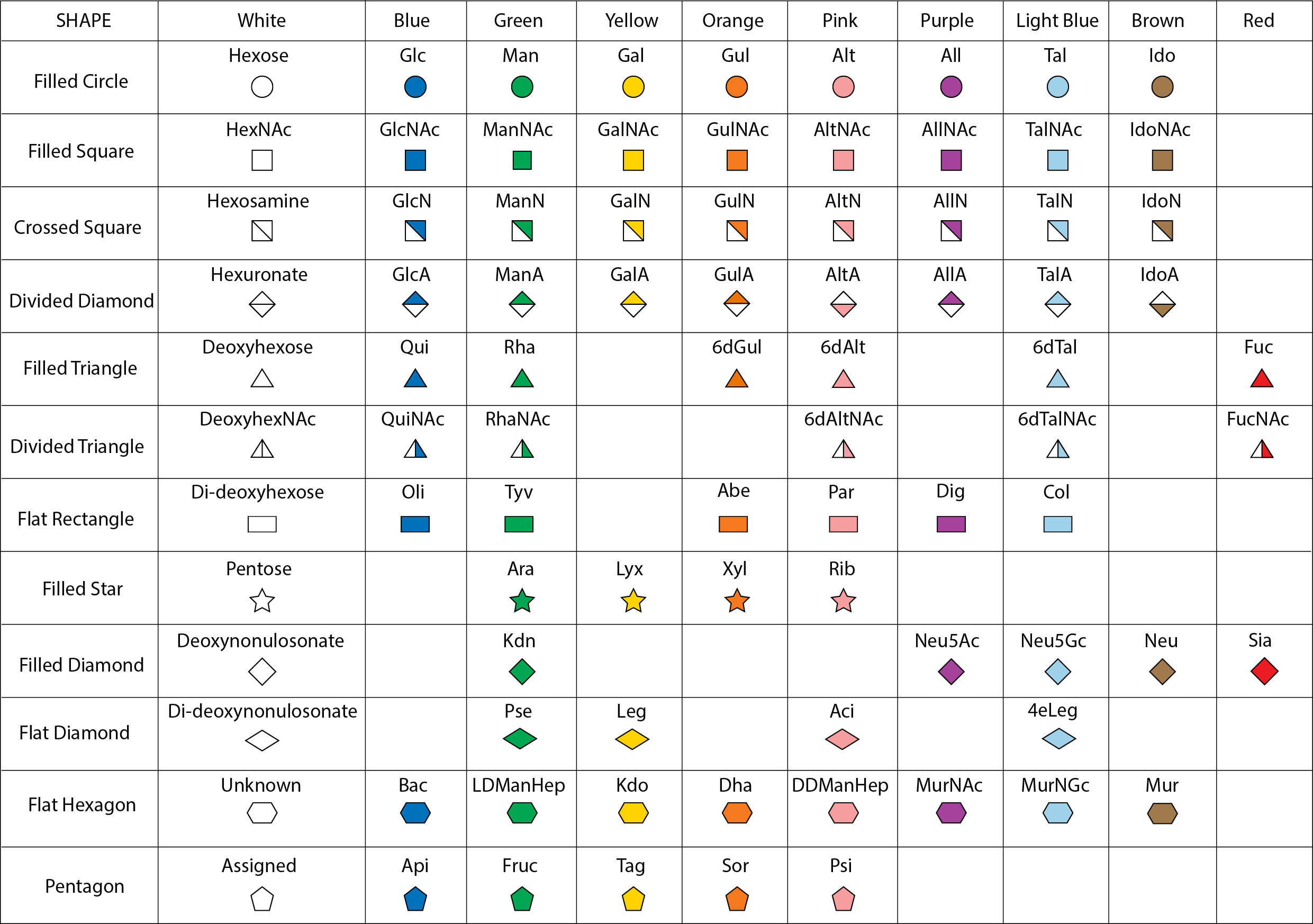
Monosaccharide color code in the SNFG

The Symbol Nomenclature For Glycans (SNFG) is a community-curated standard for the depiction of simple monosaccharides and complex carbohydrates (glycans) using various colored-coded, geometric shapes, along with defined text additions. It is hosted by the National Center for Biotechnology Information at the NCBI-Glycans Page. It is curated by an international groups of researchers in the field that are collectively called the SNFG Discussion Group. The overall goal of the SNFG is to:

1. Facilitate communications and presentations of monosaccharides and glycans for researchers in the Glycosciences, and for scientists and students less familiar with the field.
2. Ensure uniform usage of the nomenclature in the literature, thus helping to ensure scientific accuracy in journal and online publications.
3. Continue to develop the SNFG and its applications to aid wider use by the scientific community.

== Description and examples ==
The SNFG consists of a table that provides color coded symbols for various monosaccharides that are commonly found in nature. It also includes a set of footnotes that describe rules for rendering glycans, including guidelines on how to modify the base set of symbols depicted in the table. These footnotes are organized into 10 themes that provide streamlined recommendations for: i. general usage of the SNFG; ii. CMYK / RGB color codes; iii. symbol colors and shapes; iv. ring configurations; v. bond linkage presentation; vi. sialic acids; vii. glycan modifications; viii. amino substitutions; ix. handling ambiguous or partially defined glycans; and x. depicting non-glycan entities using SNFG renderings. More details are available at the main SNFG webpage, which is periodically updated with additional directions.

The monosaccharides can be linked together to describe complex carbohydrate structures or glycans. More exhaustive cases for mammalian species, other eukaryotes, plants and microbes are considered at the main SNFG page.

== Software ==
Several software tools have been developed to support SNFG implementation by the community including:

1. GlycoGlyph: An open source glycan drawing and naming tool which enables drawing glycans in SNFG format using either a graphical user interface or from names in CFG linear nomenclature format. When structures are drawn, the application produces both the CFG linear name and the GlycoCT which in turn can be used to get the GlyTouCan ID numbers for the glycan.
2. 3D-SNFG: For the cartoon representation of the SNFG in atomic models of carbohydrates. Here, the monosaccharides are depicted as large shapes, or icons centered within the rings.
3. DrawGlycan-SNFG: For the conversion of IUPAC-condensed string inputs to generate glycan and glycopeptide drawings. Bond fragmentation, glycan descriptors and other carbohydrate modifications can be included using string inputs.
4. GlycanBuilder2: A standalone version of GlycanBuilder that supports the expanded SNFG nomenclature.
5. Sugarsketcher: An intuitive web-based drag and drop tool for rendering SNFG images.

The SNFG nomenclature has also been adopted as a standard by major databases and journals in the Biomedical Sciences.

== History ==
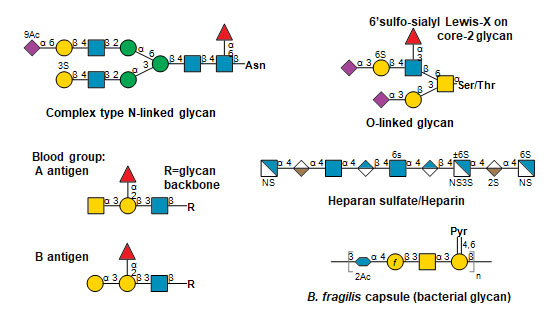
Selected examples of SNFG usage

In 1978, Stuart Kornfeld and colleagues at the Washington University School of Medicine presented a system for symbolic representation of vertebrate glycans. This system gained popularity when it was implemented as a core method for glycan representation in the NCBI text book Essentials of Glycobiology edited by Ajit Varki and colleagues at the University of California, San Diego and the UCSD School of Medicine. While the first edition of this text published in 1999 used black-and-white symbols similar to the Kornfeld system, color was introduced in the second edition of the text (2009). The advantage of color is that different monosaccharide stereoisomers could now be depicted using the same shape, only with different colors. The system of carbohydrate representation was adopted and widely disseminated by many including the NIGMS-funded Consortium for Functional Glycomics, and thus was often referred to as "CFG Nomenclature". This color representation was vastly expanded in the third edition of the text to include 49 new monosaccharides that appear mostly in non-vertebrates, microbes and plants. Inputs and recommendations from a number of scientists beyond the editors of the Essentials textbook was included in this implementation, and the release of the expanded glycan symbol system was coordinated with the IUPAC Carbohydrate Nomenclature committee. For long-term development of this symbol nomenclature and standardization of glycan representation in the Glycosciences, in 2015, the Essentials editors suggested that the representation be formally called SNFG ('Symbol Nomenclature For Glycans'), and future development be entrusted to a global community of scientists. To aid this development, each of the SNFG monosaccharide symbols was linked to PubChem entries at NCBI/NLM and a dedicated website at NCBI was established for future SNFG updates. Thus, the development of the SNFG is currently undertaken by an international community of scientist that are called the SNFG Discussion Group.
