= N-acetylneuraminate 7-O(or 9-O)-acetyltransferase =

Identifiers
- EC no.: 2.3.1.45
- CAS no.: 9054-50-6

Databases
- IntEnz: IntEnz view
- BRENDA: BRENDA entry
- ExPASy: NiceZyme view
- KEGG: KEGG entry
- MetaCyc: metabolic pathway
- PRIAM: profile
- PDB structures: RCSB PDB PDBe PDBsum
- Gene Ontology: AmiGO / QuickGO
Search
- PMC: articles
- PubMed: articles
- NCBI: proteins

In enzymology, a N-acetylneuraminate 7-O(or 9-O)-acetyltransferase (EC 2.3.1.45) is an enzyme that catalyzes the chemical reaction

acetyl-CoA + N-acetylneuraminate $\rightleftharpoons$ CoA + N-acetyl-7-O(or 9-O)-acetylneuraminate

Thus, the two substrates of this enzyme are acetyl-CoA and N-acetylneuraminate, whereas its 3 products are CoA, N-acetyl-7-O-acetylneuraminate, and N-acetyl-9-O-acetylneuraminate.

== Nomenclature ==
This enzyme belongs to the family of transferases, specifically those acyltransferases transferring groups other than aminoacyl groups. The systematic name of this enzyme class is acetyl-CoA:N-acetylneuraminate 7-O(or 9-O)-acetyltransferase. Other names in common use include N-acetylneuraminate 7(8)-O-acetyltransferase, sialate O-acetyltransferase, N-acetylneuraminate 7,8-O-acetyltransferase, acetyl-CoA:N-acetylneuraminate-7- or 8-O-acetyltransferase, acetyl-CoA:N-acetylneuraminate-7- and/or 8-O-acetyltransferase, glycoprotein 7(9)-O-acetyltransferase, acetyl-CoA:N-acetylneuraminate-9(7)-O-acetyltransferase, N-acetylneuraminate O7-(or O9-)acetyltransferase, and acetyl-CoA:N-acetylneuraminate-9(or 7)-O-acetyltransferase.
