= N-acetylneuraminate 4-O-acetyltransferase =

Identifiers
- EC no.: 2.3.1.44
- CAS no.: 51004-25-2

Databases
- IntEnz: IntEnz view
- BRENDA: BRENDA entry
- ExPASy: NiceZyme view
- KEGG: KEGG entry
- MetaCyc: metabolic pathway
- PRIAM: profile
- PDB structures: RCSB PDB PDBe PDBsum
- Gene Ontology: AmiGO / QuickGO
Search
- PMC: articles
- PubMed: articles
- NCBI: proteins

In enzymology, a N-acetylneuraminate 4-O-acetyltransferase (EC 2.3.1.44) is an enzyme that catalyzes the chemical reaction

acetyl-CoA + N-acetylneuraminate $\rightleftharpoons$ CoA + N-acetyl-4-O-acetylneuraminate

Thus, the two substrates of this enzyme are acetyl-CoA and N-acetylneuraminate, whereas its two products are CoA and N-acetyl-4-O-acetylneuraminate.

This enzyme belongs to the family of transferases, specifically those acyltransferases transferring groups other than aminoacyl groups. The systematic name of this enzyme class is acetyl-CoA:N-acetylneuraminate 4-O-acetyltransferase. This enzyme is also called sialate O-acetyltransferase.
