= Infantile free sialic acid storage disease =

- Other names: severe FSASD
- This condition is inherited via an autosomal recessive manner
- Specialty: Neurology, endocrinology
- Symptoms: hepatosplenomegaly; hypotonia; failure to thrive; developmental delays; cognitive deficits; seizures; skeletal abnormalities; dysplasia; metaphyses; clubbed feet; abnormally short thigh bones; nystagmus; ataxia.
- Duration: lifelong
- Causes: mutations in the SLC17A5 gene
- Diagnostic method: clinical evaluation and genetic testing
- Frequency: <1 per 1,000,000 individuals

Infantile free sialic acid storage disease (ISSD) is a lysosomal storage disease. ISSD occurs when sialic acid is unable to be transported out of the lysosomal membrane and instead accumulates in the tissue, causing free sialic acid to be excreted in the urine. Mutations in the SLC17A5 (solute carrier family 17 (anion/sugar transporter), member 50) gene cause all forms of sialic acid storage disease. The SLC17A5 gene is located on the long (q) arm of chromosome 6 between positions 14 and 15. This gene provides instructions for producing a protein called sialin that is located mainly on the membranes of lysosomes, compartments in the cell that digest and recycle materials.

ISSD is the most severe form of the sialic acid storage diseases.

== History ==
The mild form of the disease, Salla disease (also referred to as Finnish-type sialuria, OMIM#604369) was first reported as a lysosomal storage disorder in a family from northern Finland. Salla refers to the area where the affected family resided.

== Diagnosis ==
A diagnosis can be made by measuring cultured tissue samples for increased levels of free sialic acid. Prenatal testing is also available for known carriers of this disorder
