= Galactosamine =

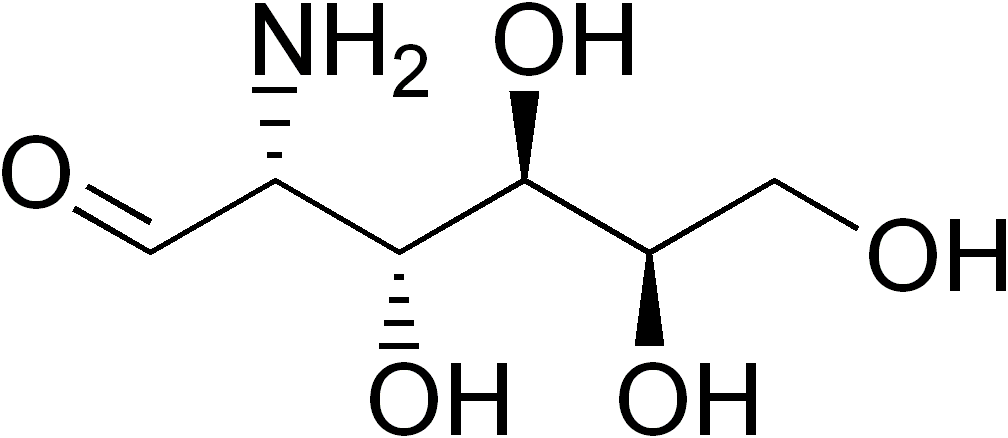

Names
- IUPAC name 2-Amino-2-deoxy-D-galactose
- Other names α-D-galactosamine

Identifiers
CAS Number	7535-00-4
3D model (JSmol)	Interactive image
ChEBI	CHEBI:60312
ChEMBL	ChEMBL207280
ChemSpider	22576
PubChem CID	24154
UNII	4Y6R29688W
- InChI: InChI=1S/C6H13NO5/c7-3-5(10)4(9)2(1-8)12-6(3)11/h2-6,8-11H,1,7H2/t2-,3-,4+,5-,6?/m1/s1 Key: MSWZFWKMSRAUBD-GASJEMHNSA-N; InChI=1/C6H13NO5/c7-3-5(10)4(9)2(1-8)12-6(3)11/h2-6,8-11H,1,7H2/t2-,3-,4+,5-,6?/m1/s1 Key: MSWZFWKMSRAUBD-GASJEMHNBA
- SMILES: O[C@H]1[C@@H](O)[C@H](OC(O)[C@@H]1N)CO

Properties
Chemical formula	C_{6}H_{13}NO_{5}
Molar mass	179.172 g·mol^{−1}
Melting point	180 °C (356 °F; 453 K) (HCl salt)
- Except where otherwise noted, data are given for materials in their standard state (at 25 °C [77 °F], 100 kPa). verify (what is ?) Infobox references

Galactosamine is a hexosamine derived from galactose with the molecular formula C_{6}H_{13}NO_{5}. This amino sugar is a constituent of some glycoprotein hormones such as follicle-stimulating hormone (FSH) and luteinizing hormone (LH).

Precursors such as uridine diphosphate (UDP), UDP-N-acetyl-D-glucosamine, or glucosamine are used to synthesize galactosamine in the human body. A derivative of this compound is N-acetyl-D-galactosamine.

Galactosamine is a hepatotoxic, or liver-damaging, agent that is sometimes used in animal models of liver failure.

== Hepatotoxicity ==
Galactosamine is used to induce hepatitis in rodent liver for research purposes. The result of using galactosamine to induce hepatitis is a disease model in which there is necrosis and inflammation of the liver. This type of tissue damage triggered by galactosamine resembles drug-induced liver disease in humans.

=== Mechanism of hepatotoxicity ===
The proposed mechanism behind galactosamine-induced hepatitis is depletion of the energy source of hepatocytes. In the Leloir pathway galactosamine is metabolized into galactosamine-1-phosphate (by galactokinase) and UDP-galactosamine (by UDP-galactose uridyltransferase). It is hypothesized that this leads to UDP-galactosamine accumulation within cells, and uridine triphosphate (UTP), UDP, and uridine monophosphate (UMP) decrease. The depletion of high-energy molecules such as UTP leads to a disruption in hepatocyte metabolism. Additionally, other derivatives of uridine such as UDP-glucose are depleted and this interferes with glycogen synthesis in the cell.

Another recent hypothesis states that overexpression of pro-inflammatory cytokines (such as tumor necrosis factor (TNFα) and NFκB-dependent inducible nitric oxide synthase (iNOS) over expression play a role in galactosamine-induced damage to liver cells.

== See also ==
- N-Acetylgalactosamine
- Uridine
