= Alpha-N-acetylgalactosaminide alpha-2,6-sialyltransferase =

Class of enzymes

alpha-N-acetylgalactosaminide alpha-2,6-sialyltransferase

Identifiers
- EC no.: 2.4.3.3
- CAS no.: 71124-50-0

Databases
- IntEnz: IntEnz view
- BRENDA: BRENDA entry
- ExPASy: NiceZyme view
- KEGG: KEGG entry
- MetaCyc: metabolic pathway
- PRIAM: profile
- PDB structures: RCSB PDB PDBe PDBsum
- Gene Ontology: AmiGO / QuickGO
Search
- PMC: articles
- PubMed: articles
- NCBI: proteins

In enzymology, an alpha-N-acetylgalactosaminide alpha-2,6-sialyltransferase (EC 2.4.3.3) is an enzyme that catalyzes the chemical reaction

CMP-N-acetylneuraminate + glycano-1,3-(N-acetyl-alpha-D-galactosaminyl)-glycoprotein $\rightleftharpoons$ CMP + glycano-(2,6-alpha-N-acetylneuraminyl)-(N-acetyl-D-galactosaminyl)- glycoprotein

Thus, the two substrates of this enzyme are CMP-N-acetylneuraminate and glycano-1,3-(N-acetyl-alpha-D-galactosaminyl)-glycoprotein, whereas its 3 products are CMP, glycano-(2,6-alpha-N-acetylneuraminyl)-(N-acetyl-D-galactosaminyl)-, and glycoprotein.

This enzyme belongs to the family of transferases, specifically those glycosyltransferases that do not transfer hexosyl or pentosyl groups. The systematic name of this enzyme class is CMP-N-acetylneuraminate:glycano-1,3-(N-acetyl-alpha-D-galactosaminyl)-glycoprotein alpha-2,6-N-acetylneuraminyltransferase. This enzyme participates in O-glycan biosynthesis and glycan structures - biosynthesis 1.

== See also ==
- N-acetylneuraminate, for CMP-N-acetylneuraminate and N-acetylneuraminyl
