= Mannosamine =

Names
- IUPAC name 2-Amino-2-deoxy-D-mannopyranose

Identifiers
CAS Number	2636-92-2
3D model (JSmol)	Interactive image
ChEBI	CHEBI:62325
ChemSpider	389060
MeSH	mannosamine
PubChem CID	440049
CompTox Dashboard (EPA)	DTXSID601316537
- InChI: InChI=1S/C6H13NO5/c7-3-5(10)4(9)2(1-8)12-6(3)11/h2-6,8-11H,1,7H2/t2-,3+,4-,5-,6?/m1/s1 Key: MSWZFWKMSRAUBD-CBPJZXOFSA-N; InChI=1/C6H13NO5/c7-3-5(10)4(9)2(1-8)12-6(3)11/h2-6,8-11H,1,7H2/t2-,3+,4-,5-,6?/m1/s1 Key: MSWZFWKMSRAUBD-CBPJZXOFBL
- SMILES: C([C@@H]1[C@H]([C@@H]([C@@H](C(O1)O)N)O)O)O

Properties
Chemical formula	C_{6}H_{13}NO_{5}
Molar mass	179.171 g/mol
- Except where otherwise noted, data are given for materials in their standard state (at 25 °C [77 °F], 100 kPa). verify (what is ?) Infobox references

D-Mannosamine (2-amino-2-deoxymannose) is a hexosamine derivative of mannose.

== See also ==
- Neuraminic acid
