= Sialuria =

- Specialty: Medical genetics

Sialuria is a group of disorders resulting in an accumulation of free sialic acid. One type, known as the Finnish type or Salla disease has been described in northeastern Finland and is due to a mutation in gene SLC17A5 on chromosome 6q4-15. The "French type sialuria" (Online Mendelian Inheritance in Man (OMIM): 269921), is a very rare condition presenting in infancy with failure to thrive, yellowish skin, large liver, low blood count, recurrent chest infections, bowel upsets, dehydration and characteristic facial features.
