= Hexosamines =

Class of chemical compounds

Chemical structure of α-D-glucosamine. Note amine group (NH_{2}).

Glucose. Note hydroxy group (OH) in place of the amine.

Hexosamines are amino sugars created by adding an amine group to a hexose.

Examples include:

- Fructosamine (based upon fructose)
- Galactosamine (based upon galactose)
- Glucosamine (based upon glucose)
- Mannosamine (based upon mannose)
