= N-Acetylmannosamine =

Names
- IUPAC name 2-(Acetylamino)-2-deoxy-β-D-mannopyranose

Identifiers
CAS Number	7772-94-3
3D model (JSmol)	Interactive image
ChEMBL	ChEMBL1231391
ChemSpider	9271300
ECHA InfoCard	100.127.007
PubChem CID	11096158
UNII	88J1ZMR63L
CompTox Dashboard (EPA)	DTXSID20884420
- InChI: InChI=1S/C8H15NO6/c1-3(11)9-5-7(13)6(12)4(2-10)15-8(5)14/h4-8,10,12-14H,2H2,1H3,(H,9,11)/t4-,5+,6-,7-,8-/m1/s1 Key: OVRNDRQMDRJTHS-OZRXBMAMSA-N; InChI=1/C8H15NO6/c1-3(11)9-5-7(13)6(12)4(2-10)15-8(5)14/h4-8,10,12-14H,2H2,1H3,(H,9,11)/t4-,5+,6-,7-,8-/m1/s1 Key: OVRNDRQMDRJTHS-OZRXBMAMBC
- SMILES: O[C@@H]1O[C@H](CO)[C@@H](O)[C@H](O)[C@@H]1NC(C)=O

Properties
Chemical formula	C_{8}H_{15}NO_{6}
Molar mass	221.21 g/mol
Melting point	118 to 121 °C (244 to 250 °F; 391 to 394 K)
- Except where otherwise noted, data are given for materials in their standard state (at 25 °C [77 °F], 100 kPa). verify (what is ?) Infobox references

N-Acetylmannosamine is a hexosamine monosaccharide. It is a neutral, stable naturally occurring compound. N-Acetylmannosamine is also known as N-Acetyl-D-mannosamine monohydrate, (which has the CAS Registry Number: 676347-48-1), N-Acetyl-D-mannosamine which can be abbreviated to ManNAc or, less commonly, NAM). ManNAc is the first committed biological precursor of N-acetylneuraminic acid (Neu5Ac, sialic acid) (Figure 1). Sialic acids are the negatively charged, terminal monosaccharides of carbohydrate chains that are attached to glycoproteins and glycolipids (glycans).

== Biological role of ManNAc ==
ManNAc is the first committed biological precursor of Neu5Ac.

The initiation of sialic acid biosynthesis occurs in the cytoplasm. The main substrate for this pathway is UDP-GlcNAc, which is derived from glucose. In the rate-limiting step of the pathway, UDP-GlcNAc is converted into ManNAc by UDP-GlcNAc 2-epimerase, encoded by the epimerase domain of GNE. ManNAc is phosphorylated by ManNAc kinase encoded by the kinase domain of GNE. Sialic acid becomes “activated” by CMP-sialic acid synthetase in the nucleus. CMP-sialic acid acts as a sialic acid donor to sialylate glycans on nascent glycoproteins and glycolipids in the Golgi apparatus; it also acts as a cytoplasmic feedback inhibitor of the UDP-GlcNAc 2-epimerase enzyme by binding to its allosteric site. The UDP-GlcNAc 2-epimerase kinase is the rate limiting step in sialic acid biosynthesis. If the enzyme does not work efficiently the organism cannot function correctly.

== Synthesis ==
There are several ways in which ManNAc can be synthesised and three examples follow.

1. By aldolase treatment of sialic acid. to produce ManNAc and pyruvic acid.
2. By base catalysed epimerization of N-acetyl glucosamine.
3. By rhodium (II)-catalyzed oxidative cyclization of glucal 3-carbamates.

ManNAc is now manufactured in large quantities by New Zealand Pharmaceuticals Ltd, in a commercial process from N-acetylglucosamine.

== Uses ==
=== Sialylation of recombinant proteins ===
There is normally some level of glycan sialylation within a glycoprotein, but with the observation that incomplete sialylation can lead to reduced therapeutic activity, it becomes relevant to assess the cell-lines and culture media to “humanise” the glycoprotein to improve performance and yield and reduce manufacturing costs. Keppler et al. demonstrated that the GNE enzyme was rate limiting in human hematopoietic cell lines and affected efficiency in cell surface sialylation. The activity of the GNE enzyme is now recognised as one of the defining features in the efficient production of sialylated recombinant glycoprotein therapeutic drugs. Improved sialylation after the addition of ManNAc and other supporting ingredients to the culture medium not only increases manufacturing yield, but also improves therapeutic efficacy by increasing solubility, increasing half-life and reducing immunogenicity by reducing the formation of antibodies to the therapeutic glycoprotein.

=== Therapeutic potential ===
When the GNE epimerase kinase does not function correctly in the human body thereby reducing the available ManNAc, it is reasonable to assume that treatment with ManNAc could assist with improving health benefits. The therapeutic potential for ManNAc is currently being assessed in several diseases in which therapy could benefit from its ability to enhance the biosynthesis of sialic acid.

=== GNE myopathy ===
The disease GNE myopathy [formerly known as hereditary Inclusion Body Myopathy (HIBM), and Distal Myopathy with Rimmed Vacuoles (DMRV)] is manifested as progressive muscle weakness. GNE myopathy is a rare genetic disorder caused by hyposialylated muscle proteins and glycosphingolipids because there is insufficient metabolic ManNAc to form the Neu5Ac terminal sugar. There is no available therapy to treat GNE myopathy.

=== Kidney diseases ===
There is a growing body of evidence that reduced activity of the GNE enzyme in the sialylation pathway in kidney tissue could contribute to several glomerular kidney diseases, due to the lack of the Neu5Ac terminal sugar on several kidney glycoproteins.

Three kidney diseases that affect both children and adults are minimal change disease (MCD), focal segmental glomerulosclerosis (FSGS) and membranous nephropathy (MN). These diseases are characterized by proteinuria (protein in the urine) and in the case of FSGS, a tendency to progressive scarring of the glomerulus (the filtering units of the kidneys) that leads to end-stage kidney disease. Several therapies are available for these diseases, but these therapies do not provide lasting reduction in proteinuria for many subjects and there can be severe side-effects.

There is now substantial pre-clinical evident correlating with human kidney biopsy samples, that some patients with MCD, FSGS or MN have kidney sialic acid insufficiency on their glomerular proteins. ManNAc therapy may increase sialic acid production and subsequently increase sialylation of glomerular proteins.
