= N-Acetylgalactosamine =

Chemical compound

Names
- IUPAC name 2-(Acetylamino)-2-deoxy-D-galactose
- Other names GalNAc; 2-Acetamido-2-deoxy-D-galactose; N-Acetylchondrosamine; 2-Acetamido-2-deoxy-D-galactopyranose; N-Acetyl-D-galactosamine

Identifiers
CAS Number	1811-31-0
3D model (JSmol)	Interactive image
ChEBI	CHEBI:40356
ChemSpider	76020
DrugBank	DB03567
KEGG	C01074
PubChem CID	84265
UNII	833755V695
CompTox Dashboard (EPA)	DTXSID70884733
- InChI: InChI=1S/C8H15NO6/c1-3(11)9-5-7(13)6(12)4(2-10)15-8(5)14/h4-8,10,12-14H,2H2,1H3,(H,9,11)/t4-,5-,6+,7-,8+/m1/s1 Key: OVRNDRQMDRJTHS-CBQIKETKSA-N; InChI=1/C8H15NO6/c1-3(11)9-5-7(13)6(12)4(2-10)15-8(5)14/h4-8,10,12-14H,2H2,1H3,(H,9,11)/t4-,5-,6+,7-,8+/m1/s1 Key: OVRNDRQMDRJTHS-CBQIKETKBW
- SMILES: O[C@@H](C(CO)O[C@H](O)[C@H]1NC(C)=O)[C@H]1O

Properties
Chemical formula	C_{8}H_{15}NO_{6}
Molar mass	221.21 g/mol
Melting point	172 to 173 °C (342 to 343 °F; 445 to 446 K)

Related compounds
Related monosaccharides	N-Acetylglucosamine; Galactosamine; Galactose
- Except where otherwise noted, data are given for materials in their standard state (at 25 °C [77 °F], 100 kPa). verify (what is ?) Infobox references

N-Acetylgalactosamine (GalNAc), is an amino sugar derivative of galactose.

== Function ==
In humans it is the terminal carbohydrate forming the antigen of blood group A.

It is typically the first monosaccharide that connects serine or threonine in particular forms of protein O-glycosylation.

N-Acetylgalactosamine is necessary for intercellular communication, and is concentrated in sensory nerve structures of both humans and animals.

GalNAc is also used as a targeting ligand in investigational antisense oligonucleotides and siRNA therapies targeted to the liver, where it binds to the asialoglycoprotein receptors on hepatocytes.

== See also ==
- Galactosamine
- Globoside
- (N-Acetylglucosamine) GlcNAc
