= Uridine diphosphate N-acetylglucosamine =

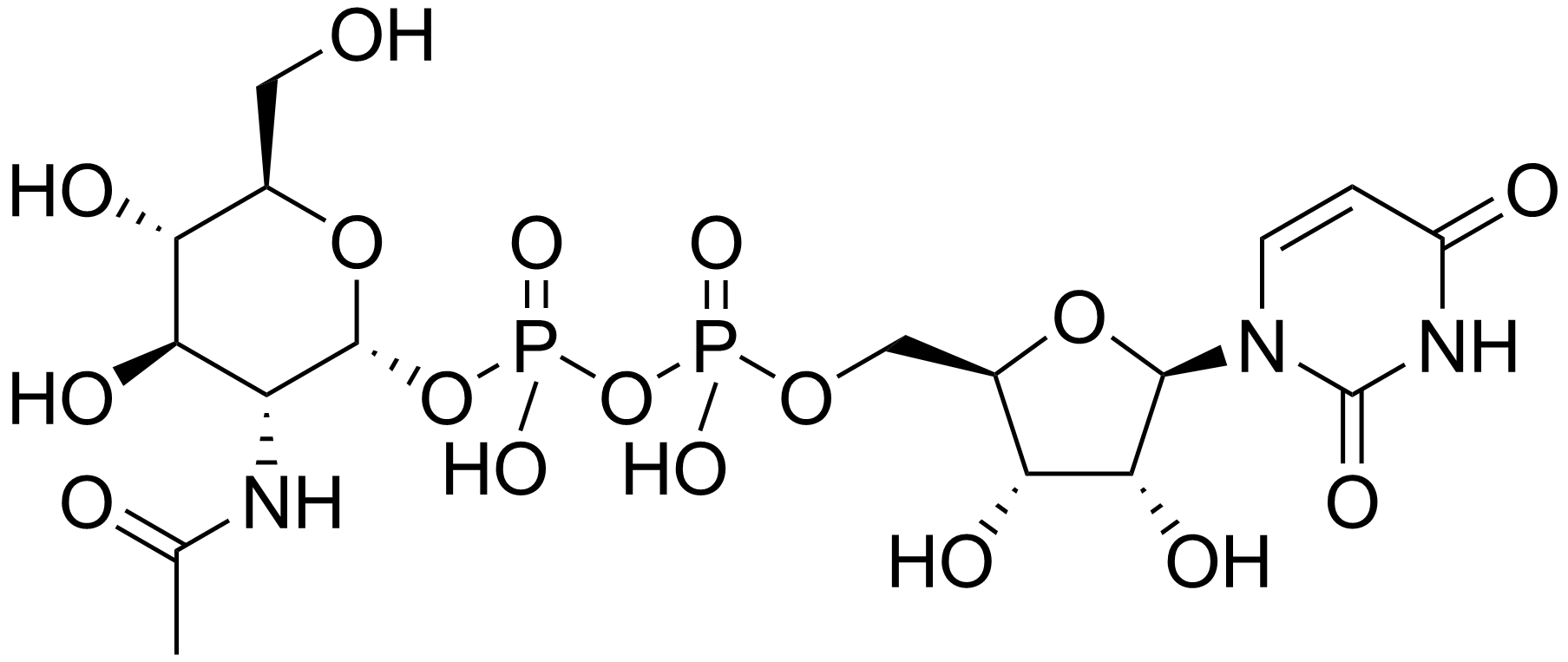

Names
- IUPAC name Uridine 5′-(2-acetamido-2-deoxy-α-D-glucopyranosyl dihydrogen diphosphate)
- Systematic IUPAC name O^{1}-[(2R,3R,4R,5S,6R)-3-Acetamido-4,5-dihydroxy-6-(hydroxymethyl)oxan-2-yl] O^{3}-{[(2R,3S,4R,5R)-5-(2,4-dioxo-3,4-dihydropyrimidin-1(2H)-yl)-3,4-dihydroxyoxolan-2-yl]methyl} dihydrogen diphosphate
- Other names UDP-N-acetylglucosamine; UDP-GlcNAc

Identifiers
CAS Number	91183-98-1
3D model (JSmol)	Interactive image
ChEBI	CHEBI:16264
ChemSpider	393240
DrugBank	DB03397
IUPHAR/BPS	1779
KEGG	C00043
PubChem CID	445675
CompTox Dashboard (EPA)	DTXSID10912327
- InChI: InChI=1S/C17H27N3O17P2/c1-6(22)18-10-13(26)11(24)7(4-21)35-16(10)36-39(31,32)37-38(29,30)33-5-8-12(25)14(27)15(34-8)20-3-2-9(23)19-17(20)28/h2-3,7-8,10-16,21,24-27H,4-5H2,1H3,(H,18,22)(H,29,30)(H,31,32)(H,19,23,28)/t7-,8-,10-,11-,12-,13-,14-,15-,16-/m1/s1 Key: LFTYTUAZOPRMMI-CFRASDGPSA-N
- SMILES: CC(=O)N[C@@H]1[C@H]([C@@H]([C@H](O[C@@H]1OP(=O)(O)OP(=O)(O)OC[C@@H]2[C@H]([C@H]([C@@H](O2)N3C=CC(=O)NC3=O)O)O)CO)O)O

Properties
Chemical formula	C_{17}H_{27}N_{3}O_{17}P_{2}
Molar mass	607.355 g·mol^{−1}
- Except where otherwise noted, data are given for materials in their standard state (at 25 °C [77 °F], 100 kPa). verify (what is ?) Infobox references

Uridine diphosphate N-acetylglucosamine or UDP-GlcNAc is a nucleotide sugar and a coenzyme in metabolism. It is used by glycosyltransferases to transfer N-acetylglucosamine residues to substrates. UDP-GlcNAc is used for making glycosaminoglycans, proteoglycans, and glycolipids. D-Glucosamine is made naturally in the form of glucosamine-6-phosphate, and is the biochemical precursor of all nitrogen-containing sugars. To be specific, glucosamine-6-phosphate is synthesized from fructose 6-phosphate and glutamine as the first step of the hexosamine biosynthesis pathway. The end-product of this pathway is UDP-GlcNAc. Some enzymes involved in the biosynthesis of UDP-GlcNAc vary between prokaryotic and eukaryotic organisms, serving as potential drug targets for antibiotic development.

== Biosignaling ==
UDP-GlcNAc is extensively involved in intracellular signaling as a substrate for O-linked N-acetylglucosamine transferases (OGTs) to install the O-GlcNAc post-translational modification in a wide range of species. It is also involved in nuclear pore formation and nuclear signalling. OGTs and OG-ases play an important role in the structure of the cytoskeleton. In mammals, there is enrichment of OGT transcripts in the pancreas beta-cells, and UDP-GlcNAc is thought to be part of the glucose sensing mechanism. There is also evidence that it plays a part in insulin sensitivity in other cells. In plants, it is involved in the control of gibberellin production. In eukaryotic stem cells, the presence of UDP-GlcNAc is essential for maintaining pluripotency, which is sustained through O-GlcNAcylation.

Clostridium novyi type A alpha-toxin is an O-linked N-actetylglucosamine transferase acting on Rho proteins and causing the collapse of the cytoskeleton.

There is a possible relationship between the inhibition of oxidative phosphorylation and reduced UDP-GlcNAc levels.

== Prokaryotic and eukaryotic biosynthesis ==
UDP-GlcNAc biosynthesis is not regulated by the same enzymes in prokaryotic and eukaryotic organisms. The lack of the bifunctional GlmU acetyltransferase and pyrophosphorylase in eukaryotes makes it a possible target for blocking UDP-GlcNAc synthesis (an essential precursor for peptidoglycan synthesis) in bacteria without affecting host cells.
