= N-Acetylneuraminic acid =

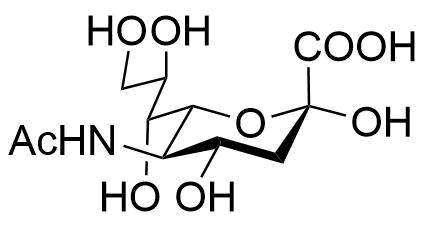
- α anomer

Names
- IUPAC name 5-(Acetylamino)-3,5-dideoxy-D-glycero-α-D-galacto-non-2-ulopyranosonic acid
- Other names: NANA; Neu5Ac; Aceneuramic acid; Acenobel

Identifiers
CAS Number	131-48-6
3D model (JSmol)	Interactive image
ChEBI	CHEBI:61599
ChemSpider	392681
ECHA InfoCard	100.004.568
KEGG	D11016
MeSH	N-Acetylneuraminic+Acid
PubChem CID	439197
UNII	GZP2782OP0
CompTox Dashboard (EPA)	DTXSID0050425
- InChI: InChI=1S/C11H19NO9/c1-4(14)12-7-5(15)2-11(20,10(18)19)21-9(7)8(17)6(16)3-13/h5-9,13,15-17,20H,2-3H2,1H3,(H,12,14)(H,18,19)/t5-,6+,7+,8+,9+,11+/m0/s1 Key: SQVRNKJHWKZAKO-YRMXFSIDSA-N; InChI=1/C11H19NO9/c1-4(14)12-7-5(15)2-11(20,10(18)19)21-9(7)8(17)6(16)3-13/h5-9,13,15-17,20H,2-3H2,1H3,(H,12,14)(H,18,19)/t5-,6+,7+,8+,9+,11+/m0/s1 Key: SQVRNKJHWKZAKO-YRMXFSIDBI
- SMILES: OC(=O)[C@@]1(O)C[C@H](O)[C@@H](NC(C)=O)[C@@H](O1)[C@H](O)[C@H](O)CO

Properties
Chemical formula	C_{11}H_{19}NO_{9}
Molar mass	309.271 g·mol^{−1}
Appearance	White crystalline powder
Melting point	186 °C (367 °F; 459 K) (decomposes)

Pharmacology
ATC code	M09AX05 (WHO)
- Except where otherwise noted, data are given for materials in their standard state (at 25 °C [77 °F], 100 kPa). verify (what is ?) Infobox references

N-Acetylneuraminic acid (Neu5Ac or NANA) is the predominant sialic acid found in human cells, and many mammalian cells. Other forms, such as N-Glycolylneuraminic acid, may also occur in cells.

This residue is negatively charged at physiological pH and is found in complex glycans on mucins and glycoproteins found at the cell membrane. Neu5Ac residues are also found in glycolipids, known as gangliosides, a crucial component of neuronal membranes found in the brain.

Along with involvement in preventing infections (mucus associated with mucous membranes—mouth, nose, GI, respiratory tract), Neu5Ac acts as a receptor for influenza viruses, allowing attachment to mucous cells via hemagglutinin (an early step in acquiring influenzavirus infection).

== In the biology of bacterial pathogens ==
Neu5Ac is also important in the biology of a number of pathogenic and symbiotic bacteria as it can be used either as a nutrient, providing both carbon and nitrogen to the bacteria, or in some pathogens, can be activated and placed on the cell surface. Bacteria have evolved transporters for Neu5Ac to enable them to capture it from their environment and a number of these have been characterized including the NanT protein from Escherichia coli, the SiaPQM TRAP transporter from Haemophilus influenzae and the SatABCD ABC transporter from Haemophilus ducreyi.

== Medical use ==
In Japan, Neu5Ac is approved under the trade name Acenobel for the treatment of distal myopathy with rimmed vacuoles.

== See also ==
- Neuraminic acid
- N-Glycolylneuraminic acid
- Sialic acid
