= Sialic acid =

Class of keto acid sugars

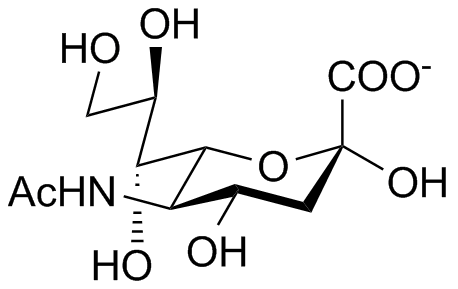
- N-Acetylneuraminic acid, the most common of the sialic acids

Sialic acids are a class of alpha-keto acid sugars with a nine-carbon backbone. The term "sialic acid" (from Greek σίαλον (síalon) 'saliva') was first introduced by Swedish biochemist Gunnar Blix in 1952. The most common member of this group is N-acetylneuraminic acid (Neu5Ac or NANA) found in animals and some prokaryotes.

Sialic acids are found widely distributed in animal tissues and related forms are found to a lesser extent in other organisms like in some micro-algae, bacteria and archaea. Sialic acids are commonly part of glycoproteins, glycolipids or gangliosides, where they decorate the end of sugar chains at the surface of cells or soluble proteins. However, sialic acids have been also observed in Drosophila embryos and other insects. Generally, plants seem not to contain or display sialic acids.

In humans, the brain has the highest sialic acid content, where these acids play an important role in neural transmission and ganglioside structure in synaptogenesis. More than 50 kinds of sialic acid are known, all of which can be obtained from a molecule of neuraminic acid by substituting its amino group or one of its hydroxyl groups. In general, the amino group bears either an acetyl or a glycolyl group, but other modifications have been described. These modifications along with linkages have shown to be tissue specific and developmentally regulated expressions, so some of them are only found on certain types of glycoconjugates in specific cells. The hydroxyl substituents may vary considerably; acetyl, lactyl, methyl, sulfate, and phosphate groups have been found.

Neuraminic acid (Neu), the N- or O-substituted derivatives of which form most sialic acids

== Structure ==
The sialic acid family includes many derivatives of the nine-carbon sugar neuraminic acid, but these acids rarely appear free in nature. Normally they can be found as components of oligosaccharide chains of mucins, glycoproteins and glycolipids occupying terminal, nonreducing positions of complex carbohydrates on both external and internal membrane areas where they are very exposed and develop important functions.

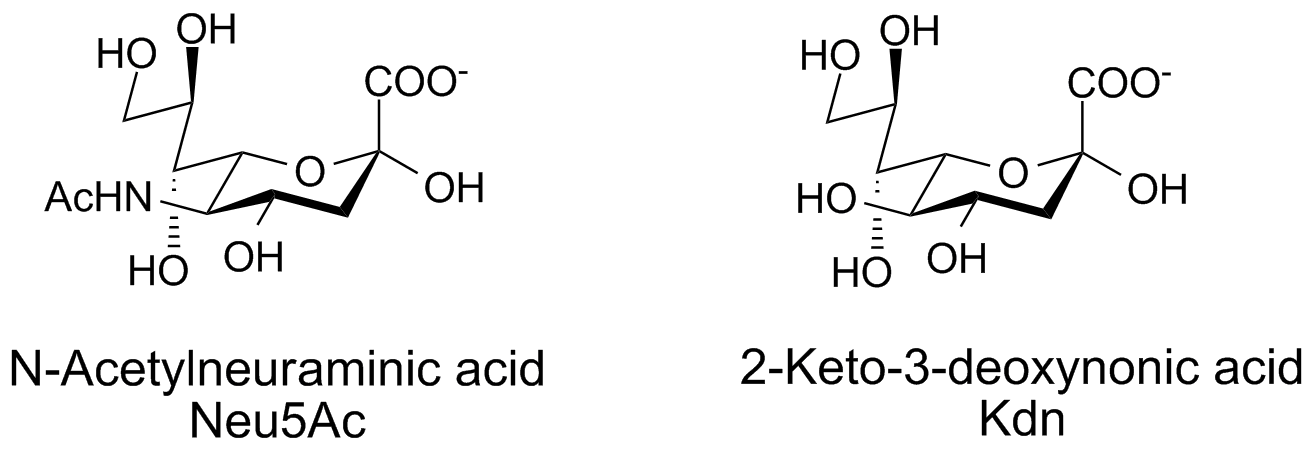

The numbering of the carbon atoms starts at the carboxylate carbon and continues along the chain. The configuration that places the carboxylate in the axial position is the alpha-anomer.

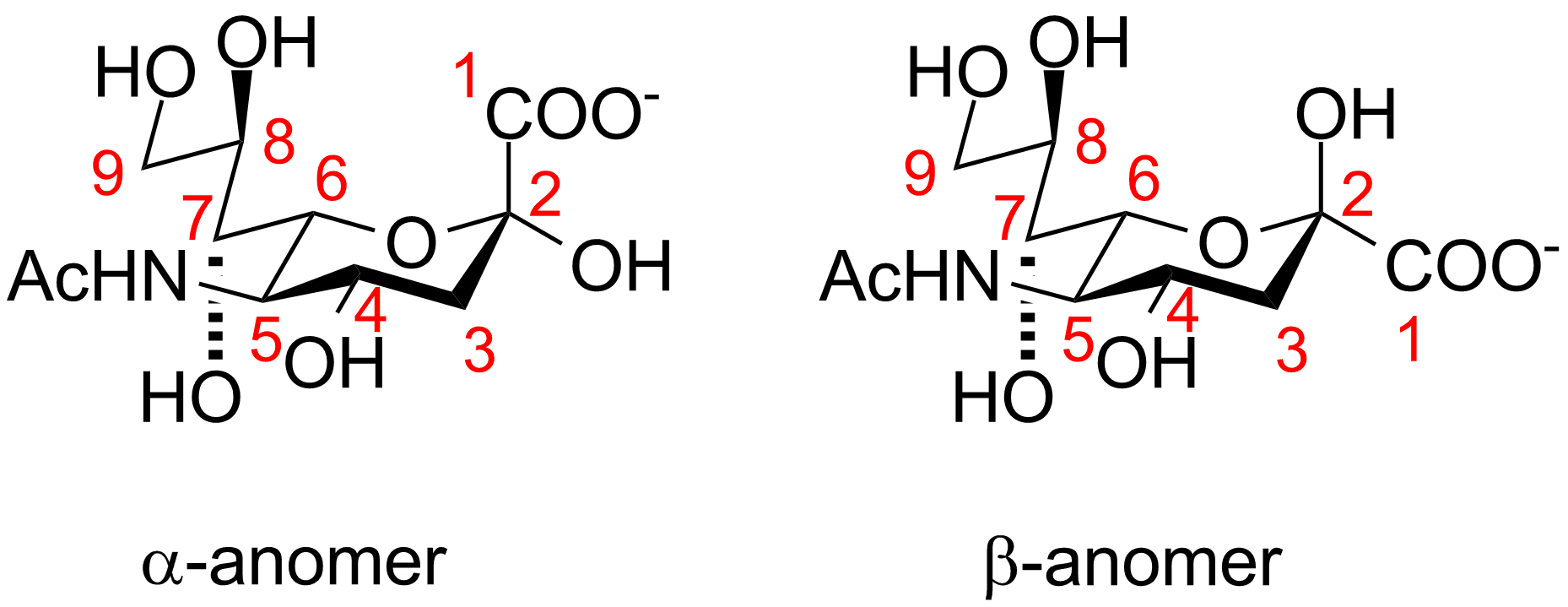

The alpha-anomer is the form that is found when sialic acid is bound to glycans. However, in solution, it is mainly (over 90%) in the beta-anomeric form. A bacterial enzyme with sialic acid mutarotase activity, NanM, that is able to rapidly equilibrate solutions of sialic acid to the resting equilibrium position of around 90% beta/10% alpha has been discovered.

In contrast to other animals, humans are genetically unable to produce the sialic acid variant N-glycolylneuraminic acid (Neu5Gc). Small amounts of Neu5Gc detected in human tissue however may be incorporated from exogenous (nutrient) sources.

== Biosynthesis ==
Sialic acid is synthesized by glucosamine 6 phosphate and acetyl-CoA through a transferase, resulting in N-acetylglucosamine-6-P. This becomes N-acetylmannosamine-6-P through epimerization, which reacts with phosphoenolpyruvate producing N-acetylneuraminic-9-P (sialic acid). For it to become active to enter in the oligosaccharide biosynthesis process of the cell, a monophosphate nucleoside is added, which comes from a cytidine triphosphate, turning sialic acid into cytidine monophosphate-sialic acid (CMP-sialic acid). This compound is synthesized in the nucleus of the animal cell.

In bacterial systems, sialic acids can be also biosynthesized by an aldolase. This enzyme uses for example a mannose derivative as a substrate, inserting three carbons from pyruvate into the resulting sialic acid structure. These enzymes can be used for chemoenzymatic synthesis of sialic acid derivatives.

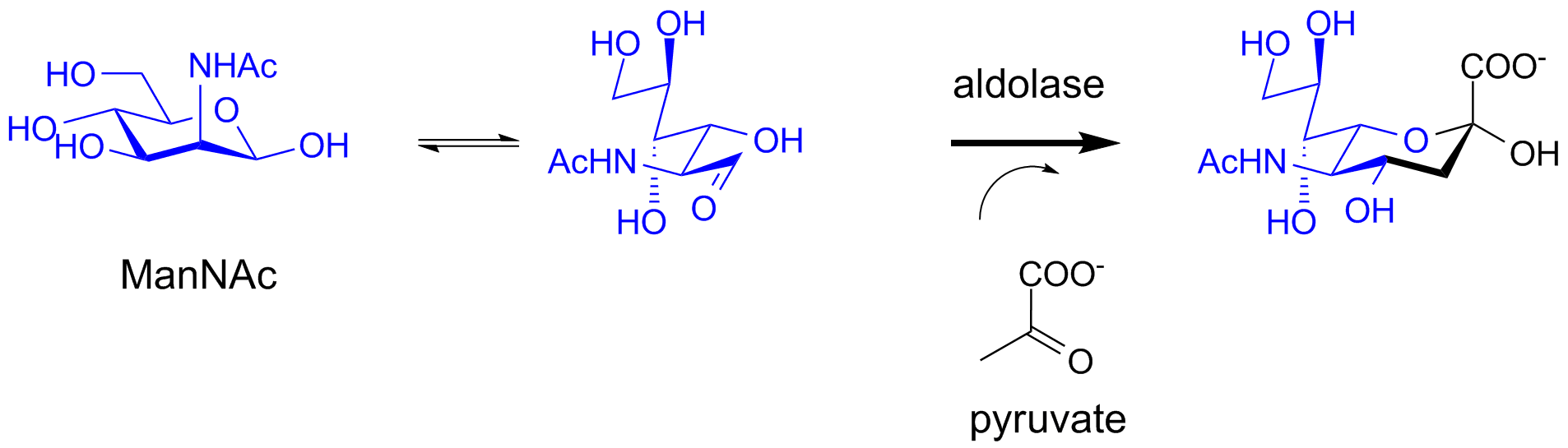

== Function ==
Glycoproteins containing sialic acid (sialoglycoproteins) bind selectin in humans and other organisms. Metastatic cancer cells often express a high density of sialic acid-rich glycoproteins. This overexpression of sialic acid on surfaces creates a negative charge on cell membranes. This creates repulsion between cells (cell opposition) and helps these late-stage cancer cells enter the blood stream. Recent experiments have demonstrated the presence of sialic acid in the cancer-secreted extracellular matrix.

Sialic acid-rich oligosaccharides on the glycoconjugates (glycolipids, glycoproteins, proteoglycans) found on surface membranes help keep water at the surface of cells. The sialic acid-rich regions contribute to creating a negative charge on the cells' surfaces. Since water is a polar molecule with partial positive charges on both hydrogen atoms, it is attracted to cell surfaces and membranes. This also contributes to cellular fluid uptake.

Sialic acid residues are present in the mucin glycoproteins of mucus.

Sialic acid can "hide" mannose antigens on the surface of host cells or bacteria from mannose-binding lectin. This prevents activation of complement.

Sialic acid in the form of polysialic acid is an unusual posttranslational modification that occurs on the neural cell adhesion molecules (NCAMs). In the synapse, the strong negative charge of the polysialic acid prevents NCAM cross-linking of cells.

== Immunity ==
Sialic acids are found at all cell surfaces of vertebrates and some invertebrates, and also at certain bacteria that interact with vertebrates.

Many viruses such as the Ad26 serotype of adenoviruses (Adenoviridae), rotaviruses (Reoviridae) and influenza viruses (Orthomyxoviridae) can use host-sialylated structures for binding to their target host cell. Sialic acids provide a good target for these viruses since they are highly conserved and are abundant in large numbers in virtually all cells. Unsurprisingly, sialic acids also play an important role in several human viral infections. The influenza viruses have hemagglutinin activity (HA) glycoproteins on their surfaces that bind to sialic acids found on the surface of human erythrocytes and on the cell membranes of the upper respiratory tract. This is the basis of hemagglutination when viruses are mixed with blood cells, and entry of the virus into cells of the upper respiratory tract. Widely used anti-influenza drugs (oseltamivir and zanamivir) are sialic acid analogs that interfere with release of newly generated viruses from infected cells by inhibiting the viral enzyme neuraminidase.

Some bacteria also use host-sialylated structures for binding and recognition. For example, evidence indicates that free sialic acids can behave as a signal to some specific bacteria, like Pneumococcus. Free sialic acid possibly can help the bacterium to recognize that it has reached a vertebrate environment suitable for its colonization. Modifications of Sias, such as the N-glycolyl group at the 5 position or O-acetyl groups on the side chain, may reduce the action of bacterial sialidases.

== Metabolism ==
The synthesis and degradation of sialic acid are distributed in different compartments of the cell. The synthesis starts in the cytosol, where N-acetylmannosamine 6 phosphate and phosphoenolpyruvate give rise to sialic acid. Later on, Neu5Ac 9 phosphate is activated in the nucleus by a cytidine monophosphate (CMP) residue through CMP-Neu5Ac synthase. Although the linkage between sialic acid and other compounds tends to be a α binding, this specific one is the only one that is a β linkage. CMP-Neu5Ac is then transported to the endoplasmic reticulum or the Golgi apparatus, where it can be transferred to an oligosaccharide chain, becoming a new glycoconjugate. This bond can be modified by O-acetylation or O-methylation. When the glycoconjugate is mature it is transported to the cell surface.

The sialidase is one of the most important enzymes of the sialic acid catabolism. It can cause the removal of sialic acid residues from the cell surface or serum sialoglycoconjugates. Usually, in higher animals, the glycoconjugates that are prone to be degraded are captured by endocytosis. After the fusion of the late endosome with the lysosome, lysosomal sialidases remove sialic acid residues. The activity of these sialidases is based on the removal of O-acetyl groups. Free sialic acid molecules are transported to the cytosol through the membrane of the lysosome. There, they can be recycled and activated again to form another nascent glycoconjugate molecule in the Golgi apparatus. Sialic acids can also be degraded to acylmannosamine and pyruvate with the cytosolic enzyme acylneuraminate lyase.

Some severe diseases can depend on the presence or absence of some enzymes related to the sialic acid metabolism. Sialidosis and Sialic acid deficiency with mutations in the NANS gene (see below) would be examples of this type of disorder.

== Brain development ==
Rat pups supplemented with sialic acid showed improved learning and memory as adults. A relationship between dietary sialic acid supplementation and cognitive function was seen in piglets that had been fed high doses of sialic acid.

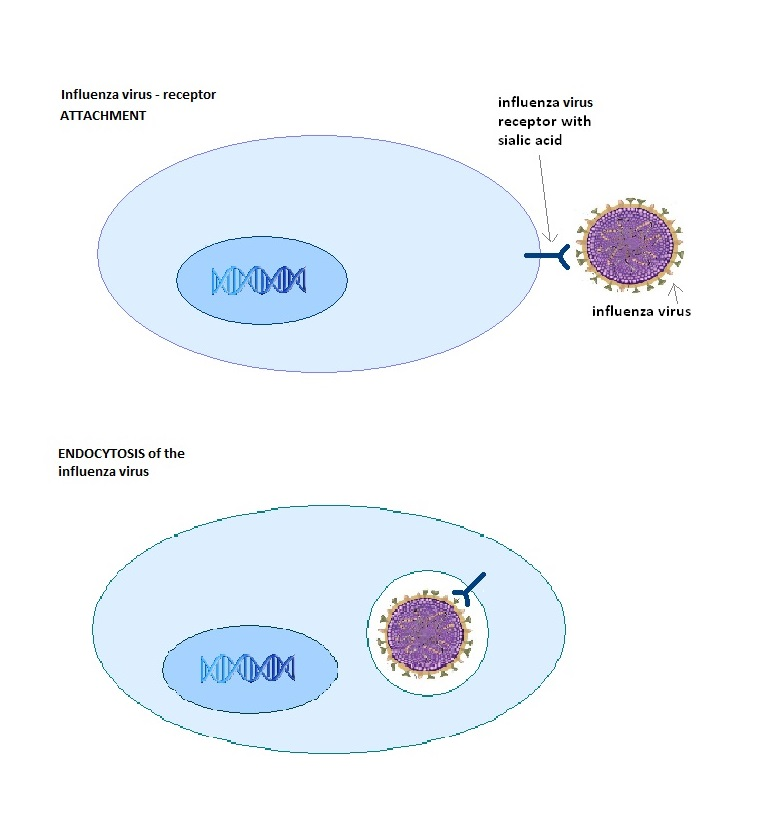
How the influenza virus gets into the cell by endocytosis

== Diseases ==
Sialic acids are related to several different diseases observed in humans.

=== Sialic acid deficiency with mutations in the NANS gene ===
Biallelic recessive mutations in the sialic acid synthesis gene, N-acetyl-neuraminic acid synthase (NANS) in humans may result in a severe disease featuring intellectual disability and short stature, highlighting the importance of sialic acid in brain development. A therapeutic trial with a short-term supplementation of sialic acid given orally has failed to show a significant beneficial effect on biochemical parameters.

=== Salla disease ===
Salla disease is an extremely rare illness which is considered the mildest form of the free sialic acid accumulation disorders though its childhood form is considered an aggressive variant and people who suffer from it have intellectual disability. It is an autosomic recessive disorder caused by a mutation of the chromosome 6. It mainly affects the nervous system and it is caused by a lysosomal storage irregularity which comes from a deficit of a specific sialic acid carrier located on the lysosomal membrane Currently, there is no cure for this disease and the treatment is supportive, focusing on the control of symptoms.

=== Atherosclerosis ===
Subfractions of LDL cholesterol that are implicated in causing atherosclerosis have reduced levels of sialic acid. These include small high density LDL particles and electronegative LDL. Reduced levels of sialic acid in small high density LDL particles increases the affinity of those particles for the proteoglycans in arterial walls.

=== Influenza ===
All influenza A virus strains need sialic acid to connect with cells. There are different forms of sialic acids which have different affinity with influenza A virus variety. This diversity is an important fact that determines which species can be infected. When a certain influenza A virus is recognized by a sialic acid receptor the cell tends to endocytose the virus so the cell becomes infected.

== Sialic acids and other nonulosonic acids (NulOs) in prokaryotes ==
Sialic acids are highly abundant in vertebrate tissues where they are involved in many different biological processes. Originally discovered within the deuterostome lineage of animals, sialic acids can be actually considered as a subset of a more ancient family of 9-carbon backbone monosaccharides called nonulosonic acids (NulOs), which more recently have been also found in Eubacteria and Archaea. Many pathogenic bacteria incorporate sialic acid into cell surface features like their lipopolysaccharide or capsule polysaccharides, which helps them to evade the innate immune response of the host. A recent genome level study examined a large set of sequenced microbial genomes, which indicated that biosynthetic pathways to produce nonulosonic acids (NulOs) are far more widely distributed across the phylogenetic tree of life, than previously realized. This finding is moreover supported by recent lectin staining studies and a molecular level survey on prokaryotic nonulosonic acids, showing that also many non-pathogenic and purely environmental strains produce bacterial sialic acids (NulOs). Some (anammox) bacteria produce NulOs that in addition to the very acidic alpha-keto acid group also display (neutralizing) basic groups (free amines). Comparable cell surface sialic acids have been produced by chemical remodelling to manipulate the cell surface charge by producing a free amine at C5, which neutralizes the negatively charged carboxyl group at C1.

== See also ==
- Sialidosis
- Sialoglycoprotein
- Sialyltransferase
- Siglec
- Orthomyxoviridae
