= Galactosyltransferase =

Class of enzymes

Identifiers
- Symbol: Galactosyl_T
- Pfam: PF01762
- InterPro: IPR002659
Available protein structures:
- Pfam: structures / ECOD
- PDB: RCSB PDB; PDBe; PDBj
- PDBsum: structure summary

galactose

Galactosyltransferase is a type of glycosyltransferase which catalyzes the transfer of galactose. An example is B-N-acetylglucosaminyl-glycopeptide b-1,4-galactosyltransferase.

The biosynthesis of disaccharides, oligosaccharides and polysaccharides involves the action of hundreds of different glycosyltransferases. These enzymes catalyse the transfer of sugar moieties from activated donor molecules to specific acceptor molecules, forming glycosidic bonds. A classification of glycosyltransferases using nucleotide diphospho-sugar, nucleotide monophospho-sugar and sugar phosphates (EC 2.4.1.-) and related proteins into distinct sequence based families has been described. This classification is available on the CAZy (Carbohydrate-Active EnZymes) web site. The same three-dimensional fold is expected to occur within each of the families. Because 3-D structures are better conserved than sequences, several of the families defined on the basis of sequence similarities may have similar 3-D structures and therefore form 'clans'.

Glycosyltransferase family 31 (CAZY GH_31) comprises enzymes with a number of known activities; N-acetyllactosaminide beta-1,3-N-acetylglucosaminyltransferase (EC 2.4.1.149); beta-1,3-galactosyltransferase (EC 2.4.1); fucose-specific beta-1,3-N-acetylglucosaminyltransferase (EC 2.4.1); globotriosylceramide beta-1,3-GalNAc transferase (EC 2.4.1.79).

== Human galactosyltransferases ==
B3GALNT1; B3GALNT2; B3GALT1; B3GALT2; B3GALT4; B3GALT5; B3GALT6; B3GNT2; B3GNT3; B3GNT4; B3GNT5; B3GNT6; B3GNT7; B3GNT8;

B4GALNT1; B4GALNT2; B4GALNT3; B4GALNT4;

B4GALT1; B4GALT2; B4GALT3; B4GALT4; B4GALT5; B4GALT6; B4GALT7;

GALNT1; GALNT2; GALNT3; GALNT4; GALNT5; GALNT6; GALNT7; GALNT8; GALNT9; GALNT10; GALNT11; GALNT12; GALNT13; GALNT14;

GALNTL1; GALNTL2; GALNTL4; GALNTL5; GALNTL6;
