= B4GALT2 =

Protein-coding gene in humans

Identifiers
- Aliases: B4GALT2, B4Gal-T2, B4Gal-T3, beta4Gal-T2, beta-1,4-galactosyltransferase 2
- External IDs: OMIM: 604013; MGI: 1858493; GeneCards: B4GALT2
Enzyme activity
EC #	BRENDA	ExPASy	KEGG	MetaCyc
2.4.1.22	↗	↗	↗	↗
2.4.1.38	↗	↗	↗	↗
2.4.1.90	↗	↗	↗	↗

Gene location (Human)
Chr.	Chromosome 1 (human)
Band	1p34.1	Start	43,978,943 bp
Band	1p34.1	End	43,991,170 bp

Gene location (Mouse)
Chr.	Chromosome 4 (mouse)
Band	4|4 D1	Start	117,726,457 bp
Band	4|4 D1	End	117,740,684 bp
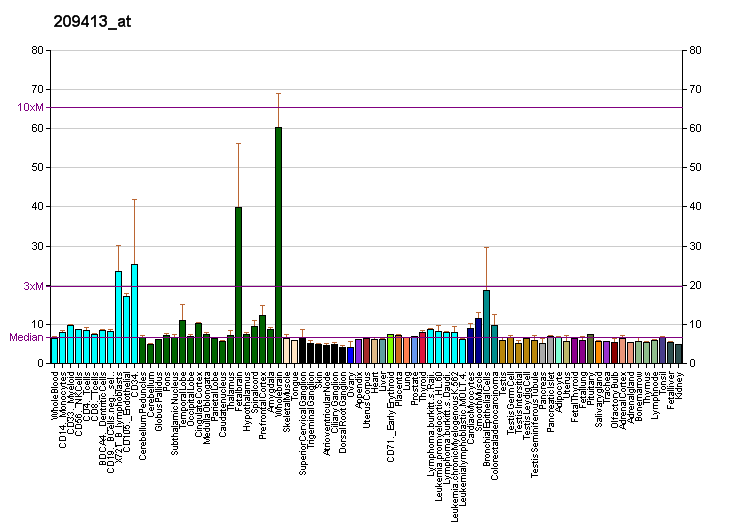
RNA expression pattern
Bgee	Human / Mouse (ortholog); Top expressed in: Brodmann area 10; amygdala; cingulate gyrus; anterior cingulate cortex; stromal cell of endometrium; right frontal lobe; apex of heart; ganglionic eminence; muscle of thigh; gastrocnemius muscle / Top expressed in: perirhinal cortex; entorhinal cortex; superior frontal gyrus; primary visual cortex; ventricular zone; neural layer of retina; dentate gyrus of hippocampal formation granule cell; ovarian follicle; yolk sac; CA3 field; More reference expression data
BioGPS	More reference expression data
Gene ontology
Molecular function	transferase activity; N-acetyllactosamine synthase activity; galactosyltransferase activity; lactose synthase activity; metal ion binding; glycosyltransferase activity; beta-N-acetylglucosaminylglycopeptide beta-1,4-galactosyltransferase activity
Cellular component	integral component of membrane; Golgi cisterna membrane; Golgi membrane; membrane; nucleoplasm; Golgi apparatus; intracellular membrane-bounded organelle
Biological process	protein glycosylation; keratan sulfate biosynthetic process; memory; locomotory behavior; visual learning; cerebellar Purkinje cell layer development; brain development; carbohydrate metabolic process
Sources:Amigo / QuickGO
Orthologs
Databases	NCBI: entry; OMA: entry
Species	Human	Mouse
Entrez	8704	53418
Ensembl	ENSG00000117411	ENSMUSG00000028541
UniProt	O60909	Q9Z2Y2
RefSeq (mRNA)	NM_030587; NM_001005417; NM_003780	NM_001253381; NM_017377
RefSeq (protein)	NP_001005417; NP_003771; NP_085076	NP_001240310; NP_059073
Location (UCSC)	Chr 1: 43.98 – 43.99 Mb	Chr 4: 117.73 – 117.74 Mb
PubMed search
- Wikidata
View/Edit Human	View/Edit Mouse

Beta-1,4-galactosyltransferase 2 is an enzyme that in humans is encoded by the B4GALT2 gene.

This gene is one of seven beta-1,4-galactosyltransferase (beta4GalT) genes. They encode type II membrane-bound glycoproteins that appear to have exclusive specificity for the donor substrate UDP-galactose; all transfer galactose in a beta1,4 linkage to similar acceptor sugars: GlcNAc, Glc, and Xyl. Each beta4GalT has a distinct function in the biosynthesis of different glycoconjugates and saccharide structures. As type II membrane proteins, they have an N-terminal hydrophobic signal sequence that directs the protein to the Golgi apparatus and which then remains uncleaved to function as a transmembrane anchor. By sequence similarity, the beta4GalTs form four groups: beta4GalT1 and beta4GalT2, beta4GalT3 and beta4GalT4, beta4GalT5 and beta4GalT6, and beta4GalT7. The enzyme encoded by this gene synthesizes N-acetyllactosamine in glycolipids and glycoproteins. Its substrate specificity is affected by alpha-lactalbumin but it is not expressed in lactating mammary tissue. Two transcript variants encoding the same protein have been found for this gene.
