= Lactose synthase =

Enzyme that generates lactose

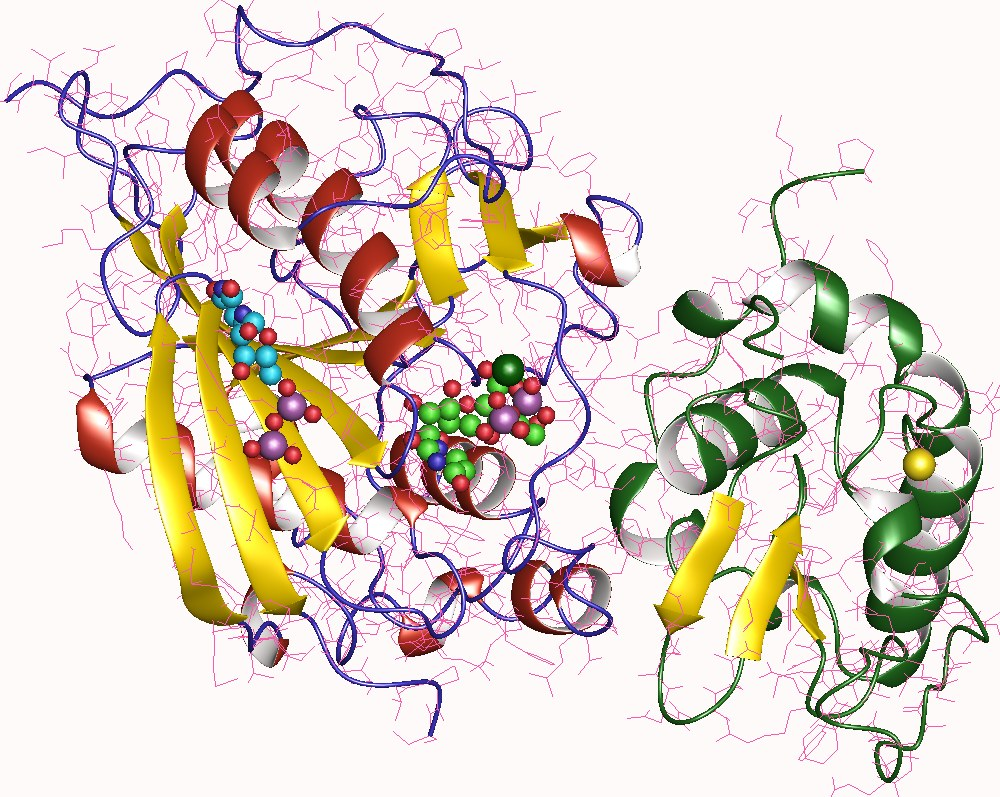
- Lactose synthase monomer, Bos taurus + alpha-lactalbumin (mouse)

Identifiers
- EC no.: 2.4.1.22
- CAS no.: 2604493

Databases
- IntEnz: IntEnz view
- BRENDA: BRENDA entry
- ExPASy: NiceZyme view
- KEGG: KEGG entry
- MetaCyc: metabolic pathway
- PRIAM: profile
- PDB structures: RCSB PDB PDBe PDBsum
Search
- PMC: articles
- PubMed: articles
- NCBI: proteins

Lactose synthase (EC 2.4.1.22) is an enzyme that generates lactose from glucose and UDP-galactose.

D-glucose
+ UDP-galactose
UDP
lactose

It consists of two protein components, with N-acetyllactosamine synthase being regulated by alpha-lactalbumin. The synthase enzyme normally functions to convert N-acetyl-D-glucosamine to N-acetyllactosamine by transferring a galactose group from UDP-galactose:

N-acetyl-D-glucosamine
+ UDP-galactose
UDP
N-acetyllactosamine

α-Lactalbumin, which is expressed in response to prolactin, increases the affinity of N-acetyllactosamine synthase for its substrate, causing increased production of lactose during lactation. The interaction increases by 1000-fold the affinity for glucose.

N-acetyllactosamine synthase is a beta-1,4-galactosyltransferase, a type-II membrane protein found in the Golgi. α-Lactalbumin is a calcium-ion binding protein specific to mammary glands. The beta-1,4-galactosyltransferase catalytic component consists of two flexible loops: small loop and large loop. The small loop consists of a Trp residue (Trp314) with surrounding glycine residues, meanwhile the large loop makes up amino acid residues 345 to 365. The Trp residue in the small loop moves allowing for the sugar nucleotide to be locked into the binding site. This causes a conformational change in the large loop which then creates sites for oligosaccharide and metal ion binding, and protein-protein interactions for alpha-lactalbumin. It is important to maintain a sequential order for these binding events to occur, meaning the conformational change needs to occur after the binding of the substrate. If the conformational change is induced before the binding of the substrate, the substrate cannot bind since the large loop would hide the substrate binding sites after undergoing a conformational change. In such a case, the enzyme would be nonfunctional.
