= B4GALT3 =

Protein-coding gene in humans

Identifiers
- Aliases: B4GALT3, beta4Gal-T3, beta-1,4-galactosyltransferase 3
- External IDs: OMIM: 604014; MGI: 1928767; GeneCards: B4GALT3
Enzyme activity
EC #	BRENDA	ExPASy	KEGG	MetaCyc
2.4.1.38	↗	↗	↗	↗
2.4.1.90	↗	↗	↗	↗
2.4.1.275	↗	↗	↗	↗

Gene location (Human)
Chr.	Chromosome 1 (human)
Band	1q23.3	Start	161,171,310 bp
Band	1q23.3	End	161,177,968 bp

Gene location (Mouse)
Chr.	Chromosome 1 (mouse)
Band	1 H3|1 79.29 cM	Start	171,097,898 bp
Band	1 H3|1 79.29 cM	End	171,104,469 bp
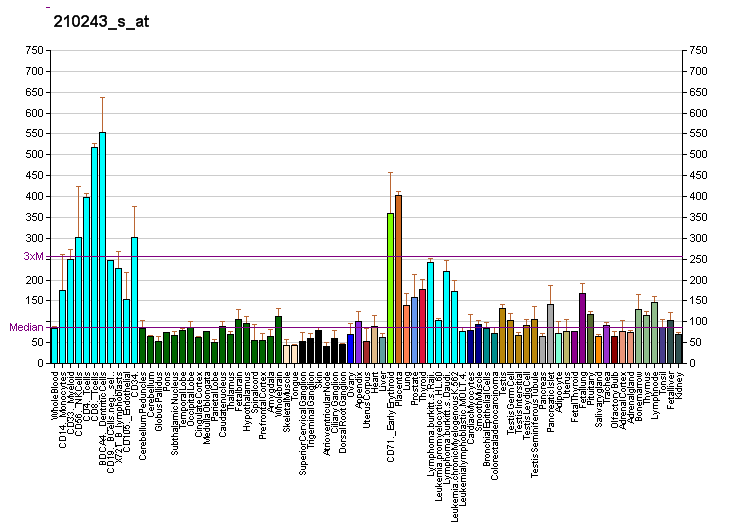
RNA expression pattern
Bgee	Human / Mouse (ortholog); Top expressed in: oocyte; granulocyte; secondary oocyte; anterior pituitary; left ovary; body of pancreas; body of stomach; right ovary; spleen; lymph node / Top expressed in: granulocyte; yolk sac; saccule; neural layer of retina; otic vesicle; islet of Langerhans; epithelium of lens; otic placode; Rostral migratory stream; Ileal epithelium; More reference expression data
BioGPS	More reference expression data
Gene ontology
Molecular function	glycosyltransferase activity; transferase activity; N-acetyllactosamine synthase activity; metal ion binding; beta-N-acetylglucosaminylglycopeptide beta-1,4-galactosyltransferase activity; galactosyltransferase activity
Cellular component	Golgi cisterna membrane; Golgi membrane; integral component of membrane; membrane; extracellular exosome; Golgi apparatus; cytosol
Biological process	protein glycosylation; keratan sulfate biosynthetic process; galactosylceramide biosynthetic process; carbohydrate metabolic process
Sources:Amigo / QuickGO
Orthologs
Databases	NCBI: entry; OMA: entry
Species	Human	Mouse
Entrez	8703	57370
Ensembl	ENSG00000158850	ENSMUSG00000052423
UniProt	O60512	Q91YY2
RefSeq (mRNA)	NM_001199873; NM_001199874; NM_003779	NM_020579
RefSeq (protein)	NP_001186802; NP_001186803; NP_003770	NP_065604
Location (UCSC)	Chr 1: 161.17 – 161.18 Mb	Chr 1: 171.1 – 171.1 Mb
PubMed search
- Wikidata
View/Edit Human	View/Edit Mouse

Beta-1,4-galactosyltransferase 3 is an enzyme that in humans is encoded by the B4GALT3 gene.

This gene is one of seven beta-1,4-galactosyltransferase (beta4GalT) genes. They encode type II membrane-bound glycoproteins that appear to have exclusive specificity for the donor substrate UDP-galactose; all transfer galactose in a beta1,4 linkage to similar acceptor sugars: GlcNAc, Glc, and Xyl. Each beta4GalT has a distinct function in the biosynthesis of different glycoconjugates and saccharide structures. As type II membrane proteins, they have an N-terminal hydrophobic signal sequence that directs the protein to the Golgi apparatus and which then remains uncleaved to function as a transmembrane anchor. By sequence similarity, the beta4GalTs form four groups: beta4GalT1 and beta4GalT2, beta4GalT3 and beta4GalT4, beta4GalT5 and beta4GalT6, and beta4GalT7. This gene encodes an enzyme that may be mainly involved in the synthesis of the first N-acetyllactosamine unit of poly-N-acetyllactosamine chains.
