= N-acetyllactosamine synthase =

Class of enzymes

Identifiers
- EC no.: 2.4.1.90
- CAS no.: 9054-94-8

Databases
- IntEnz: IntEnz view
- BRENDA: BRENDA entry
- ExPASy: NiceZyme view
- KEGG: KEGG entry
- MetaCyc: metabolic pathway
- PRIAM: profile
- PDB structures: RCSB PDB PDBe PDBsum
Search
- PMC: articles
- PubMed: articles
- NCBI: proteins

N-acetyllactosamine synthase (EC 2.4.1.90) is a galactosyltransferase enzyme that catalyzes the chemical reaction:

N-acetyl-D-glucosamine
+ UDP-galactose
UDP
N-acetyllactosamine

It forms the disaccharide, N-acetyllactosamine, by transferring the galactose group from UDP-galactose to a specific hydroxy group of N-acetyl-D-glucosamine, with uridine diphosphate (UDP) as a byproduct.

The enzyme protein is a component of lactose synthase, which converts glucose to lactose but in this reaction is acting on an amide derivative of glucose. The main function of the enzyme is associated with the biosynthesis of glycoproteins and glycolipids in both humans and animals. In humans, the activity of this enzyme can be found in Golgi apparatus.

The lack of this enzyme leads to the congenital disorder of glycosylation which is a serious neurological disease. The nature of the disease causes fluid in the brain, abnormal inflammatory response and abnormal bleeding issues.
