= B4GALT4 =

Protein-coding gene in the species Homo sapiens

Identifiers
- Aliases: B4GALT4, B4Gal-T4, beta4Gal-T4, beta-1,4-galactosyltransferase 4
- External IDs: OMIM: 604015; MGI: 1928387; GeneCards: B4GALT4
Enzyme activity
EC #	BRENDA	ExPASy	KEGG	MetaCyc
2.4.1.90	↗	↗	↗	↗
2.4.1.275	↗	↗	↗	↗

Gene location (Human)
Chr.	Chromosome 3 (human)
Band	3q13.32	Start	119,211,732 bp
Band	3q13.32	End	119,240,946 bp

Gene location (Mouse)
Chr.	Chromosome 16 (mouse)
Band	16|16 B4	Start	38,562,626 bp
Band	16|16 B4	End	38,589,411 bp
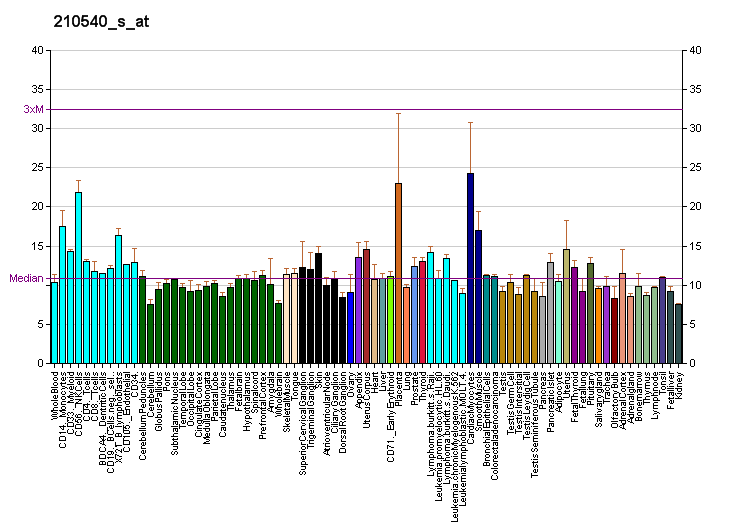

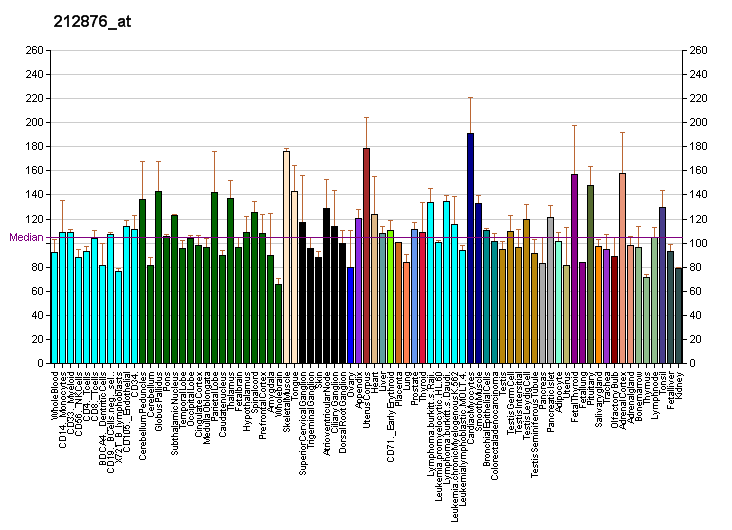
RNA expression pattern
Bgee	Human / Mouse (ortholog); Top expressed in: tendon of biceps brachii; beta cell; nasal epithelium; amniotic fluid; epithelium of nasopharynx; gallbladder; rectum; oocyte; olfactory zone of nasal mucosa; secondary oocyte / Top expressed in: zygote; interventricular septum; secondary oocyte; primary oocyte; genital tubercle; seminal vesicula; duodenum; dentate gyrus of hippocampal formation granule cell; tail of embryo; yolk sac; More reference expression data
BioGPS	More reference expression data
Gene ontology
Molecular function	metal ion binding; galactosyltransferase activity; N-acetyllactosamine synthase activity; glycosyltransferase activity; transferase activity; beta-N-acetylglucosaminylglycopeptide beta-1,4-galactosyltransferase activity
Cellular component	Golgi membrane; membrane; Golgi cisterna membrane; integral component of membrane; Golgi apparatus
Biological process	protein glycosylation; keratan sulfate biosynthetic process; membrane lipid metabolic process; carbohydrate metabolic process
Sources:Amigo / QuickGO
Orthologs
Databases	NCBI: entry; OMA: entry
Species	Human	Mouse
Entrez	8702	56375
Ensembl	ENSG00000121578	ENSMUSG00000022793
UniProt	O60513	Q9JJ04
RefSeq (mRNA)	NM_003778; NM_212543	NM_001285793; NM_019804
RefSeq (protein)	NP_003769; NP_997708	NP_001272722; NP_062778
Location (UCSC)	Chr 3: 119.21 – 119.24 Mb	Chr 16: 38.56 – 38.59 Mb
PubMed search
- Wikidata
View/Edit Human	View/Edit Mouse

Beta-1,4-galactosyltransferase 4 is an enzyme that in humans is encoded by the B4GALT4 gene.

This gene is one of seven beta-1,4-galactosyltransferase (beta4GalT) genes. They encode type II membrane-bound glycoproteins that appear to have exclusive specificity for the donor substrate UDP-galactose; all transfer galactose in a beta1,4 linkage to similar acceptor sugars: GlcNAc, Glc, and Xyl. Each beta4GalT has a distinct function in the biosynthesis of different glycoconjugates and saccharide structures. As type II membrane proteins, they have an N-terminal hydrophobic signal sequence that directs the protein to the Golgi apparatus and which then remains uncleaved to function as a transmembrane anchor. By sequence similarity, the beta4GalTs form four groups: beta4GalT1 and beta4GalT2, beta4GalT3 and beta4GalT4, beta4GalT5 and beta4GalT6, and beta4GalT7. The enzyme encoded by this gene appears to mainly play a role in glycolipid biosynthesis. Two alternatively spliced transcript variants have been found for this gene.
