= B3GALT5 =

Protein-coding gene in the species Homo sapiens

Identifiers
- Aliases: B3GALT5, B3GalT-V, B3GalTx, B3T5, GLCT5, beta-1,3-GalTase 5, beta-3-Gx-T5, beta3Gal-T5, beta-1,3-galactosyltransferase 5
- External IDs: OMIM: 604066; MGI: 2136878; GeneCards: B3GALT5

Gene location (Human)
Chr.	Chromosome 21 (human)
Band	21q22.2	Start	39,556,442 bp
Band	21q22.2	End	39,673,137 bp

Gene location (Mouse)
Chr.	Chromosome 16 (mouse)
Band	16|16 C4	Start	96,037,001 bp
Band	16|16 C4	End	96,121,059 bp
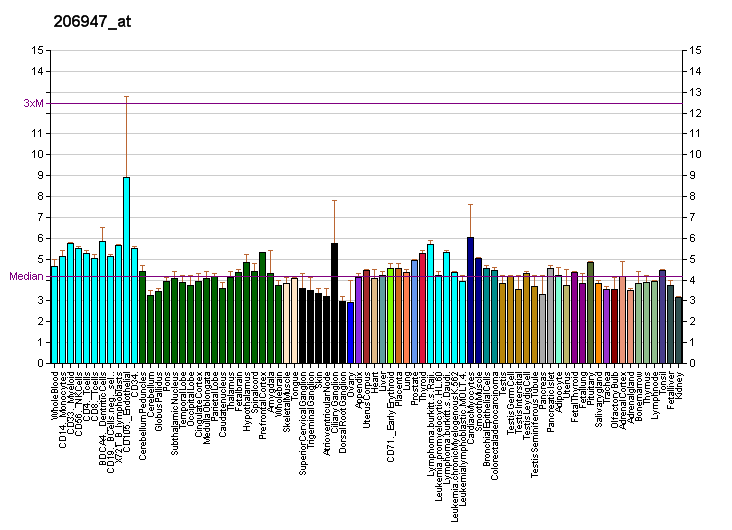
RNA expression pattern
Bgee	Human / Mouse (ortholog); Top expressed in: palpebral conjunctiva; mucosa of sigmoid colon; jejunal mucosa; rectum; duodenum; mucosa of transverse colon; amniotic fluid; sperm; gonad; mucosa of ileum / Top expressed in: left colon; interventricular septum; lumbar subsegment of spinal cord; anterior horn of spinal cord; facial motor nucleus; visual cortex; primary visual cortex; superior frontal gyrus; dentate gyrus of hippocampal formation granule cell; deep cerebellar nuclei; More reference expression data
BioGPS	More reference expression data
Gene ontology
Molecular function	transferase activity; UDP-galactose:beta-N-acetylglucosamine beta-1,3-galactosyltransferase activity; galactosyltransferase activity; glycosyltransferase activity; acetylgalactosaminyltransferase activity
Cellular component	integral component of membrane; Golgi membrane; Golgi apparatus; endoplasmic reticulum; membrane
Biological process	protein glycosylation; protein N-linked glycosylation; oligosaccharide biosynthetic process
Sources:Amigo / QuickGO
Orthologs
Databases	NCBI: entry; OMA: entry
Species	Human	Mouse
Entrez	10317	93961
Ensembl	ENSG00000183778	ENSMUSG00000074892
UniProt	Q9Y2C3	Q9JI67
RefSeq (mRNA)	NM_033173; NM_001278650; NM_006057; NM_033170; NM_033171 NM_033172; NM_001356336; NM_001356338; NM_001356339	NM_001122993; NM_033149; NM_001358389; NM_001358390
RefSeq (protein)	NP_001265579; NP_006048; NP_149360; NP_149361; NP_149362 NP_001343265; NP_001343267; NP_001343268	NP_001116465; NP_149161; NP_001345318; NP_001345319
Location (UCSC)	Chr 21: 39.56 – 39.67 Mb	Chr 16: 96.04 – 96.12 Mb
PubMed search
- Wikidata
View/Edit Human	View/Edit Mouse

Beta-1,3-galactosyltransferase 5 is an enzyme that in humans is encoded by the B3GALT5 gene.

This gene is a member of the beta-1,3-galactosyltransferase (beta3GalT) gene family. This family encodes type II membrane-bound glycoproteins with diverse enzymatic functions using different donor substrates (UDP-galactose and UDP-N-acetylglucosamine) and different acceptor sugars (N-acetylglucosamine, galactose, N-acetylgalactosamine). The beta3GalT genes are distantly related to the Drosophila Brainiac gene and have the protein coding sequence contained in a single exon. The beta3GalT proteins also contain conserved sequences not found in the beta4GalT or alpha3GalT proteins. The carbohydrate chains synthesized by these enzymes are designated as type 1, whereas beta4GalT enzymes synthesize type 2 carbohydrate chains. The ratio of type 1:type 2 chains changes during embryogenesis. By sequence similarity, the beta3GalT genes fall into at least two groups: beta3GalT4 and 4 other beta3GalT genes (beta3GalT1-3, beta3GalT5). This gene encodes the most probable candidate for synthesis of the type 1 Lewis antigens which are frequently found to be elevated in gastrointestinal and pancreatic cancers. The encoded protein is inactive with N-linked glycoproteins and functions in mucin glycosylation. Five transcript variants have been described which differ in the 5' UTR. All transcript variants encode an identical protein.
