= B3GALNT1 =

Gene of the species Homo sapiens

Identifiers
- Aliases: B3GALNT1, B3GALT3, GLCT3, GLOB, Gb4Cer, P1, beta3Gal-T3, galT3, beta-1,3-N-acetylgalactosaminyltransferase 1 (globoside blood group)
- External IDs: OMIM: 603094; MGI: 1349405; GeneCards: B3GALNT1
Enzyme activity
EC #	BRENDA	ExPASy	KEGG	MetaCyc
2.4.1.79	↗	↗	↗	↗

Gene location (Mouse)
Chr.	Chromosome 3 (mouse)
Band	3|3 E1	Start	69,481,491 bp
Band	3|3 E1	End	69,506,293 bp
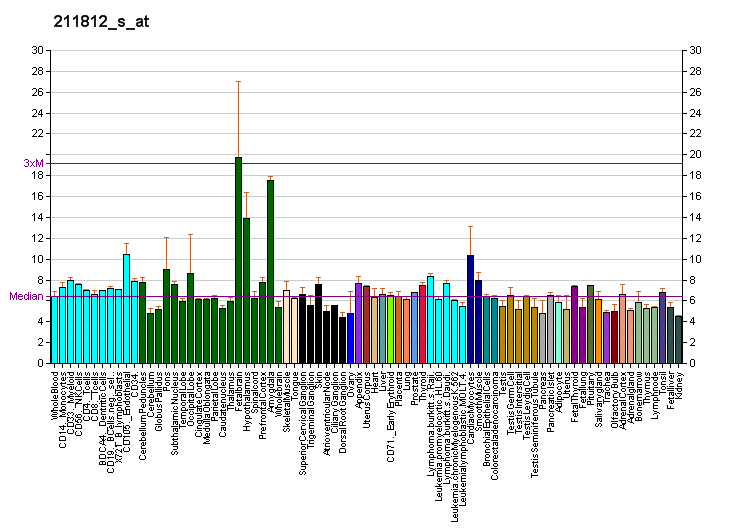

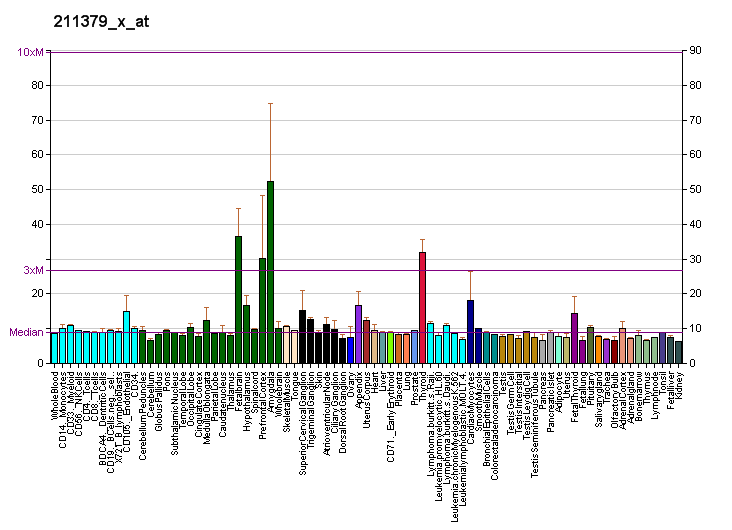
RNA expression pattern
Bgee	Human / Mouse (ortholog); n/a / Top expressed in: gastrula; substantia nigra; median eminence; suprachiasmatic nucleus; decidua; dorsomedial hypothalamic nucleus; cumulus cell; arcuate nucleus; spermatocyte; facial motor nucleus
BioGPS	More reference expression data
Gene ontology
Molecular function	transferase activity; galactosyltransferase activity; glycosyltransferase activity; galactosylgalactosylglucosylceramide beta-D-acetylgalactosaminyltransferase activity; UDP-galactose:beta-N-acetylglucosamine beta-1,3-galactosyltransferase activity; acetylgalactosaminyltransferase activity
Cellular component	integral component of membrane; Golgi apparatus; membrane; Golgi membrane; endoplasmic reticulum
Biological process	oligosaccharide biosynthetic process; glycosphingolipid metabolic process; protein glycosylation; protein N-linked glycosylation
Sources:Amigo / QuickGO
Orthologs
Databases	NCBI: entry; OMA: entry
Species	Human	Mouse
Entrez	8706	26879
Ensembl	ENSG00000169255	ENSMUSG00000043300
UniProt	O75752	Q920V1
RefSeq (mRNA)	NM_001038628; NM_003781; NM_033167; NM_033168; NM_033169	NM_020026
RefSeq (protein)	NP_001033717; NP_003772; NP_149357; NP_149358; NP_149359 NP_001336059; NP_001336060; NP_001336061; NP_001336062; NP_001336063; NP_001336064; NP_001336065; NP_001336066; NP_001336067; NP_001336068; NP_001336069; NP_001336070; NP_001336071; NP_001336072; NP_001336073; NP_001336074; NP_001336075; NP_001336076; NP_001336077; NP_001336078; NP_001336079; NP_001336080; NP_001336081; NP_001336082; NP_001336083; NP_001336084; NP_001336085; NP_001336086; NP_001336087; NP_001336088; NP_001336089; NP_001336090; NP_001336091; NP_001336092	NP_064410
Location (UCSC)	n/a	Chr 3: 69.48 – 69.51 Mb
PubMed search
- Wikidata
View/Edit Human	View/Edit Mouse

UDP-GalNAc:beta-1,3-N-acetylgalactosaminyltransferase 1 is an enzyme that in humans is encoded by the B3GALNT1 gene.

This gene is a member of the beta-1,3-galactosyltransferase (beta3GalT) gene family. This family encodes type II membrane-bound glycoproteins with diverse enzymatic functions using different donor substrates (UDP-galactose and UDP-N-acetylgalactosamine) and different acceptor sugars (N-acetylglucosamine, galactose, N-acetylgalactosamine). The beta3GalT genes are distantly related to the Drosophila Brainiac gene and have the protein coding sequence contained in a single exon. The beta3GalT proteins also contain conserved sequences not found in the beta4GalT or alpha3GalT proteins. The carbohydrate chains synthesized by these enzymes are designated as type 1, whereas beta4GalT enzymes synthesize type 2 carbohydrate chains. The ratio of type 1:type 2 chains changes during embryogenesis. By sequence similarity, the beta3GalT genes fall into at least two groups: beta3GalT4 and 4 other beta3GalT genes (beta3GalT1-3, beta3GalT5). The encoded protein of this gene does not use N-acetylglucosamine as an acceptor sugar at all. Multiple transcript variants that are alternatively spliced in the 5' UTR have been described; they all encode the same protein.
