= N-acetyl-beta-glucosaminyl-glycoprotein 4-beta-N-acetylgalactosaminyltransferase =

Class of enzymes

Identifiers
- EC no.: 2.4.1.244

Databases
- IntEnz: IntEnz view
- BRENDA: BRENDA entry
- ExPASy: NiceZyme view
- KEGG: KEGG entry
- MetaCyc: metabolic pathway
- PRIAM: profile
- PDB structures: RCSB PDB PDBe PDBsum
Search
- PMC: articles
- PubMed: articles
- NCBI: proteins

N-acetyl-beta-glucosaminyl-glycoprotein 4-beta-N-acetylgalactosaminyltransferase (EC 2.4.1.244, beta1,4-N-acetylgalactosaminyltransferase III, beta4GalNAc-T3, beta1,4-N-acetylgalactosaminyltransferase IV, beta4GalNAc-T4, UDP-N-acetyl-D-galactosamine:N-acetyl-D-glucosaminyl-group beta-1,4-N-acetylgalactosaminyltransferase) is an enzyme with systematic name UDP-N-acetyl-D-galactosamine:N-acetyl-beta-D-glucosaminyl-group 4-beta-N-acetylgalactosaminyltransferase. This enzyme catalyses the following chemical reaction

UDP-N-acetyl-D-galactosamine + N-acetyl-beta-D-glucosaminyl group $\rightleftharpoons$ UDP + N-acetyl-beta-D-galactosaminyl-(1->4)-N-acetyl-beta-D-glucosaminyl group

The enzyme from human can transfer N-acetyl-D-galactosamine (GalNAc) to N-glycan and O-glycan substrates that have N-acetyl-D-glucosamine (GlcNAc).
