= Glycosaminoglycan galactosyltransferase =

Class of enzymes

glycosaminoglycan galactosyltransferase

Identifiers
- EC no.: 2.4.1.74
- CAS no.: 51004-28-5

Databases
- IntEnz: IntEnz view
- BRENDA: BRENDA entry
- ExPASy: NiceZyme view
- KEGG: KEGG entry
- MetaCyc: metabolic pathway
- PRIAM: profile
- PDB structures: RCSB PDB PDBe PDBsum
- Gene Ontology: AmiGO / QuickGO
Search
- PMC: articles
- PubMed: articles
- NCBI: proteins

In enzymology, a glycosaminoglycan galactosyltransferase (EC 2.4.1.74) is an enzyme that catalyzes the chemical reaction

UDP-galactose + glycosaminoglycan $\rightleftharpoons$ UDP + D-galactosylglycosaminoglycan

Thus, the two substrates of this enzyme are UDP-galactose and glycosaminoglycan, whereas its two products are UDP and D-galactosylglycosaminoglycan.

This enzyme belongs to the family of glycosyltransferases, specifically the hexosyltransferases. The systematic name of this enzyme class is UDP-galactose:glycosaminoglycan D-galactosyltransferase. This enzyme is also called uridine diphosphogalactose-mucopolysaccharide galactosyltransferase.
