= Fucosylgalactoside 3-alpha-galactosyltransferase =

Class of enzymes

fucosylgalactoside 3-alpha-galactosyltransferase

Identifiers
- EC no.: 2.4.1.37
- CAS no.: 37257-33-3

Databases
- IntEnz: IntEnz view
- BRENDA: BRENDA entry
- ExPASy: NiceZyme view
- KEGG: KEGG entry
- MetaCyc: metabolic pathway
- PRIAM: profile
- PDB structures: RCSB PDB PDBe PDBsum
- Gene Ontology: AmiGO / QuickGO
Search
- PMC: articles
- PubMed: articles
- NCBI: proteins

In enzymology, a fucosylgalactoside 3-alpha-galactosyltransferase (EC 2.4.1.37) is an enzyme that catalyzes the chemical reaction

UDP-galactose + alpha-L-fucosyl-(1->2)-D-galactosyl-R $\rightleftharpoons$ UDP + alpha-D-galactosyl-(1->3)-[alpha-L-fucosyl(1->2)]-D-galactosyl-R

Thus, the two substrates of this enzyme are UDP-galactose and [[alpha-L-fucosyl-(1->2)-D-galactosyl-R]], whereas its two products are UDP and [[alpha-D-galactosyl-(1->3)-[alpha-L-fucosyl(1->2)]-D-galactosyl-R]].

This enzyme belongs to the family of glycosyltransferases, specifically the hexosyltransferases. The systematic name of this enzyme class is UDP-galactose:alpha-L-fucosyl-(1->2)-D-galactoside 3-alpha-D-galactosyltransferase. Other names in common use include UDP-galactose:O-alpha-L-fucosyl(1->2)D-galactose, alpha-D-galactosyltransferase, UDPgalactose:glycoprotein-alpha-L-fucosyl-(1,2)-D-galactose, 3-alpha-D-galactosyltransferase, [blood group substance] alpha-galactosyltransferase, blood-group substance B-dependent galactosyltransferase, glycoprotein-fucosylgalactoside alpha-galactosyltransferase, histo-blood group B transferase, and histo-blood substance B-dependent galactosyltransferase. This enzyme participates in 3 metabolic pathways: glycosphingolipid biosynthesis - lactoseries, glycosphingolipid biosynthesis - neo-lactoseries, and glycan structures - biosynthesis 2.

== Structural studies ==
As of late 2007, 7 structures have been solved for this class of enzymes, with PDB accession codes 1R7U, 1R7X, 1R80, 1R82, 2A8W, 2PGV, and 2PGY.
