= N-acetylhexosamine 1-dehydrogenase =

Identifiers
- EC no.: 1.1.1.240
- CAS no.: 122785-18-6

Databases
- IntEnz: IntEnz view
- BRENDA: BRENDA entry
- ExPASy: NiceZyme view
- KEGG: KEGG entry
- MetaCyc: metabolic pathway
- PRIAM: profile
- PDB structures: RCSB PDB PDBe PDBsum
- Gene Ontology: AmiGO / QuickGO
Search
- PMC: articles
- PubMed: articles
- NCBI: proteins

In enzymology, a N-acetylhexosamine 1-dehydrogenase (EC 1.1.1.240) is an enzyme that catalyzes the chemical reaction

N-acetyl-D-glucosamine + NAD^{+} $\rightleftharpoons$ N-acetyl-D-glucosaminate + NADH + H^{+}

Thus, the two substrates of this enzyme are N-acetyl-D-glucosamine and NAD^{+}, whereas its 3 products are N-acetyl-D-glucosaminate, NADH, and H^{+}.

This enzyme belongs to the family of oxidoreductases, specifically those acting on the CH-OH group of donor with NAD^{+} or NADP^{+} as acceptor. The systematic name of this enzyme class is N-acetyl-D-hexosamine:NAD^{+} 1-oxidoreductase. Other names in common use include N-acetylhexosamine dehydrogenase, and N-acetyl-D-hexosamine dehydrogenase.
