= N-acylsphingosine galactosyltransferase =

Class of enzymes

Identifiers
- EC no.: 2.4.1.47
- CAS no.: 37277-56-8

Databases
- IntEnz: IntEnz view
- BRENDA: BRENDA entry
- ExPASy: NiceZyme view
- KEGG: KEGG entry
- MetaCyc: metabolic pathway
- PRIAM: profile
- PDB structures: RCSB PDB PDBe PDBsum
- Gene Ontology: AmiGO / QuickGO
Search
- PMC: articles
- PubMed: articles
- NCBI: proteins

In enzymology, a N-acylsphingosine galactosyltransferase (EC 2.4.1.47) is an enzyme that catalyzes the chemical reaction

UDP-galactose + N-acylsphingosine $\rightleftharpoons$ UDP + D-galactosylceramide

Thus, the two substrates of this enzyme are UDP-galactose and N-acylsphingosine, whereas its two products are UDP and D-galactosylceramide.

This enzyme belongs to the family of glycosyltransferases, specifically the hexosyltransferases. The systematic name of this enzyme class is UDP-galactose:N-acylsphingosine D-galactosyltransferase. Other names in common use include UDP galactose-N-acylsphingosine galactosyltransferase, and uridine diphosphogalactose-acylsphingosine galactosyltransferase. This enzyme participates in sphingolipid metabolism.
