= N-acetyllactosaminide 3-alpha-galactosyltransferase =

Class of enzymes

Identifiers
- EC no.: 2.4.1.87
- CAS no.: 128449-51-4

Databases
- IntEnz: IntEnz view
- BRENDA: BRENDA entry
- ExPASy: NiceZyme view
- KEGG: KEGG entry
- MetaCyc: metabolic pathway
- PRIAM: profile
- PDB structures: RCSB PDB PDBe PDBsum
- Gene Ontology: AmiGO / QuickGO
Search
- PMC: articles
- PubMed: articles
- NCBI: proteins

In enzymology, a N-acetyllactosaminide 3-alpha-galactosyltransferase (EC 2.4.1.87) is an enzyme that catalyzes the chemical reaction

UDP-galactose + beta-D-galactosyl-(1->4)-beta-N-acetyl-D-glucosaminyl-R $\rightleftharpoons$ UDP + alpha-D-galactosyl-(1->3)-beta-D-galactosyl-(1->4)-beta-N- acetylglucosaminyl-R

Thus, the two substrates of this enzyme are UDP-galactose and [[beta-D-galactosyl-(1->4)-beta-N-acetyl-D-glucosaminyl-R]], whereas its 3 products are UDP, [[alpha-D-galactosyl-(1->3)-beta-D-galactosyl-(1->4)-beta-N-]], and acetylglucosaminyl-R.

This enzyme belongs to the family of glycosyltransferases, specifically the hexosyltransferases. The systematic name of this enzyme class is UDP-galactose:N-acetyllactosaminide 3-alpha-D-galactosyltransferase. Other names in common use include alpha-galactosyltransferase, UDP-Gal:beta-D-Gal(1,4)-D-GlcNAc alpha(1,3)-galactosyltransferase, UDP-Gal:N-acetyllactosaminide alpha(1,3)-galactosyltransferase, UDP-Gal:N-acetyllactosaminide alpha-1,3-D-galactosyltransferase, UDP-Gal:Galbeta1->4GlcNAc-R alpha1->3-galactosyltransferase, UDP-galactose-acetyllactosamine alpha-D-galactosyltransferase, UDPgalactose:beta-D-galactosyl-beta-1,4-N-acetyl-D-glucosaminyl-, glycopeptide alpha-1,3-D-galactosyltransferase, glucosaminylglycopeptide alpha-1,3-galactosyltransferase, uridine diphosphogalactose-acetyllactosamine, alpha1->3-galactosyltransferase, uridine diphosphogalactose-acetyllactosamine galactosyltransferase, uridine, diphosphogalactose-, galactosylacetylglucosaminylgalactosylglucosylceramide, galactosyltransferase, beta-D-galactosyl-N-acetylglucosaminylglycopeptide, and alpha-1,3-galactosyltransferase. This enzyme participates in 3 metabolic pathways: glycosphingolipid biosynthesis - lactoseries, glycosphingolipid biosynthesis - neo-lactoseries, and glycan structures - biosynthesis 2.

== Structural studies ==
As of late 2007, 3 structures have been solved for this class of enzymes, with PDB accession codes 2JCF, 2JCK, and 2JCL.
