= Glucosaminylgalactosylglucosylceramide beta-galactosyltransferase =

Class of enzymes

glucosaminylgalactosylglucosylceramide beta-galactosyltransferase

Identifiers
- EC no.: 2.4.1.86
- CAS no.: 9073-46-5

Databases
- IntEnz: IntEnz view
- BRENDA: BRENDA entry
- ExPASy: NiceZyme view
- KEGG: KEGG entry
- MetaCyc: metabolic pathway
- PRIAM: profile
- PDB structures: RCSB PDB PDBe PDBsum
- Gene Ontology: AmiGO / QuickGO
Search
- PMC: articles
- PubMed: articles
- NCBI: proteins

In enzymology, a glucosaminylgalactosylglucosylceramide beta-galactosyltransferase (EC 2.4.1.86) is an enzyme that catalyzes the chemical reaction

UDP-galactose + N-acetyl-beta-D-glucosaminyl-(1->3)-beta-D-galactosyl-(1->4)-beta-D- glucosyl-(11)-ceramide $\rightleftharpoons$ UDP + beta-D-galactosyl-(1->3)-N-acetyl-beta-D-glucosaminyl-(1->3)-beta-D- galactosyl-(1->4)-beta-D-glucosyl-(11)-ceramide

The 3 substrates of this enzyme are UDP-galactose, [[N-acetyl-beta-D-glucosaminyl-(1->3)-beta-D-galactosyl-(1->4)-beta-D-]], and glucosyl-(11)-ceramide, whereas its 3 products are UDP, [[beta-D-galactosyl-(1->3)-N-acetyl-beta-D-glucosaminyl-(1->3)-beta-D-]], and [[galactosyl-(1->4)-beta-D-glucosyl-(11)-ceramide]].

This enzyme belongs to the family of glycosyltransferases, specifically the hexosyltransferases. The systematic name of this enzyme class is UDP-galactose:N-acetyl-beta-D-glucosaminyl-(1->3)-beta-D-galactosyl- (1->4)-beta-D-glucosylceramide 3-beta-D-galactosyltransferase. Other names in common use include uridine, diphosphogalactose-acetyl-glucosaminylgalactosylglucosylceramide, galactosyltransferase, GalT-4, paragloboside synthase, glucosaminylgalactosylglucosylceramide 4-beta-galactosyltransferase, lactotriaosylceramide 4-beta-galactosyltransferase, UDP-galactose:N-acetyl-D-glucosaminyl-1,3-D-galactosyl-1,4-D-, glucosylceramide beta-D-galactosyltransferase, and UDP-Gal:LcOse3Cer(beta 1-4)galactosyltransferase.
