= Xylosylprotein 4-beta-galactosyltransferase =

Class of enzymes

xylosylprotein 4-beta-galactosyltransferase

Identifiers
- EC no.: 2.4.1.133
- CAS no.: 52227-72-2

Databases
- IntEnz: IntEnz view
- BRENDA: BRENDA entry
- ExPASy: NiceZyme view
- KEGG: KEGG entry
- MetaCyc: metabolic pathway
- PRIAM: profile
- PDB structures: RCSB PDB PDBe PDBsum
- Gene Ontology: AmiGO / QuickGO
Search
- PMC: articles
- PubMed: articles
- NCBI: proteins

In enzymology, a xylosylprotein 4-beta-galactosyltransferase (EC 2.4.1.133) is an enzyme that catalyzes the chemical reaction

UDP-galactose + O-beta-D-xylosylprotein $\rightleftharpoons$ UDP + 4-beta-D-galactosyl-O-beta-D-xylosylprotein

Thus, the two substrates of this enzyme are UDP-galactose and O-beta-D-xylosylprotein, whereas its two products are UDP and 4-beta-D-galactosyl-O-beta-D-xylosylprotein.

This enzyme belongs to the family of glycosyltransferases, specifically the hexosyltransferases. The systematic name of this enzyme class is UDP-galactose:O-beta-D-xylosylprotein 4-beta-D-galactosyltransferase. Other names in common use include UDP-D-galactose:D-xylose galactosyltransferase, UDP-D-galactose:xylose galactosyltransferase, galactosyltransferase I, and uridine diphosphogalactose-xylose galactosyltransferase. This enzyme participates in chondroitin sulfate biosynthesis and glycan structures - biosynthesis 1. It employs one cofactor, manganese.
