= C15H24N2O17P2 =

The molecular formula C_{15}H_{24}N_{2}O_{17}P_{2} may refer to:

- Uridine diphosphate glucose
- Uridine diphosphate galactose
