= N-Acetylglucosamine receptor =

Receptor which binds N-Acetylglucosamine

heterogeneous nuclear ribonucleoprotein M

Identifiers
- Symbol: HNRPM
- Alt. symbols: NAGR1
- NCBI gene: 4670
- HGNC: 5046
- OMIM: 160994
- RefSeq: NM_005968
- UniProt: P52272

Other data
- Locus: Chr. 19 p13.3-13.2
Search for
- Structures: Swiss-model
- Domains: InterPro

The N-Acetylglucosamine receptor is a receptor which binds N-Acetylglucosamine.

== Studies ==
The N-Acetylglucosamine (GlcNAc) receptor has been recently found to interact and bind with vimentins at the cell surface. Research indicates that the GlcNAc receptor can therefore be used to target vimentin-expressing cells for gene delivery via receptor-mediated endocytosis.
