= UDP-galactose—UDP-N-acetylglucosamine galactose phosphotransferase =

UDP-galactose-UDP-N-acetylglucosamine galactose phosphotransferase

Identifiers
- EC no.: 2.7.8.18
- CAS no.: 84932-43-4

Databases
- IntEnz: IntEnz view
- BRENDA: BRENDA entry
- ExPASy: NiceZyme view
- KEGG: KEGG entry
- MetaCyc: metabolic pathway
- PRIAM: profile
- PDB structures: RCSB PDB PDBe PDBsum
- Gene Ontology: AmiGO / QuickGO
Search
- PMC: articles
- PubMed: articles
- NCBI: proteins

In enzymology, an UDP-galactose—UDP-N-acetylglucosamine galactose phosphotransferase (EC 2.7.8.18) is an enzyme that catalyzes the chemical reaction

UDP-galactose + UDP-N-acetyl-D-glucosamine $\rightleftharpoons$ UMP + UDP-N-acetyl-6-(D-galactose-1-phospho)-D-glucosamine

Thus, the two substrates of this enzyme are UDP-galactose and UDP-N-acetyl-D-glucosamine, whereas its two products are UMP and UDP-N-acetyl-6-(D-galactose-1-phospho)-D-glucosamine.

This enzyme belongs to the family of transferases, specifically those transferring phosphorus-containing groups transferases for other substituted phosphate groups. The systematic name of this enzyme class is UDP-galactose:UDP-N-acetyl-D-glucosamine galactose phosphotransferase. Other names in common use include uridine diphosphogalactose-uridine diphosphoacetylglucosamine galactose-1-phosphotransferase, galactose-1-phosphotransferase, and galactosyl phosphotransferase.
