= Lipopolysaccharide 3-alpha-galactosyltransferase =

Class of enzymes

lipopolysaccharide 3-alpha-galactosyltransferase

Identifiers
- EC no.: 2.4.1.44
- CAS no.: 9073-98-7

Databases
- IntEnz: IntEnz view
- BRENDA: BRENDA entry
- ExPASy: NiceZyme view
- KEGG: KEGG entry
- MetaCyc: metabolic pathway
- PRIAM: profile
- PDB structures: RCSB PDB PDBe PDBsum
- Gene Ontology: AmiGO / QuickGO
Search
- PMC: articles
- PubMed: articles
- NCBI: proteins

In enzymology, a lipopolysaccharide 3-alpha-galactosyltransferase (EC 2.4.1.44) is an enzyme that catalyzes the chemical reaction

UDP-galactose + lipopolysaccharide $\rightleftharpoons$ UDP + 3-alpha-D-galactosyl-[lipopolysaccharide glucose]

Thus, the two substrates of this enzyme are UDP-galactose and lipopolysaccharide, whereas its two products are UDP and [[3-alpha-D-galactosyl-[lipopolysaccharide glucose]]].

This enzyme belongs to the family of glycosyltransferases, specifically the hexosyltransferases. The systematic name of this enzyme class is UDP-galactose:lipopolysaccharide 3-alpha-D-galactosyltransferase. Other names in common use include UDP-galactose:lipopolysaccharide alpha,3-galactosyltransferase, UDP-galactose:polysaccharide galactosyltransferase, uridine diphosphate galactose:lipopolysaccharide, alpha-3-galactosyltransferase, uridine diphosphogalactose-lipopolysaccharide, and alpha,3-galactosyltransferase. This enzyme participates in lipopolysaccharide biosynthesis and glycan structures - biosynthesis 2.

== Structural studies ==
As of late 2007, two structures have been solved for this class of enzymes, with PDB accession codes 1GA8 and 1SS9.
