= B3GALT4 =

Protein-coding gene in the species Homo sapiens

Identifiers
- Aliases: B3GALT4, BETA3GALT4, GALT2, GALT4, beta-1,3-galactosyltransferase 4
- External IDs: OMIM: 603095; MGI: 1859517; GeneCards: B3GALT4
Enzyme activity
EC #	BRENDA	ExPASy	KEGG	MetaCyc
2.4.1.62	↗	↗	↗	↗

Gene location (Human)
Chr.	Chromosome 6 (human)
Band	6p21.32	Start	33,277,123 bp
Band	6p21.32	End	33,284,832 bp

Gene location (Mouse)
Chr.	Chromosome 17 (mouse)
Band	17|17 B1	Start	34,168,883 bp
Band	17|17 B1	End	34,170,462 bp
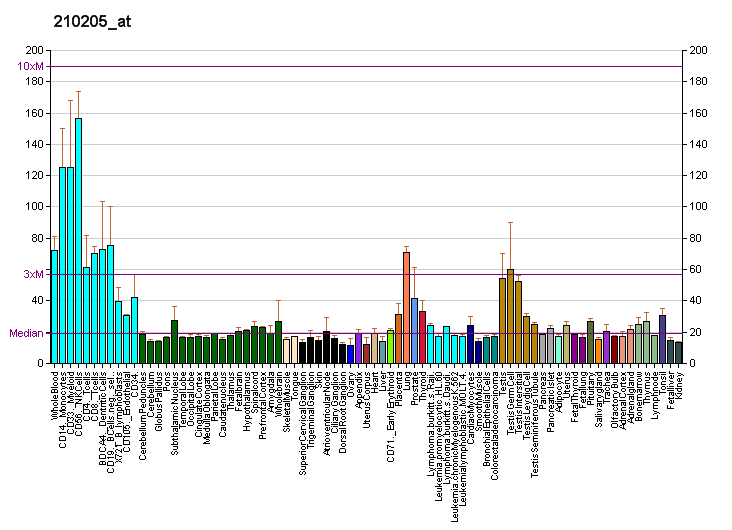
RNA expression pattern
Bgee	Human / Mouse (ortholog); Top expressed in: mucosa of transverse colon; granulocyte; left testis; right testis; olfactory zone of nasal mucosa; apex of heart; Descending thoracic aorta; skin of leg; ascending aorta; monocyte / Top expressed in: pyloric antrum; gastric mucosa; seminal vesicula; mucous cell of stomach; intestinal villus; epithelium of stomach; otic vesicle; crypt of lieberkuhn of small intestine; granulocyte; lacrimal gland; More reference expression data
BioGPS	More reference expression data
Gene ontology
Molecular function	transferase activity; galactosyltransferase activity; ganglioside galactosyltransferase activity; glycosyltransferase activity; UDP-galactose:beta-N-acetylglucosamine beta-1,3-galactosyltransferase activity; acetylgalactosaminyltransferase activity
Cellular component	integral component of membrane; Golgi membrane; Golgi apparatus; membrane; endoplasmic reticulum
Biological process	ganglioside biosynthetic process; protein glycosylation
Sources:Amigo / QuickGO
Orthologs
Databases	NCBI: entry; OMA: entry
Species	Human	Mouse
Entrez	8705	54218
Ensembl	ENSG00000236802; ENSG00000235155; ENSG00000226936; ENSG00000206285; ENSG00000235863 n/a	ENSMUSG00000067370
UniProt	O96024	Q9Z0F0
RefSeq (mRNA)	NM_003782	NM_019420
RefSeq (protein)	NP_003773	NP_062293
Location (UCSC)	Chr 6: 33.28 – 33.28 Mb	Chr 17: 34.17 – 34.17 Mb
PubMed search
- Wikidata
View/Edit Human	View/Edit Mouse

Beta-1,3-galactosyltransferase 4 is an enzyme that in humans is encoded by the B3GALT4 gene.

This gene is a member of the beta-1,3-galactosyltransferase (beta3GalT) gene family. This family encodes type II membrane-bound glycoproteins with diverse enzymatic functions using different donor substrates (UDP-galactose and UDP-N-acetylglucosamine) and different acceptor sugars (N-acetylglucosamine, galactose, N-acetylgalactosamine). The beta3GalT genes are distantly related to the Drosophila Brainiac gene and have the protein coding sequence contained in a single exon. The beta3GalT proteins also contain conserved sequences not found in the beta4GalT or alpha3GalT proteins. The carbohydrate chains synthesized by these enzymes are designated as type 1, whereas beta4GalT enzymes synthesize type 2 carbohydrate chains. The ratio of type 1:type 2 chains changes during embryogenesis. By sequence similarity, the beta3GalT genes fall into at least two groups: beta3GalT4 and 4 other beta3GalT genes (beta3GalT1-3, beta3GalT5). This gene is oriented telomere to centromere in close proximity to the ribosomal protein S18 gene. The functionality of the encoded protein is limited to ganglioseries glycolipid biosynthesis.
