= N-acylhexosamine oxidase =

Identifiers
- EC no.: 1.1.3.29
- CAS no.: 121479-58-1

Databases
- IntEnz: IntEnz view
- BRENDA: BRENDA entry
- ExPASy: NiceZyme view
- KEGG: KEGG entry
- MetaCyc: metabolic pathway
- PRIAM: profile
- PDB structures: RCSB PDB PDBe PDBsum
- Gene Ontology: AmiGO / QuickGO
Search
- PMC: articles
- PubMed: articles
- NCBI: proteins

In enzymology, N-acylhexosamine oxidase (EC 1.1.3.29) is an enzyme that catalyzes the chemical reaction

N-acetyl-D-glucosamine
+ H_{2}O
O_{2}
H_{2}O_{2}
O_{2}
H_{2}O_{2}
N-acetyl-D-glucosaminic acid

The two substrates of this enzyme are N-acetyl-D-glucosamine and oxygen. Its products are N-acetyl-D-glucosaminic acid and hydrogen peroxide.

This enzyme belongs to the family of oxidoreductases, specifically those acting on the CH-OH group of donor with oxygen as acceptor. The systematic name of this enzyme class is N-acyl-D-hexosamine:oxygen 1-oxidoreductase. Other names in common use include N-acyl-D-hexosamine oxidase, and N-acyl-beta-D-hexosamine:oxygen 1-oxidoreductase.
