= Indolylacetyl-myo-inositol galactosyltransferase =

Class of enzymes

indolylacetyl-myo-inositol galactosyltransferase

Identifiers
- EC no.: 2.4.1.156
- CAS no.: 85537-80-0

Databases
- IntEnz: IntEnz view
- BRENDA: BRENDA entry
- ExPASy: NiceZyme view
- KEGG: KEGG entry
- MetaCyc: metabolic pathway
- PRIAM: profile
- PDB structures: RCSB PDB PDBe PDBsum
- Gene Ontology: AmiGO / QuickGO
Search
- PMC: articles
- PubMed: articles
- NCBI: proteins

In enzymology, an indolylacetyl-myo-inositol galactosyltransferase (EC 2.4.1.156) is an enzyme that catalyzes the chemical reaction

UDP-galactose + (indol-3-yl)acetyl-myo-inositol $\rightleftharpoons$ UDP + 5-O-(indol-3-yl)acetyl-myo-inositol D-galactoside

Thus, the two substrates of this enzyme are UDP-galactose and indol-3-ylacetyl-myo-inositol, whereas its two products are UDP and 5-O-(indol-3-yl)acetyl-myo-inositol D-galactoside.

This enzyme belongs to the family of glycosyltransferases, specifically the hexosyltransferases. The systematic name of this enzyme class is UDP-galactose:(indol-3-yl)acetyl-myo-inositol 5-O-D-galactosyltransferase. Other names in common use include uridine diphosphogalactose-indolylacetylinositol, galactosyltransferase, indol-3-ylacetyl-myo-inositol galactoside synthase, UDP-galactose:indol-3-ylacetyl-myo-inositol, and 5-O-D-galactosyltransferase.
