= Ganglioside galactosyltransferase =

Class of enzymes

ganglioside galactosyltransferase

Identifiers
- EC no.: 2.4.1.62
- CAS no.: 37217-28-0

Databases
- IntEnz: IntEnz view
- BRENDA: BRENDA entry
- ExPASy: NiceZyme view
- KEGG: KEGG entry
- MetaCyc: metabolic pathway
- PRIAM: profile
- PDB structures: RCSB PDB PDBe PDBsum
- Gene Ontology: AmiGO / QuickGO
Search
- PMC: articles
- PubMed: articles
- NCBI: proteins

In enzymology, a ganglioside galactosyltransferase (EC 2.4.1.62) is an enzyme that catalyzes the chemical reaction

UDP-galactose + N-acetyl-D-galactosaminyl-(N-acetylneuraminyl)-D-galactosyl-1,4-beta-D-glucosyl-N-acylsphingosine $\rightleftharpoons$ UDP + D-galactosyl-1,3-beta-N-acetyl-D-galactosaminyl-(N-acetylneuraminyl)-D-galactosyl-D-glucosyl-N-acylsphingosine

The 2 substrates of this enzyme are UDP-galactose and N-acetyl-D-galactosaminyl-(N-acetylneuraminyl)-D-galactosyl-1,4-beta-D-glucosyl-N-acylsphingosine, whereas its 2 products are UDP and D-galactosyl-1,3-beta-N-acetyl-D-galactosaminyl-(N-acetylneuraminyl)-D-galactosyl-D-glucosyl-N-acylsphingosine.

This enzyme belongs to the family of glycosyltransferases, specifically the hexosyltransferases. The systematic name of this enzyme class is UDP-galactose:N-acetyl-D-galactosaminyl-(N-acetylneuraminyl)-D-galac tosyl-D-glucosyl-N-acylsphingosine beta-1,3-D-galactosyltransferase. Other names in common use include UDP-galactose-ceramide galactosyltransferase, uridine diphosphogalactose-ceramide galactosyltransferase, UDP galactose-LAC Tet-ceramide alpha-galactosyltransferase, UDP-galactose-GM2 galactosyltransferase, uridine diphosphogalactose-GM2 galactosyltransferase, uridine diphosphate D-galactose:glycolipid galactosyltransferase, UDP-galactose:N-acetylgalactosaminyl-(N-acetylneuraminyl), galactosyl-glucosyl-ceramide galactosyltransferase, UDP-galactose-GM2 ganglioside galactosyltransferase, and GM1-synthase. This enzyme participates in glycosphingolipid biosynthesis - ganglioseries and glycan structures - biosynthesis 2.
