= Lactosylceramide beta-1,3-galactosyltransferase =

Class of enzymes

lactosylceramide beta-1,3-galactosyltransferase

Identifiers
- EC no.: 2.4.1.179
- CAS no.: 106769-64-6

Databases
- IntEnz: IntEnz view
- BRENDA: BRENDA entry
- ExPASy: NiceZyme view
- KEGG: KEGG entry
- MetaCyc: metabolic pathway
- PRIAM: profile
- PDB structures: RCSB PDB PDBe PDBsum
- Gene Ontology: AmiGO / QuickGO
Search
- PMC: articles
- PubMed: articles
- NCBI: proteins

In enzymology, a lactosylceramide beta-1,3-galactosyltransferase (EC 2.4.1.179) is an enzyme that catalyzes the chemical reaction

UDP-galactose + D-galactosyl-1,4-beta-D-glucosyl-R $\rightleftharpoons$ UDP + D-galactosyl-1,3-beta-D-galactosyl-1,4-beta-D-glucosyl-R

Thus, the two substrates of this enzyme are UDP-galactose and D-galactosyl-1,4-beta-D-glucosyl-R, whereas its two products are UDP and D-galactosyl-1,3-beta-D-galactosyl-1,4-beta-D-glucosyl-R.

This enzyme belongs to the family of glycosyltransferases, specifically the hexosyltransferases. The systematic name of this enzyme class is UDP-galactose:D-galactosyl-1,4-beta-D-glucosyl-R beta-1,3-galactosyltransferase. Other names in common use include uridine diphosphogalactose-lactosylceramide, and beta1->3-galactosyltransferase.
