= B3GNT2 =

Protein-coding gene in humans

Identifiers
- Aliases: B3GNT2, B3GN-T2, B3GNT, B3GNT-2, B3GNT1, BETA3GNT, BGNT2, BGnT-2, 3-Gn-T1, 3-Gn-T2, beta-1, beta3Gn-T1, beta3Gn-T2, UDP-GlcNAc:betaGal beta-1,3-N-acetylglucosaminyltransferase 2
- External IDs: OMIM: 605581; MGI: 1889505; GeneCards: B3GNT2
Enzyme activity
EC #	BRENDA	ExPASy	KEGG	MetaCyc
2.4.1.149	↗	↗	↗	↗

Gene location (Human)
Chr.	Chromosome 2 (human)
Band	2p15	Start	62,196,115 bp
Band	2p15	End	62,224,731 bp

Gene location (Mouse)
Chr.	Chromosome 11 (mouse)
Band	11 A3.2|11 14.22 cM	Start	22,709,738 bp
Band	11 A3.2|11 14.22 cM	End	22,810,961 bp
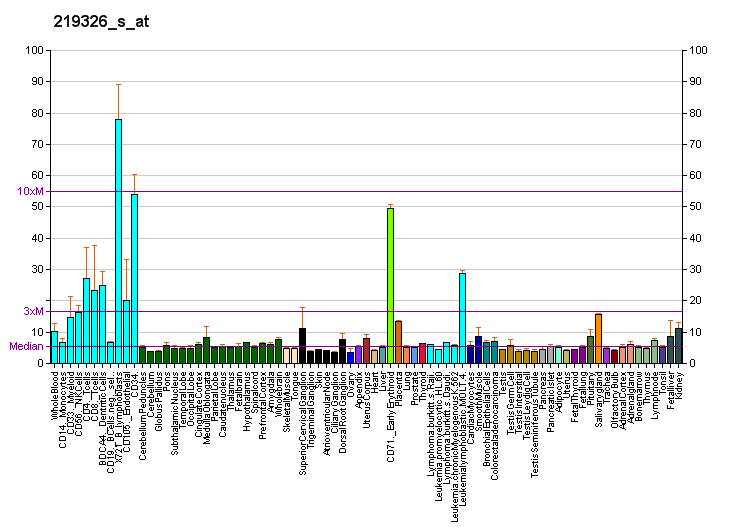
RNA expression pattern
Bgee	Human / Mouse (ortholog); Top expressed in: secondary oocyte; visceral pleura; epithelium of nasopharynx; germinal epithelium; lower lobe of lung; parietal pleura; mucosa of paranasal sinus; jejunal mucosa; mucosa of sigmoid colon; gingival epithelium / Top expressed in: primary oocyte; secondary oocyte; granulocyte; zygote; striatum of neuraxis; adrenal gland; genital tubercle; proximal tubule; right kidney; tail of embryo; More reference expression data
BioGPS	More reference expression data
Gene ontology
Molecular function	transferase activity; glycosyltransferase activity; galactosyltransferase activity; N-acetyllactosaminide beta-1,3-N-acetylglucosaminyltransferase activity; UDP-galactose:beta-N-acetylglucosamine beta-1,3-galactosyltransferase activity; acetylgalactosaminyltransferase activity; protein binding
Cellular component	integral component of membrane; Golgi apparatus; membrane; Golgi membrane; endoplasmic reticulum
Biological process	poly-N-acetyllactosamine biosynthetic process; axon guidance; protein glycosylation; sensory perception of smell; O-glycan processing; keratan sulfate biosynthetic process; cellular response to leukemia inhibitory factor
Sources:Amigo / QuickGO
Orthologs
Databases	NCBI: entry; OMA: entry
Species	Human	Mouse
Entrez	10678	53625
Ensembl	ENSG00000170340	ENSMUSG00000051650
UniProt	Q9NY97	Q9Z222
RefSeq (mRNA)	NM_006577; NM_033252; NM_001319075; NM_018554	NM_001169114; NM_016888
RefSeq (protein)	NP_001306004; NP_006568	NP_001162585; NP_058584
Location (UCSC)	Chr 2: 62.2 – 62.22 Mb	Chr 11: 22.71 – 22.81 Mb
PubMed search
- Wikidata
View/Edit Human	View/Edit Mouse

UDP-GlcNAc:betaGal beta-1,3-N-acetylglucosaminyltransferase 2 is an enzyme that in humans is encoded by the B3GNT2 gene.

This gene encodes a member of the beta-1,3-N-acetylglucosaminyltransferase family. This enzyme is a type II transmembrane protein. It prefers the substrate of lacto-N-neotetraose, and is involved in the biosynthesis of poly-N-acetyllactosamine chains.
