= B-N-acetylglucosaminyl-glycopeptide b-1,4-galactosyltransferase =

Class of enzymes

Beta-N-acetylglucosaminylglycopeptide beta-1,4-galactosyltransferase

Identifiers
- EC no.: 2.4.1.38
- CAS no.: 37237-43-7

Databases
- IntEnz: IntEnz view
- BRENDA: BRENDA entry
- ExPASy: NiceZyme view
- KEGG: KEGG entry
- MetaCyc: metabolic pathway
- PRIAM: profile
- PDB structures: RCSB PDB PDBe PDBsum
Search
- PMC: articles
- PubMed: articles
- NCBI: proteins

B-N-acetylglucosaminyl-glycopeptide b-1,4-galactosyltransferase is a galactosyltransferase.

It is classified under EC 2.4.1.38.

== Genes ==
- B4GALT1, B4GALT2, B4GALT3, B4GALT4, B4GALT5, B4GALT6
