= GALNT2 =

Protein-coding gene in humans

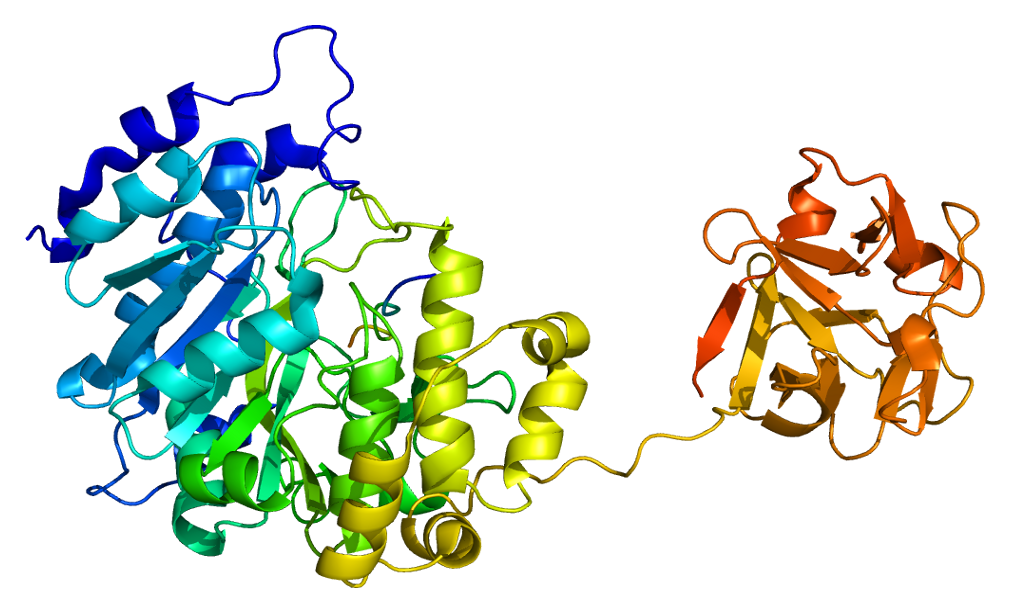

Identifiers
- Aliases: GALNT2, GalNAc-T2, polypeptide N-acetylgalactosaminyltransferase 2, CDG2T
- External IDs: OMIM: 602274; MGI: 894694; GeneCards: GALNT2
Available structures
PDB	Ortholog search: PDBe RCSB
PDB	List of PDB id codes 2FFU, 2FFV, 4D0T, 4D0Z, 4D11, 5AJN, 5AJO, 5AJP, 5FV9
Enzyme activity
EC #	BRENDA	ExPASy	KEGG	MetaCyc
2.4.1.41	↗	↗	↗	↗

Gene location (Human)
Chr.	Chromosome 1 (human)
Band	1q42.13	Start	230,057,990 bp
Band	1q42.13	End	230,282,122 bp

Gene location (Mouse)
Chr.	Chromosome 8 (mouse)
Band	8|8 E2	Start	124,958,130 bp
Band	8|8 E2	End	125,072,463 bp
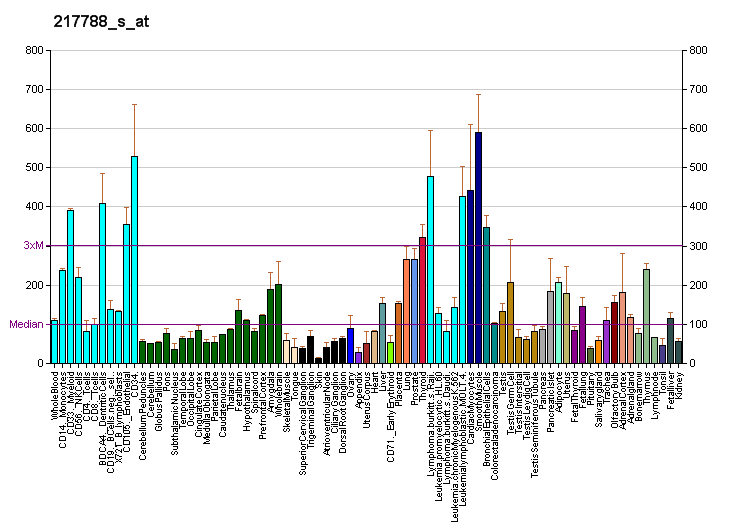

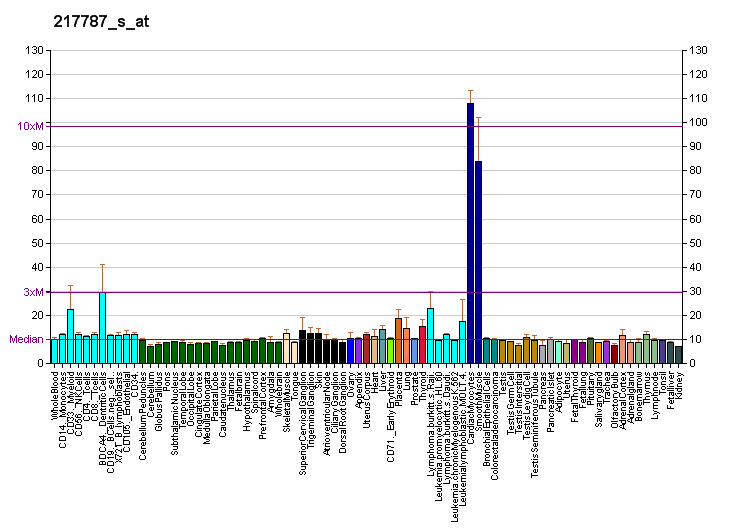
RNA expression pattern
Bgee	Human / Mouse (ortholog); Top expressed in: Descending thoracic aorta; ascending aorta; cartilage tissue; gastric mucosa; right coronary artery; stromal cell of endometrium; body of pancreas; palpebral conjunctiva; right lobe of liver; left coronary artery / Top expressed in: lens; yolk sac; pancreas; stomach; islet of Langerhans; proximal tubule; neural tube; mesencephalon; skeletal muscle tissue; right kidney; More reference expression data
BioGPS	More reference expression data
Gene ontology
Molecular function	transferase activity; manganese ion binding; glycosyltransferase activity; metal ion binding; protein binding; carbohydrate binding; polypeptide N-acetylgalactosaminyltransferase activity
Cellular component	integral component of membrane; integral component of Golgi membrane; Golgi apparatus; membrane; Golgi membrane; extracellular region; Golgi cisterna membrane; perinuclear region of cytoplasm; Golgi stack; extracellular exosome; endoplasmic reticulum membrane
Biological process	protein O-linked glycosylation via serine; protein glycosylation; protein O-linked glycosylation via threonine; O-glycan processing; protein O-linked glycosylation
Sources:Amigo / QuickGO
Orthologs
Databases	NCBI: entry; OMA: entry
Species	Human	Mouse
Entrez	2590	108148
Ensembl	ENSG00000143641	ENSMUSG00000089704
UniProt	Q10471	Q6PB93
RefSeq (mRNA)	NM_001291866; NM_004481	NM_139272
RefSeq (protein)	NP_001278795; NP_004472	NP_644678
Location (UCSC)	Chr 1: 230.06 – 230.28 Mb	Chr 8: 124.96 – 125.07 Mb
PubMed search
- Wikidata
View/Edit Human	View/Edit Mouse

Polypeptide N-acetylgalactosaminyltransferase 2 is an enzyme that in humans is encoded by the GALNT2 gene.

This gene encodes polypeptide N-acetylgalactosaminyltransferase 2, a member of the GalNAc-transferases family. This family transfers an N-acetyl galactosamine to the hydroxyl group of a serine or threonine residue in the first step of O-linked oligosaccharide biosynthesis. The localization site of this particular enzyme is preponderantly the trans-Golgi. Individual GalNAc-transferases have distinct activities, and initiation of O-glycosylation in a cell is regulated by a repertoire of GalNAc-transferases.
