= GALNT1 =

Protein-coding gene in the species Homo sapiens

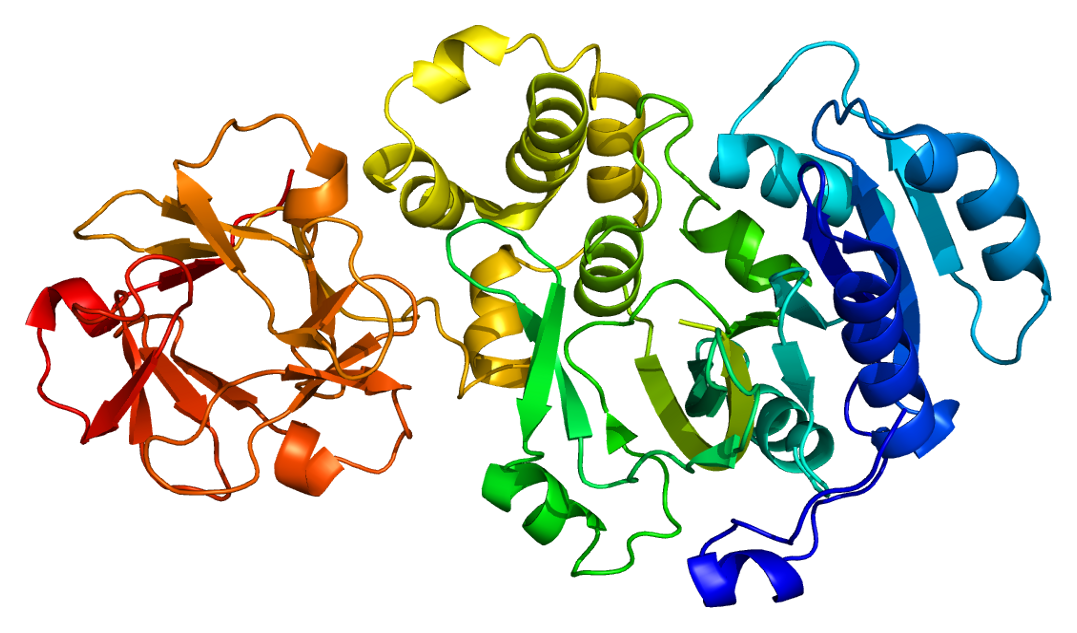

Identifiers
- Aliases: GALNT1, GALNAC-T1, polypeptide N-acetylgalactosaminyltransferase 1
- External IDs: OMIM: 602273; MGI: 894693; GeneCards: GALNT1
Available structures
PDB	Ortholog search: PDBe RCSB
PDB	List of PDB id codes 1XHB
Enzyme activity
EC #	BRENDA	ExPASy	KEGG	MetaCyc
2.4.1.41	↗	↗	↗	↗

Gene location (Human)
Chr.	Chromosome 18 (human)
Band	18q12.2	Start	35,581,117 bp
Band	18q12.2	End	35,711,834 bp

Gene location (Mouse)
Chr.	Chromosome 18 (mouse)
Band	18|18 A2	Start	24,338,401 bp
Band	18|18 A2	End	24,419,875 bp
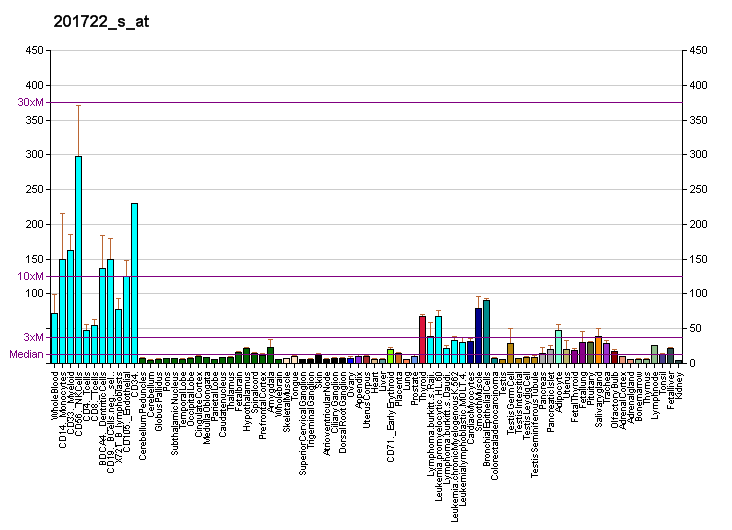

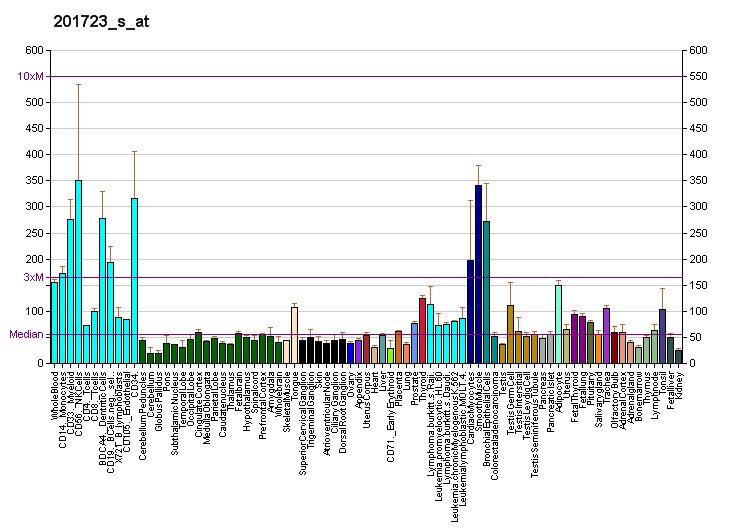

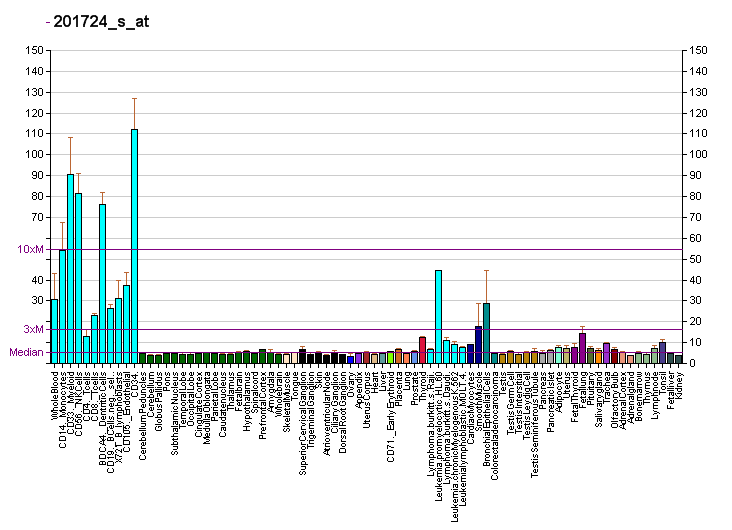
RNA expression pattern
Bgee	Human / Mouse (ortholog); Top expressed in: buccal mucosa cell; mucosa of pharynx; nipple; amniotic fluid; oral cavity; tibia; superior surface of tongue; lactiferous duct; retinal pigment epithelium; periodontal fiber / Top expressed in: endothelial cell of lymphatic vessel; molar; blood; proximal tubule; right kidney; cardiac muscle tissue of left ventricle; parotid gland; decidua; fossa; ciliary body; More reference expression data
BioGPS	More reference expression data
Gene ontology
Molecular function	glycosyltransferase activity; polypeptide N-acetylgalactosaminyltransferase activity; transferase activity; manganese ion binding; metal ion binding; carbohydrate binding
Cellular component	perinuclear region of cytoplasm; integral component of membrane; extracellular region; Golgi cisterna membrane; Golgi membrane; Golgi apparatus; membrane; endoplasmic reticulum membrane
Biological process	protein glycosylation; protein O-linked glycosylation via serine; protein O-linked glycosylation via threonine; O-glycan processing; protein O-linked glycosylation
Sources:Amigo / QuickGO
Orthologs
Databases	NCBI: entry; OMA: entry
Species	Human	Mouse
Entrez	2589	14423
Ensembl	ENSG00000141429	ENSMUSG00000000420
UniProt	Q10472	O08912
RefSeq (mRNA)	NM_020474	NM_001160404; NM_013814; NM_001361200
RefSeq (protein)	NP_065207	NP_001153876; NP_038842; NP_001348129
Location (UCSC)	Chr 18: 35.58 – 35.71 Mb	Chr 18: 24.34 – 24.42 Mb
PubMed search
- Wikidata
View/Edit Human	View/Edit Mouse

Polypeptide N-acetylgalactosaminyltransferase 1 is an enzyme that in humans is encoded by the GALNT1 gene.

This gene encodes a member of the UDP-N-acetyl-alpha-D-galactosamine:polypeptide N-acetylgalactosaminyltransferase (GalNAc-T) family of enzymes. GalNAc-Ts initiate mucin-type O-linked glycosylation in the Golgi apparatus by catalyzing the transfer of GalNAc to serine and threonine residues on target proteins. They are characterized by an N-terminal transmembrane domain, a stem region, a lumenal catalytic domain containing a GT1 motif and Gal/GalNAc transferase motif, and a C-terminal ricin/lectin-like domain. GalNAc-Ts have different, but overlapping, substrate specificities and patterns of expression. Transcript variants derived from this gene that utilize alternative polyA signals have been described in the literature.
