= GALNT13 =

Protein-coding gene in the species Homo sapiens

Identifiers
- Aliases: GALNT13, GalNAc-T13, polypeptide N-acetylgalactosaminyltransferase 13
- External IDs: OMIM: 608369; MGI: 2139447; GeneCards: GALNT13
Enzyme activity
EC #	BRENDA	ExPASy	KEGG	MetaCyc
2.4.1.41	↗	↗	↗	↗

Gene location (Human)
Chr.	Chromosome 2 (human)
Band	2q23.3-q24.1	Start	153,871,922 bp
Band	2q23.3-q24.1	End	154,453,979 bp

Gene location (Mouse)
Chr.	Chromosome 2 (mouse)
Band	2|2 C1.1	Start	54,436,317 bp
Band	2|2 C1.1	End	55,118,309 bp
RNA expression pattern
Bgee	Human / Mouse (ortholog); Top expressed in: cerebellar cortex; cerebellar hemisphere; right hemisphere of cerebellum; gonad; corpus callosum; testicle; C1 segment; Achilles tendon; secondary oocyte; cerebellar vermis / Top expressed in: lobe of cerebellum; habenula; cerebellar vermis; dorsal striatum; lumbar spinal ganglion; olfactory tubercle; lateral septal nucleus; nucleus accumbens; substantia nigra; neural layer of retina; More reference expression data
BioGPS	n/a
Gene ontology
Molecular function	glycosyltransferase activity; transferase activity; metal ion binding; carbohydrate binding; polypeptide N-acetylgalactosaminyltransferase activity
Cellular component	integral component of membrane; Golgi membrane; Golgi apparatus; membrane
Biological process	protein glycosylation; O-glycan processing; protein O-linked glycosylation; protein O-linked glycosylation via serine; protein O-linked glycosylation via threonine
Sources:Amigo / QuickGO
Orthologs
Databases	NCBI: entry; OMA: entry
Species	Human	Mouse
Entrez	114805	271786
Ensembl	ENSG00000144278	ENSMUSG00000060988
UniProt	Q8IUC8	Q8CF93
RefSeq (mRNA)	NM_001301627; NM_052917	NM_173030
RefSeq (protein)	NP_001288556; NP_443149; NP_001363321; NP_001363323; NP_001363327 NP_001363329; NP_001363330; NP_001363331; NP_001363332; NP_001363333; NP_001363334	NP_766618
Location (UCSC)	Chr 2: 153.87 – 154.45 Mb	Chr 2: 54.44 – 55.12 Mb
PubMed search
- Wikidata
View/Edit Human	View/Edit Mouse

Polypeptide N-acetylgalactosaminyltransferase 13 is an enzyme that in humans is encoded by the GALNT13 gene.

The GALNT13 protein is a member of the UDP-N-acetyl-alpha-D-galactosamine:polypeptide N-acetylgalactosaminyltransferase (GalNAcT; EC 2.4.1.41) family, which initiate O-linked glycosylation of mucins (see MUC3A, MIM 158371) by the initial transfer of N-acetylgalactosamine (GalNAc) with an alpha-linkage to a serine or threonine residue.[supplied by OMIM]
