= B3GNT7 =

Protein-coding gene in humans

Identifiers
- Aliases: B3GNT7, beta3GnT7, UDP-GlcNAc:betaGal beta-1,3-N-acetylglucosaminyltransferase 7
- External IDs: OMIM: 615313; MGI: 2384394; GeneCards: B3GNT7

Gene location (Human)
Chr.	Chromosome 2 (human)
Band	2q37.1|2q37.1	Start	231,395,710 bp
Band	2q37.1|2q37.1	End	231,401,164 bp

Gene location (Mouse)
Chr.	Chromosome 1 (mouse)
Band	1|1 C5	Start	86,230,554 bp
Band	1|1 C5	End	86,235,027 bp
RNA expression pattern
Bgee	Human / Mouse (ortholog); Top expressed in: nasal epithelium; mucosa of sigmoid colon; rectum; tendon of biceps brachii; olfactory zone of nasal mucosa; cartilage tissue; bronchial epithelial cell; duodenum; epithelium of nasopharynx; mucosa of transverse colon / Top expressed in: left colon; epiblast; embryo; duodenum; tail of embryo; blastocyst; embryo; zygote; seminal vesicula; secondary oocyte; More reference expression data
BioGPS	n/a
Gene ontology
Molecular function	glycosyltransferase activity; transferase activity; galactosyltransferase activity; N-acetyllactosaminide beta-1,3-N-acetylglucosaminyltransferase activity; UDP-galactose:beta-N-acetylglucosamine beta-1,3-galactosyltransferase activity; acetylgalactosaminyltransferase activity
Cellular component	integral component of membrane; Golgi membrane; Golgi apparatus; membrane; endoplasmic reticulum
Biological process	protein glycosylation; keratan sulfate biosynthetic process; O-glycan processing; poly-N-acetyllactosamine biosynthetic process
Sources:Amigo / QuickGO
Orthologs
Databases	NCBI: entry; OMA: entry
Species	Human	Mouse
Entrez	93010	227327
Ensembl	ENSG00000156966	ENSMUSG00000079445
UniProt	Q8NFL0	Q8K0J2
RefSeq (mRNA)	NM_145236	NM_145222
RefSeq (protein)	NP_660279	NP_660257
Location (UCSC)	Chr 2: 231.4 – 231.4 Mb	Chr 1: 86.23 – 86.24 Mb
PubMed search
- Wikidata
View/Edit Human	View/Edit Mouse

UDP-GlcNAc:betaGal beta-1,3-N-acetylglucosaminyltransferase 7 is a protein in humans that is encoded by the B3GNT7 gene.
