= B4GALNT2 =

Protein-coding gene in the species Homo sapiens

Identifiers
- Aliases: B4GALNT2, B4GALT, GALGT2, beta-1,4-N-acetyl-galactosaminyltransferase 2
- External IDs: OMIM: 111730; MGI: 1342058; GeneCards: B4GALNT2
Enzyme activity
EC #	BRENDA	ExPASy	KEGG	MetaCyc
2.4.1.165	↗	↗	↗	↗

Gene location (Human)
Chr.	Chromosome 17 (human)
Band	17q21.32	Start	49,132,460 bp
Band	17q21.32	End	49,176,840 bp

Gene location (Mouse)
Chr.	Chromosome 11 (mouse)
Band	11 D|11 59.02 cM	Start	95,756,769 bp
Band	11 D|11 59.02 cM	End	95,805,717 bp
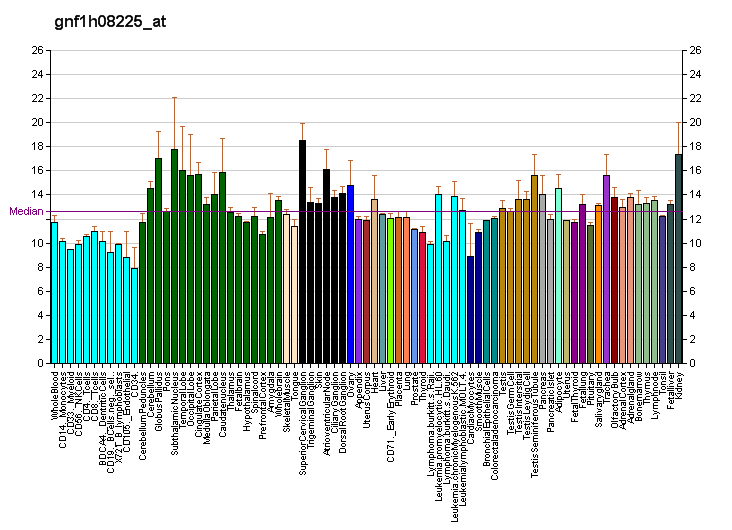
RNA expression pattern
Bgee	Human / Mouse (ortholog); Top expressed in: mucosa of transverse colon; rectum; appendix; body of stomach; gonad; epithelium of colon; human kidney; left lobe of thyroid gland; right lobe of thyroid gland; gallbladder / Top expressed in: duodenum; crypt of lieberkuhn of small intestine; yolk sac; parotid gland; jejunum; intestinal villus; ileum; Paneth cell; muscle of thigh; left colon; More reference expression data
BioGPS	More reference expression data
Gene ontology
Molecular function	transferase activity; hexosyltransferase activity; glycosyltransferase activity; acetylgalactosaminyltransferase activity
Cellular component	integral component of membrane; integral component of Golgi membrane; Golgi apparatus; membrane; Golgi membrane
Biological process	UDP-N-acetylglucosamine metabolic process; protein glycosylation; UDP-N-acetylgalactosamine metabolic process; lipid glycosylation; negative regulation of cell-cell adhesion; protein N-linked glycosylation via asparagine
Sources:Amigo / QuickGO
Orthologs
Databases	NCBI: entry; OMA: entry
Species	Human	Mouse
Entrez	124872	14422
Ensembl	ENSG00000167080	ENSMUSG00000013418
UniProt	Q8NHY0	Q09199
RefSeq (mRNA)	NM_001159387; NM_001159388; NM_153446	NM_008081
RefSeq (protein)	NP_001152859; NP_001152860; NP_703147	NP_032107
Location (UCSC)	Chr 17: 49.13 – 49.18 Mb	Chr 11: 95.76 – 95.81 Mb
PubMed search
- Wikidata
View/Edit Human	View/Edit Mouse

Beta-1,4 N-acetylgalactosaminyltransferase 2 is an enzyme that in humans is encoded by the B4GALNT2 gene.
