= GALNT6 =

Protein-coding gene in humans

Identifiers
- Aliases: GALNT6, GALNAC-T6, GalNAcT6, polypeptide N-acetylgalactosaminyltransferase 6
- External IDs: OMIM: 605148; MGI: 1891640; GeneCards: GALNT6
Enzyme activity
EC #	BRENDA	ExPASy	KEGG	MetaCyc
2.4.1.41	↗	↗	↗	↗

Gene location (Human)
Chr.	Chromosome 12 (human)
Band	12q13.13	Start	51,351,247 bp
Band	12q13.13	End	51,392,867 bp
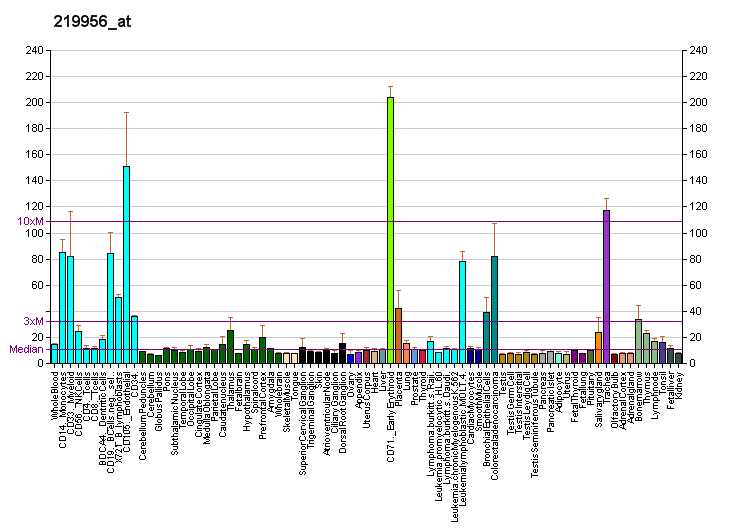
RNA expression pattern
Bgee	Human / Mouse (ortholog); Top expressed in: parotid gland; trachea; corpus epididymis; bronchial epithelial cell; pylorus; jejunal mucosa; duodenum; stromal cell of endometrium; monocyte; corpus callosum / n/a; More reference expression data
BioGPS	More reference expression data
Gene ontology
Molecular function	carbohydrate binding; glycosyltransferase activity; metal ion binding; transferase activity; polypeptide N-acetylgalactosaminyltransferase activity
Cellular component	membrane; perinuclear region of cytoplasm; Golgi membrane; integral component of membrane; Golgi apparatus
Biological process	O-glycan processing; protein O-linked glycosylation; protein glycosylation
Sources:Amigo / QuickGO
Orthologs
Databases	NCBI: entry; OMA: entry
Species	Human	Mouse
Entrez	11226	207839
Ensembl	ENSG00000139629	n/a
UniProt	Q8NCL4	Q8C7U7
RefSeq (mRNA)	NM_007210	NM_001161767; NM_001161768; NM_172451
RefSeq (protein)	NP_009141	NP_001155239; NP_001155240; NP_766039
Location (UCSC)	Chr 12: 51.35 – 51.39 Mb	n/a
PubMed search
- Wikidata
View/Edit Human	View/Edit Mouse

Polypeptide N-acetylgalactosaminyltransferase 6 is an enzyme that in humans is encoded by the GALNT6 gene.

This gene encodes a member of the UDP-N-acetyl-alpha-D-galactosamine:polypeptide N-acetylgalactosaminyltransferase (GalNAc-T) family of enzymes. GalNAc-Ts initiate mucin-type O-linked glycosylation in the Golgi apparatus by catalyzing the transfer of GalNAc to serine and threonine residues on target proteins. They are characterized by an N-terminal transmembrane domain, a stem region, a lumenal catalytic domain containing a GT1 motif and Gal/GalNAc transferase motif, and a C-terminal ricin/lectin-like domain. GalNAc-Ts have different, but overlapping, substrate specificities and patterns of expression. The encoded protein is capable of glycosylating fibronectin peptide in vitro and is expressed in a fibroblast cell line, indicating that it may be involved in the synthesis of oncofetal fibronectin.
