= B4GALT5 =

Protein-coding gene in the species Homo sapiens

Identifiers
- Aliases: B4GALT5, B4Gal-T5, BETA4-GALT-IV, beta4Gal-T5, beta4GalT-V, gt-V, beta-1,4-galactosyltransferase 5
- External IDs: OMIM: 604016; MGI: 1927169; GeneCards: B4GALT5
Enzyme activity
EC #	BRENDA	ExPASy	KEGG	MetaCyc
2.4.1.274	↗	↗	↗	↗

Gene location (Human)
Chr.	Chromosome 20 (human)
Band	20q13.13	Start	49,632,945 bp
Band	20q13.13	End	49,713,878 bp

Gene location (Mouse)
Chr.	Chromosome 2 (mouse)
Band	2|2 H3	Start	167,140,364 bp
Band	2|2 H3	End	167,191,103 bp
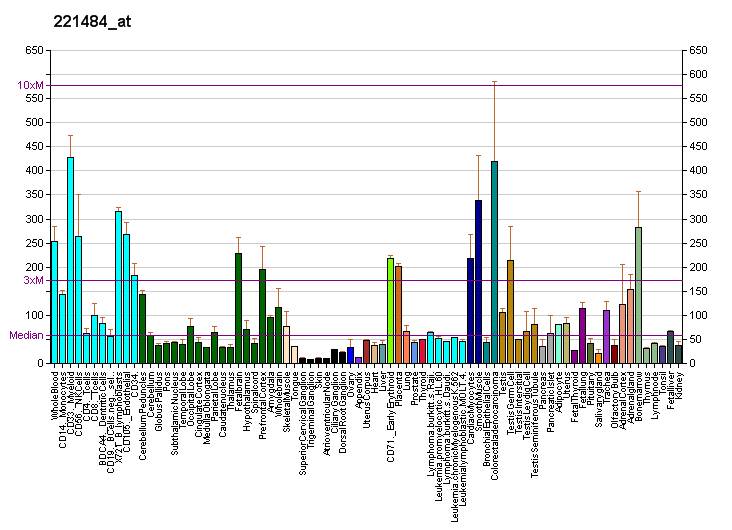

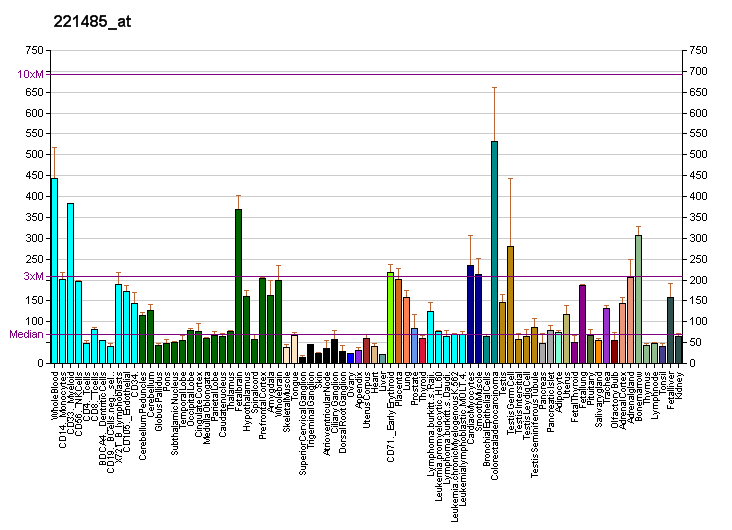
RNA expression pattern
Bgee	Human / Mouse (ortholog); Top expressed in: nasal epithelium; palpebral conjunctiva; trachea; trabecular bone; pericardium; mucosa of urinary bladder; tibialis anterior muscle; secondary oocyte; pancreatic ductal cell; olfactory zone of nasal mucosa / Top expressed in: gastrula; yolk sac; zygote; decidua; right kidney; proximal tubule; tail of embryo; genital tubercle; secondary oocyte; spermatocyte; More reference expression data
BioGPS	More reference expression data
Gene ontology
Molecular function	glycosyltransferase activity; transferase activity; galactosyltransferase activity; metal ion binding; beta-N-acetylglucosaminylglycopeptide beta-1,4-galactosyltransferase activity; N-acetyllactosamine synthase activity; UDP-galactose:glucosylceramide beta-1,4-galactosyltransferase activity
Cellular component	integral component of membrane; Golgi cisterna membrane; Golgi membrane; Golgi apparatus; membrane
Biological process	protein glycosylation; keratan sulfate biosynthetic process; O-glycan processing; carbohydrate metabolic process; poly-N-acetyllactosamine biosynthetic process; ganglioside biosynthetic process via lactosylceramide; central nervous system neuron axonogenesis; central nervous system myelination; regulation of protein stability; positive regulation of embryonic development; neuron maturation; lipid metabolism; sphingolipid metabolic process
Sources:Amigo / QuickGO
Orthologs
Databases	NCBI: entry; OMA: entry
Species	Human	Mouse
Entrez	9334	56336
Ensembl	ENSG00000158470	ENSMUSG00000017929
UniProt	O43286	Q9JMK0
RefSeq (mRNA)	NM_004776	NM_019835
RefSeq (protein)	NP_004767	NP_062809
Location (UCSC)	Chr 20: 49.63 – 49.71 Mb	Chr 2: 167.14 – 167.19 Mb
PubMed search
- Wikidata
View/Edit Human	View/Edit Mouse

Beta-1,4-galactosyltransferase 5 is an enzyme that in humans is encoded by the B4GALT5 gene.

This gene is one of seven beta-1,4-galactosyltransferase (beta4GalT) genes. They encode type II membrane-bound glycoproteins that appear to have exclusive specificity for the donor substrate UDP-galactose; all transfer galactose in a beta1,4 linkage to similar acceptor sugars: GlcNAc, Glc, and Xyl. Each beta4GalT has a distinct function in the biosynthesis of different glycoconjugates and saccharide structures. As type II membrane proteins, they have an N-terminal hydrophobic signal sequence that directs the protein to the Golgi apparatus and which then remains uncleaved to function as a transmembrane anchor. By sequence similarity, the beta4GalTs form four groups: beta4GalT1 and beta4GalT2, beta4GalT3 and beta4GalT4, beta4GalT5 and beta4GalT6, and beta4GalT7. The function of the enzyme encoded by this gene is not clear. This gene was previously designated as B4GALT4 but was renamed to B4GALT5. In the literature it is also referred to as beta4GalT2.

== Bibliography ==
- Amado M, Almeida R, Schwientek T, Clausen H (2000). "Identification and characterization of large galactosyltransferase gene families: galactosyltransferases for all functions". Biochim. Biophys. Acta. 1473 (1): 35–53. doi:10.1016/S0304-4165(99)00168-3. PMID 10580128.
- Sato T, Aoki N, Matsuda T, Furukawa K (1998). "Differential effect of alpha-lactalbumin on beta-1,4-galactosyltransferase IV activities". Biochem. Biophys. Res. Commun. 244 (3): 637–41. doi:10.1006/bbrc.1998.8327. PMID 9535717.
- Deloukas P, Matthews LH, Ashurst J, et al. (2002). "The DNA sequence and comparative analysis of human chromosome 20". Nature. 414 (6866): 865–71. Bibcode:2001Natur.414..865D. doi:10.1038/414865a. PMID 11780052.
- Jia L, Young MF, Powell J, et al. (2002). "Gene expression profile of human bone marrow stromal cells: high-throughput expressed sequence tag sequencing analysis". Genomics. 79 (1): 7–17. doi:10.1006/geno.2001.6683. PMID 11827452.
- Xu S, Zhang S, Chen C, et al. (2003). "Over-expression of beta-1,4-galactosyltransferase V increases the growth of astrocytoma cell line". J. Exp. Clin. Cancer Res. 21 (3): 409–14. PMID 12385586.
- Strausberg RL, Feingold EA, Grouse LH, et al. (2003). "Generation and initial analysis of more than 15,000 full-length human and mouse cDNA sequences". Proc. Natl. Acad. Sci. U.S.A. 99 (26): 16899–903. Bibcode:2002PNAS...9916899M. doi:10.1073/pnas.242603899. PMC 139241. PMID 12477932.
- Ota T, Suzuki Y, Nishikawa T, et al. (2004). "Complete sequencing and characterization of 21,243 full-length human cDNAs". Nat. Genet. 36 (1): 40–5. doi:10.1038/ng1285. PMID 14702039.
- Sato T, Furukawa K (2004). "Transcriptional regulation of the human beta-1,4-galactosyltransferase V gene in cancer cells: essential role of transcription factor Sp1". J. Biol. Chem. 279 (38): 39574–83. doi:10.1074/jbc.M405805200. PMID 15263012.
- Gerhard DS, Wagner L, Feingold EA, et al. (2004). "The Status, Quality, and Expansion of the NIH Full-Length cDNA Project: The Mammalian Gene Collection (MGC)". Genome Res. 14 (10B): 2121–7. doi:10.1101/gr.2596504. PMC 528928. PMID 15489334.
- Jiang J, Chen X, Shen J, et al. (2006). "Beta1,4-galactosyltransferase V functions as a positive growth regulator in glioma". J. Biol. Chem. 281 (14): 9482–9. doi:10.1074/jbc.M504489200. PMID 16461357.
- Sato T, Furukawa K (2007). "Sequential action of Ets-1 and Sp1 in the activation of the human beta-1,4-galactosyltransferase V gene involved in abnormal glycosylation characteristic of cancer cells". J. Biol. Chem. 282 (38): 27702–12. doi:10.1074/jbc.M611862200. PMID 17656364.
- Kitayama K, Hayashida Y, Nishida K, Akama TO (2007). "Enzymes responsible for synthesis of corneal keratan sulfate glycosaminoglycans". J. Biol. Chem. 282 (41): 30085–96. doi:10.1074/jbc.M703695200. PMID 17690104.
