= Glucuronosyl-N-acetylgalactosaminyl-proteoglycan 4-b-N-acetylgalactosaminyltransferase =

Class of enzymes

Glucuronosyl-N-acetylgalactosaminyl-proteoglycan 4-beta-N-acetylgalactosaminyltransferase

Identifiers
- EC no.: 2.4.1.175
- CAS no.: 96189-40-1

Databases
- IntEnz: IntEnz view
- BRENDA: BRENDA entry
- ExPASy: NiceZyme view
- KEGG: KEGG entry
- MetaCyc: metabolic pathway
- PRIAM: profile
- PDB structures: RCSB PDB PDBe PDBsum
Search
- PMC: articles
- PubMed: articles
- NCBI: proteins

Glucuronosyl-N-acetylgalactosaminyl-proteoglycan 4-beta-N-acetylgalactosaminyltransferase (EC 2.4.1.175, N-acetylgalactosaminyltransferase II, UDP-N-acetyl-D-galactosamine:D-glucuronyl-N-acetyl-1,3-beta-D-galactosaminylproteoglycan beta-1,4-N-acetylgalactosaminyltransferase, chondroitin synthase, glucuronyl-N-acetylgalactosaminylproteoglycan beta-1,4-N-acetylgalactosaminyltransferase, uridine diphosphoacetylgalactosamine-chondroitin acetylgalactosaminyltransferase II) is an enzyme with systematic name UDP-N-acetyl-D-galactosamine:beta-D-glucuronosyl-(1->3)-N-acetyl-beta-D-galactosaminyl-proteoglycan 4-beta-N-acetylgalactosaminyltransferase. This enzyme catalyses the following chemical reaction

UDP-N-acetyl-D-galactosamine + beta-D-glucuronosyl-(1->3)-N-acetyl-beta-D-galactosaminyl-proteoglycan $\rightleftharpoons$ UDP + N-acetyl-beta-D-galactosaminyl-(1->4)-beta-D-glucuronosyl-(1->3)-N-acetyl-beta-D-galactosaminyl-proteoglycan

This enzyme is involved in the biosynthesis of chondroitin sulfate.
