= GALNT15 =

Protein-coding gene in humans

Identifiers
- Aliases: GALNT15, GALNACT15, GALNT13, GALNT7, GALNTL2, PIH5, pp-GalNAc-T15, polypeptide N-acetylgalactosaminyltransferase 15
- External IDs: OMIM: 615131; MGI: 1926004; GeneCards: GALNT15
Enzyme activity
EC #	BRENDA	ExPASy	KEGG	MetaCyc
2.4.1.41	↗	↗	↗	↗

Gene location (Human)
Chr.	Chromosome 3 (human)
Band	3p25.1	Start	16,174,680 bp
Band	3p25.1	End	16,231,992 bp

Gene location (Mouse)
Chr.	Chromosome 14 (mouse)
Band	14|14 B	Start	31,750,946 bp
Band	14|14 B	End	31,784,154 bp
RNA expression pattern
Bgee	Human / Mouse (ortholog); Top expressed in: gastric mucosa; decidua; Achilles tendon; spinal cord; C1 segment; inferior ganglion of vagus nerve; cartilage tissue; pericardium; subcutaneous adipose tissue; corpus callosum / Top expressed in: muscle of thigh; skin of external ear; ankle; uterus; myocardium of ventricle; mammary gland; esophagus; extraocular muscle; tibialis anterior muscle; lumbar subsegment of spinal cord; More reference expression data
BioGPS	n/a
Gene ontology
Molecular function	carbohydrate binding; metal ion binding; glycosyltransferase activity; transferase activity; polypeptide N-acetylgalactosaminyltransferase activity
Cellular component	integral component of membrane; transport vesicle; Golgi apparatus; membrane; Golgi membrane
Biological process	O-glycan processing; protein glycosylation
Sources:Amigo / QuickGO
Orthologs
Databases	NCBI: entry; OMA: entry
Species	Human	Mouse
Entrez	117248	78754
Ensembl	ENSG00000131386	ENSMUSG00000021903
UniProt	Q8N3T1	Q9D2N8
RefSeq (mRNA)	NM_054110; NM_001319051; NM_001319052	NM_030166
RefSeq (protein)	NP_001305980; NP_001305981; NP_473451	NP_084442
Location (UCSC)	Chr 3: 16.17 – 16.23 Mb	Chr 14: 31.75 – 31.78 Mb
PubMed search
- Wikidata
View/Edit Human	View/Edit Mouse

Polypeptide N-acetylgalactosaminyltransferase 15 is an enzyme that in humans is encoded by the GALNT15 gene (previously GALNTL2).
