= GALNT11 =

Protein-coding gene in the species Homo sapiens

Identifiers
- Aliases: GALNT11, GALNACT11, GALNAC-T11, polypeptide N-acetylgalactosaminyltransferase 11
- External IDs: OMIM: 615130; MGI: 2444392; GeneCards: GALNT11
Enzyme activity
EC #	BRENDA	ExPASy	KEGG	MetaCyc
2.4.1.41	↗	↗	↗	↗

Gene location (Human)
Chr.	Chromosome 7 (human)
Band	7q36.1|7q36.1	Start	152,025,674 bp
Band	7q36.1|7q36.1	End	152,122,347 bp

Gene location (Mouse)
Chr.	Chromosome 5 (mouse)
Band	5|5 A3- B1	Start	25,426,902 bp
Band	5|5 A3- B1	End	25,470,916 bp
RNA expression pattern
Bgee	Human / Mouse (ortholog); Top expressed in: Epithelium of choroid plexus; renal medulla; kidney tubule; retinal pigment epithelium; Brodmann area 23; glomerulus; middle temporal gyrus; metanephric glomerulus; lateral nuclear group of thalamus; tibia / Top expressed in: right kidney; proximal tubule; human kidney; vestibular membrane of cochlear duct; vestibular sensory epithelium; decidua; visual cortex; primary visual cortex; yolk sac; condyle; More reference expression data
BioGPS	n/a
Gene ontology
Molecular function	transferase activity; glycosyltransferase activity; metal ion binding; Notch binding; carbohydrate binding; polypeptide N-acetylgalactosaminyltransferase activity
Cellular component	integral component of membrane; Golgi apparatus; membrane; Golgi membrane
Biological process	Notch signaling pathway; cilium assembly; protein glycosylation; protein O-linked glycosylation via threonine; determination of left/right symmetry; O-glycan processing; Notch receptor processing; regulation of Notch signaling pathway; Notch signaling involved in heart development
Sources:Amigo / QuickGO
Orthologs
Databases	NCBI: entry; OMA: entry
Species	Human	Mouse
Entrez	63917	231050
Ensembl	ENSG00000178234	ENSMUSG00000038072
UniProt	Q8NCW6	Q921L8
RefSeq (mRNA)	NM_001304514; NM_022087	NM_144908; NM_001359890
RefSeq (protein)	NP_001291443; NP_071370; NP_001358387; NP_001358388; NP_001358389 NP_001358390; NP_001358391; NP_001358392; NP_001358393; NP_001358394; NP_001358395; NP_001358396; NP_001358397; NP_001358398; NP_001358399; NP_001358400; NP_001358401; NP_001358402; NP_001358403; NP_001358404	NP_659157; NP_001346819
Location (UCSC)	Chr 7: 152.03 – 152.12 Mb	Chr 5: 25.43 – 25.47 Mb
PubMed search
- Wikidata
View/Edit Human	View/Edit Mouse

Polypeptide N-acetylgalactosaminyltransferase 11 is an enzyme that in humans is encoded by the GALNT11 gene.

The GALNT11 gene contains 10 exons. An important paralog of this gene is GALNTL5.
