= Beta-1,3-N-acetylglucosaminyltransferase 3 =

Protein-coding gene in the species Homo sapiens

B3GNT3

Identifiers
- Aliases: B3GNT3, B3GAL-T8, B3GN-T3, B3GNT-3, HP10328, TMEM3, beta3Gn-T3, Beta-1,3-N-acetylglucosaminyltransferase 3, UDP-GlcNAc:betaGal beta-1,3-N-acetylglucosaminyltransferase 3
- External IDs: OMIM: 605863; MGI: 2152535; GeneCards: B3GNT3
Enzyme activity
EC #	BRENDA	ExPASy	KEGG	MetaCyc
2.4.1.146	↗	↗	↗	↗
2.4.1.149	↗	↗	↗	↗

Gene location (Human)
Chr.	Chromosome 19 (human)
Band	19p13.11	Start	17,794,828 bp
Band	19p13.11	End	17,813,576 bp

Gene location (Mouse)
Chr.	Chromosome 8 (mouse)
Band	8|8 B3.3	Start	72,143,400 bp
Band	8|8 B3.3	End	72,154,433 bp
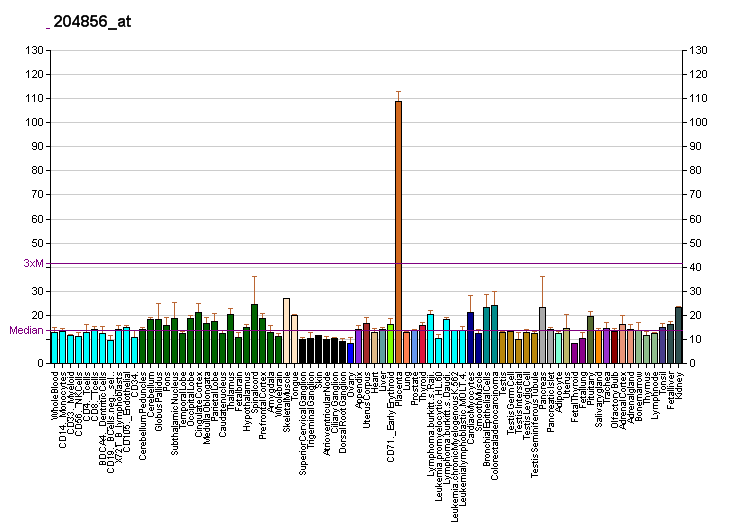
RNA expression pattern
Bgee	Human / Mouse (ortholog); Top expressed in: mucosa of transverse colon; rectum; gallbladder; mucosa of sigmoid colon; duodenum; nasal epithelium; minor salivary glands; olfactory zone of nasal mucosa; body of stomach; jejunal mucosa / Top expressed in: epithelium of stomach; duodenum; pyloric antrum; jejunum; intestinal villus; large intestine; mucous cell of stomach; colon; left colon; ileum; More reference expression data
BioGPS	More reference expression data
Gene ontology
Molecular function	glycosyltransferase activity; beta-1,3-galactosyl-O-glycosyl-glycoprotein beta-1,3-N-acetylglucosaminyltransferase activity; transferase activity; galactosyltransferase activity; UDP-galactose:beta-N-acetylglucosamine beta-1,3-galactosyltransferase activity; N-acetyllactosaminide beta-1,3-N-acetylglucosaminyltransferase activity; acetylgalactosaminyltransferase activity
Cellular component	integral component of membrane; Golgi membrane; Golgi apparatus; integral component of plasma membrane; membrane; endoplasmic reticulum
Biological process	protein glycosylation; poly-N-acetyllactosamine biosynthetic process; keratan sulfate biosynthetic process; O-glycan processing
Sources:Amigo / QuickGO
Orthologs
Databases	NCBI: entry; OMA: entry
Species	Human	Mouse
Entrez	10331	72297
Ensembl	ENSG00000179913	ENSMUSG00000031803
UniProt	Q9Y2A9	Q5JCS9
RefSeq (mRNA)	NM_014256	NM_028189
RefSeq (protein)	NP_055071	NP_082465
Location (UCSC)	Chr 19: 17.79 – 17.81 Mb	Chr 8: 72.14 – 72.15 Mb
PubMed search
- Wikidata
View/Edit Human	View/Edit Mouse

UDP-GlcNAc:betaGal beta-1,3-N-acetylglucosaminyltransferase 3 is an enzyme that in humans is encoded by the B3GNT3 gene.

This gene encodes a member of the beta-1,3-N-acetylglucosaminyltransferase family. This enzyme is a type II transmembrane protein and contains a signal anchor that is not cleaved. It prefers the substrates of lacto-N-tetraose and lacto-N-neotetraose, and is involved in the biosynthesis of poly-N-acetyllactosamine chains and the biosynthesis of the backbone structure of dimeric sialyl Lewis a. It plays dominant roles in L-selectin ligand biosynthesis, lymphocyte homing and lymphocyte trafficking.
