= N-Acetyllactosamine =

Names
- IUPAC name N-[β-D-Galactopyranosyl-(1→4)-(2-deoxy-D-glucos-2-yl)]acetamide
- Systematic IUPAC name N-[(2R,3R,4S,5R)-3,5,6-Trihydroxy-1-oxo-4-{[(2S,3R,4S,5R,6R)-3,4,5-trihydroxy-6-(hydroxymethyl)oxan-2-yl]oxy}hexan-2-yl]acetamide
- Other names β-D-galactopyranosyl-(1→4)-2-acetamido-2-deoxy-β-D-glucopyranose; 2-(Acetylamino)-2-deoxy-4-O-hexopyranosylhexopyranose

Identifiers
CAS Number	32181-59-2
3D model (JSmol)	Interactive image
ChEBI	CHEBI:16153
ChEMBL	ChEMBL457432
ChemSpider	7975931
ECHA InfoCard	100.164.310
KEGG	C00611
PubChem CID	439271
UNII	3Y5B2K5OOK
CompTox Dashboard (EPA)	DTXSID10954045
- InChI: InChI=1S/C14H25NO11/c1-4(18)15-7-9(20)12(6(3-17)24-13(7)23)26-14-11(22)10(21)8(19)5(2-16)25-14/h5-14,16-17,19-23H,2-3H2,1H3,(H,15,18)/t5-,6-,7-,8+,9-,10+,11-,12-,13-,14+/m1/s1 Key: KFEUJDWYNGMDBV-LODBTCKLSA-N
- SMILES: CC(=O)N[C@@H]1[C@H]([C@@H]([C@H](O[C@H]1O)CO)O[C@H]2[C@@H]([C@H]([C@H]([C@H](O2)CO)O)O)O)O

Properties
Chemical formula	C_{14}H_{25}NO_{11}
Molar mass	383.350 g·mol^{−1}
- Except where otherwise noted, data are given for materials in their standard state (at 25 °C [77 °F], 100 kPa). Infobox references

N-Acetyllactosamine (LacNAc) (also known as CD75) is a nitrogen-containing disaccharide, a lactosamine derivative that is substituted with an acetyl group on its glucosamine component.

The N-acetyllactosamine is a component of many glycoproteins and functions as a carbohydrate antigen that is thought to play roles in normal cellular recognition as well as in malignant transformation and metastasis. It is also found in the structure of human milk oligosaccharides and has prebiotic effects.
