= Chemical specificity =

Ability of biomolecules to bind specific ligands

Chemical specificity is the ability of binding site of a macromolecule (such as a protein) to bind specific ligands. The fewer ligands a protein can bind, the greater its specificity.

Specificity describes the strength of binding between a given protein and ligand. This relationship can be described by a dissociation constant, which characterizes the balance between bound and unbound states for the protein-ligand system. In the context of a single enzyme and a pair of binding molecules, the two ligands can be compared as stronger or weaker ligands (for the enzyme) on the basis of their dissociation constants. (A lower value corresponds to a stronger binding.)

Specificity for a set of ligands is unrelated to the ability of an enzyme to catalyze a given reaction, with the ligand as a substrate.

If a given enzyme has a high chemical specificity, this means that the set of ligands to which it binds is limited, such that neither binding events nor catalysis can occur at an appreciable rate with additional molecules.

An example of a protein-ligand pair whose binding activity can be highly specific is the antibody-antigen system. Affinity maturation typically leads to highly specific interactions, whereas naive antibodies are promiscuous and bind a larger number of ligands. Conversely, an example of a protein-ligand system that can bind substrates and catalyze multiple reactions effectively is the Cytochrome P450 system, which can be considered a promiscuous enzyme due to its broad specificity for multiple ligands. Proteases are a group of enzymes that show a broad range of cleavage specificities. Promiscuous proteases as digestive enzymes unspecifically degrade peptides, whereas highly specific proteases are involved in signaling cascades.

== Basis ==
=== Binding ===
The interactions between the protein and ligand substantially affect the specificity between the two entities. Electrostatic interactions and Hydrophobic interactions are known to be the most influential in regards to where specificity between two molecules is derived from. The strength of these interactions between the protein and ligand often positively correlate with their specificity for one another.

The specificity of a binding process is strongly dependent of the flexibility of the binding partners. A rigid protein is very restricted in its binding possibilities. A flexible protein can adapt its conformation to a larger number of ligands and thus is more promiscuous. As the binding process usually leads to a rigidification of both binding partners in the complex, binding of a flexible protein usually comes with an entropic penalty. This is the main reason for the frequently found positive correlation of binding affinity and binding specificity. Antibodies show a strong correlation between rigidity and specificity. This correlation extends far beyond the paratope of the antibodies

=== Catalysis ===
Enzyme specificity refers to the interactions between any particular enzyme and its corresponding substrate. In addition to the specificity in binding its substrates, correct proximity and orientation as well as binding the transition state provide an additional layer of enzyme specificity.

== Types ==
Enzymes vary in the specificity of the substrates that they bind to, in order to carry out specific physiological functions. Some enzymes may need to be less specific and therefore may bind to numerous substrates to catalyze a reaction. On the other hand, certain physiological functions require extreme specificity of the enzyme for a single specific substrate in order for a proper reaction and physiological phenotype to occur. The different types of categorizations differ based on their specificity for substrates. Most generally, they are divided into four groups: absolute, group, linkage, and stereochemical specificity.

=== Absolute specificity ===
Absolute specificity can be thought of as being exclusive, in which an enzyme acts upon one specific substrate. Absolute specific enzymes will only catalyze one reaction with its specific substrate. For example, lactase is an enzyme specific for the degradation of lactose into two sugar monosaccharides, glucose and galactose. Another example is Glucokinase, which is an enzyme involved in the phosphorylation of glucose to glucose-6-phosphate. It is primarily active in the liver and is the main isozyme of Hexokinase. Its absolute specificity refers to glucose being the only hexose that is able to be its substrate, as opposed to hexokinase, which accommodates many hexoses as its substrate.

=== Group specificity ===
Group specificity occurs when an enzyme will only react with molecules that have specific functional groups, such as aromatic structures, phosphate groups, and methyls. One example is pepsin, an enzyme that is crucial in digestion of foods ingested in our diet, that hydrolyzes peptide bonds in between hydrophobic amino acids, with recognition for aromatic side chains such as phenylalanine, tryptophan, and tyrosine. Another example is hexokinase, an enzyme involved in glycolysis that phosphorylates glucose to produce glucose-6-phosphate. This enzyme exhibits group specificity by allowing multiple hexoses (6 carbon sugars) as its substrate. Glucose is one of the most important substrates in metabolic pathways involving hexokinase due to its role in glycolysis, but is not the only substrate that hexokinase can catalyze a reaction with.

=== Bond specificity ===
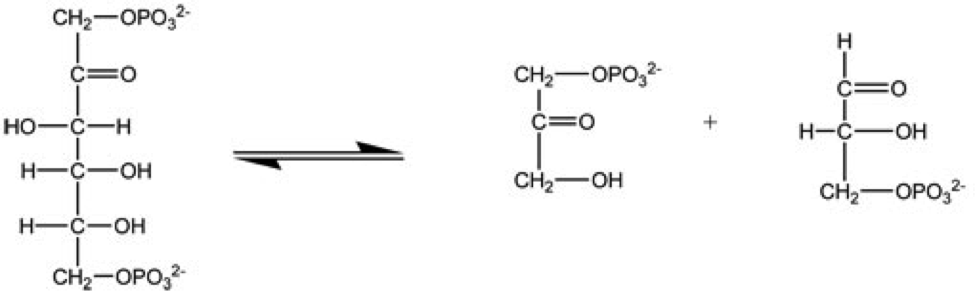
A reaction that illustrates an enzyme cleaving a specific bond of the reactant in order to create two products

Bond specificity, unlike group specificity, recognizes particular chemical bond types. This differs from group specificity, as it is not reliant on the presence of particular functional groups in order to catalyze a particular reaction, but rather a certain bond type (for example, a peptide bond).

=== Stereochemical specificity ===
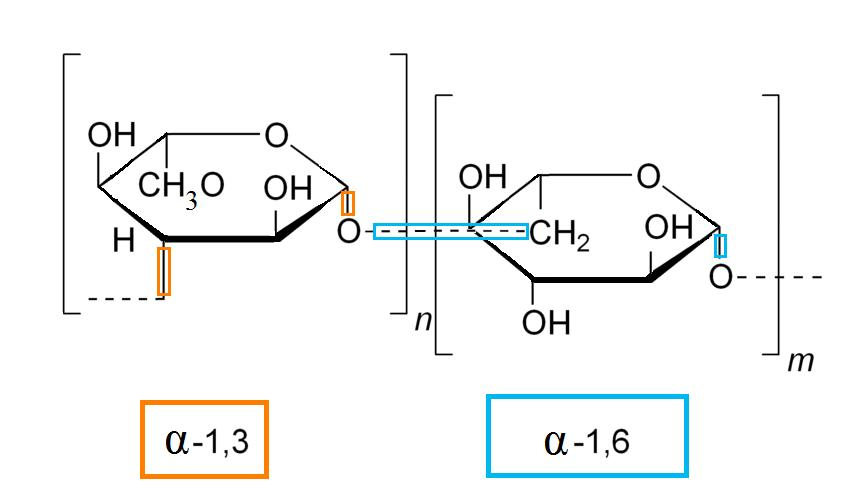
Sugars containing alpha-glycosidic linkages

This type of specificity is sensitive to the substrate's optical activity of orientation. Stereochemical molecules differ in the way in which they rotate plane polarized light, or orientations of linkages (see alpha, beta glycosidic linkages). Enzymes that are stereochemically specific will bind substrates with these particular properties. For example, beta-glycosidase will only react with beta-glycosidic bonds which are present in cellulose, but not present in starch and glycogen, which contain alpha-glycosidic linkages. This is relevant in how mammals are able to digest food. For instance, the enzyme Amylase is present in mammal saliva, that is stereo-specific for alpha-linkages, this is why mammals are able to efficiently use starch and glycogen as forms of energy, but not cellulose (because it is a beta-linkage).

== Determination ==
Specific equilibrium dissociation constant for formation of the enzyme-substrate complex is known as $k_d$. It is used as a measure of affinity, with higher values indicating a lower affinity.

For the given equation (E = enzyme, S = substrate, P = product),

$$E + S \overset{k_1}\underset{k_-{1}}\Longleftrightarrow ES \overset{k_2}\Longleftrightarrow E + P$$

$k_d$ would be equivalent to $k_{-1}/k_1$, where $k_1$ and $k_{-1}$ are the rates of the forward and backward reaction, respectively in the conversion of individual E and S to the enzyme substrate complex.

Information theory allows for a more quantitative definition of specificity by calculating the entropy in the binding spectrum.

=== Application to enzyme kinetics ===
The chemical specificity of an enzyme for a particular substrate can be found using two variables that are derived from the Michaelis-Menten equation. $k_m$ approximates the dissociation constant of enzyme-substrate complexes. $k_{cat}$ represents the turnover rate, or the number of reactions catalyzed by an enzyme over the enzyme amount. $k_{cat}$ over $k_m$ is known as the specificity constant, which gives a measure of the affinity of a substrate to some particular enzyme. Also known as the efficiency of an enzyme, this relationship reveals an enzyme's preference for a particular substrate. The higher the specificity constant of an enzyme corresponds to a high preference for that substrate.

== Significance ==
=== Medical research relevance ===
Enzymatic specificity provides useful insight into enzyme structure, which ultimately determines and plays a role in physiological functions. Specificity studies also may provide information of the catalytic mechanism.

Specificity is important for novel drug discovery and the field of clinical research, with new drugs being tested for its specificity to the target molecule in various rounds of clinical trials. Drugs must contain as specific as possible structures in order to minimize the possibility of off-target affects that would produce unfavorable symptoms in the patient. Drugs depend on the specificity of the designed molecules and formulations to inhibit particular molecular targets. Novel drug discovery progresses with experiments involving highly specific compounds. For example, the basis that drugs must successfully be proven to accomplish is both the ability to bind the target receptor in the physiological environment with high specificity and also its ability to transduce a signal to produce a favorable biological effect against the sickness or disease that the drug is intended to negate.

== Applications ==
Scientific techniques, such as immunostaining, depend on chemical specificity. Immunostaining utilizes the chemical specificity of antibodies in order to detect a protein of interest at the cellular level. Another technique that relies on chemical specificity is Western blotting, which is utilized to detect a certain protein of interest in a tissue. This technique involves gel electrophoresis followed by transferring of the sample onto a membrane which is stained by antibodies. Antibodies are specific to the target protein of interest, and will contain a fluorescent tag signaling the presence of the researcher's protein of interest.

== See also ==
- Enzyme promiscuity
- Substrate (chemistry)
