= N-Acetylglucosamine =

Biological molecule

- Haworth projection

Names
- IUPAC name β-D-(Acetylamino)-2-deoxy-glucopyranose
- Other names N-Acetyl-D-glucosamine; GlcNAc; NAG

Identifiers
CAS Number	7512-17-6
3D model (JSmol)	Interactive image
Beilstein Reference	1247660
ChEBI	CHEBI:28009
ChEMBL	ChEMBL447878
ChemSpider	22563
ECHA InfoCard	100.028.517
EC Number	231-368-2
Gmelin Reference	721281
KEGG	C03878
PubChem CID	24139
UNII	V956696549
CompTox Dashboard (EPA)	DTXSID301045979 DTXSID3045855, DTXSID301045979
- InChI: InChI=1S/C8H15NO6/c1-3(11)9-5-7(13)6(12)4(2-10)15-8(5)14/h4-8,10,12-14H,2H2,1H3,(H,9,11)/t4-,5-,6-,7-,8-/m1/s1 Key: OVRNDRQMDRJTHS-FMDGEEDCSA-N; InChI=1/C8H15NO6/c1-3(11)9-5-7(13)6(12)4(2-10)15-8(5)14/h4-8,10,12-14H,2H2,1H3,(H,9,11)/t4-,5-,6-,7-,8-/m1/s1 Key: OVRNDRQMDRJTHS-FMDGEEDCBL
- SMILES: O=C(N[C@@H]1[C@@H](O)[C@H](O)[C@H](O[C@H]1O)CO)C

Properties
Chemical formula	C_{8}H_{15}NO_{6}
Molar mass	221.21
Melting point	211

Related compounds
Related Monosaccharides	N-Acetylgalactosamine
Related compounds	Glucosamine; Glucose
- Except where otherwise noted, data are given for materials in their standard state (at 25 °C [77 °F], 100 kPa). verify (what is ?) Infobox references

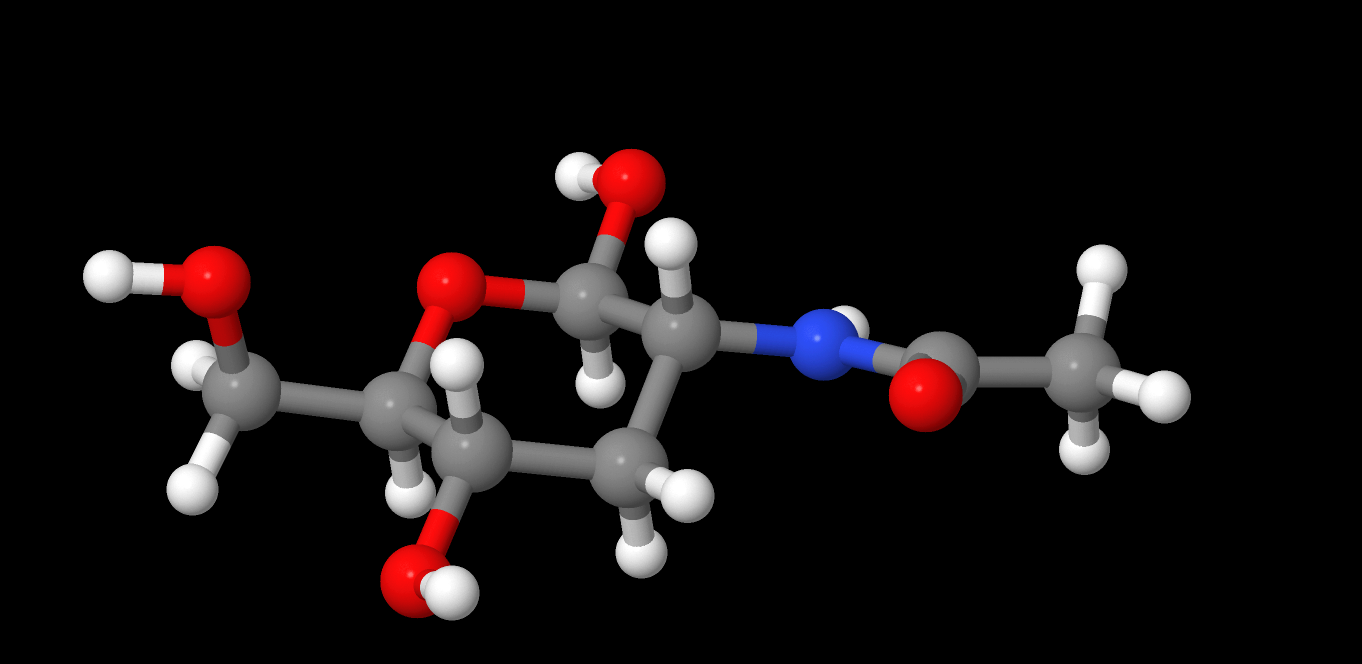
N-Acetylglucosamine molecule

N-Acetylglucosamine (GlcNAc) is an amide derivative of the monosaccharide glucose. It is a secondary amide between glucosamine and acetic acid. It is significant in several biological systems.

GlcNAc is important for the post-translational modification glycosylation, specifically N-linked and O-glycosylation. In N-linked glycosylation, it is the first sugar in the chain, attached to the nitrogen of an asparagine (N) in a protein. The rest of the sugar chain is attached to the GlcNAc.

It is part of a biopolymer in the bacterial cell wall, which is built from alternating units of GlcNAc and N-acetylmuramic acid (MurNAc), cross-linked with oligopeptides at the lactic acid residue of MurNAc. This layered structure is called peptidoglycan (formerly called murein).

GlcNAc is the monomeric unit of the polymer chitin, which forms the exoskeletons of arthropods like insects and crustaceans. It is the main component of the radulas of mollusks, the beaks of cephalopods, and a major component of the cell walls of most fungi.

Polymerized with glucuronic acid, it forms hyaluronan.

GlcNAc has been reported to be an inhibitor of elastase release from human polymorphonuclear leukocytes (range 8–17% inhibition), however this is much weaker than the inhibition seen with N-acetylgalactosamine (range 92–100%).

== Medical uses ==
It has been proposed as a treatment for autoimmune diseases and recent tests have claimed some success.

== O-GlcNAcylation ==
O-GlcNAcylation is the process of adding a single N-acetylglucosamine sugar to the serine or threonine of a protein, controlled by a pair of opposing enzymes: O-GlcNAc transferase (OGT) and O-GlcNAcase (OGA). Comparable to phosphorylation, addition or removal of N-acetylglucosamine is a means of activating or deactivating enzymes or transcription factors. In fact, O-GlcNAcylation and phosphorylation often compete for the same serine/threonine sites. O-GlcNAcylation most often occurs on chromatin proteins, and is often seen as a response to stress.

Dysregulated O-GlcNAcylation is increasingly recognized as a feature of multiple disease states, including diabetes, neurodegenerative and cognitive disorders, cancer, and inflammatory diseases such as arthritis. Hyperglycemia increases O-GlcNAcylation, leading to insulin resistance. Increased O-GlcNAcylation due to hyperglycemia is evidently a dysfunctional form of O-GlcNAcylation. O-GlcNAcylation decline in the brain with age is associated with cognitive decline. When O-GlcNAcylation was increased in the hippocampus of aged mice, spatial learning and memory improved. Furthermore, O-GlcNAcylation may also be involved in cancer pathogenesis, due to its close ties with various nutritional and growth signal transductions.

== See also ==
- Keratan sulfate
- N-Acetylgalactosamine (GalNAc)
- N-Acetyllactosamine synthase
- Wheat germ agglutinin, a plant lectin that binds to this substrate
