= Uridine diphosphate galactose =

Names
- IUPAC name Uridine 5′-(α-D-galactopyranosyl dihydrogen diphosphate)
- Systematic IUPAC name O^{1}-{{#parsoidfragment:0}}{[(2R,3S,4R,5R)-5-(2,4-Dioxo-3,4-dihydropyrimidin-1(2H)-yl)-3,4-dihydroxyoxolan-2-yl]methyl} O^{3}-[(2R,3R,4S,5R,6R)-3,4,5-trihydroxy-6-(hydroxymethyl)oxan-2-yl] dihydrogen diphosphate

Identifiers
CAS Number	2956-16-3
3D model (JSmol)	Interactive image
ChEMBL	ChEMBL1743884
ChemSpider	19951534
MeSH	Uridine+diphosphate+galactose
PubChem CID	1166
UNII	O2HY4WY2W1
CompTox Dashboard (EPA)	DTXSID60903962
- InChI: InChI=1S/C9H12N2O6.C6H14O12P2/c12-3-4-6(14)7(15)8(17-4)11-2-1-5(13)10-9(11)16;7-1-3(9)5(10)6(18-20(14,15)16)4(2-8)17-19(11,12)13/h1-2,4,6-8,12,14-15H,3H2,(H,10,13,16);2-7,9-10H,1H2,(H2,11,12,13)(H2,14,15,16)/p-4/t4-,6-,7-,8-;3-,4+,5+,6-/m11/s1 Key: UYLAOKYVSPTOGT-UESRDHDISA-J; InChI=1/C9H12N2O6.C6H14O12P2/c12-3-4-6(14)7(15)8(17-4)11-2-1-5(13)10-9(11)16;7-1-3(9)5(10)6(18-20(14,15)16)4(2-8)17-19(11,12)13/h1-2,4,6-8,12,14-15H,3H2,(H,10,13,16);2-7,9-10H,1H2,(H2,11,12,13)(H2,14,15,16)/p-4/t4-,6-,7-,8-;3-,4+,5+,6-/m11/s1 Key: UYLAOKYVSPTOGT-HUYLZDLQBS
- SMILES: [H]OC([H])([H])[C@]1([H])O[C@]([H])(O[P@@](=O)(O[H])O[P@](=O)(O[H])OC([H])([H])[C@]2([H])O[C@@]([H])(N3C([H])=C([H])C(=O)N([H])C3=O)[C@]([H])(O[H])[C@@]2([H])O[H])[C@]([H])(O[H])[C@]([H])(O[H])[C@@]1([H])O[H]

Properties
Chemical formula	C_{15}H_{24}N_{2}O_{17}P_{2}
Molar mass	566.302 g/mol
- Except where otherwise noted, data are given for materials in their standard state (at 25 °C [77 °F], 100 kPa). verify (what is ?) Infobox references

Uridine diphosphate galactose (UDP-galactose) is an intermediate in the production of polysaccharides. It is important in nucleotide sugars metabolism, and is the substrate for the transferase B4GALT5.

== Sugar metabolism ==
Uridine diphosphate (UDP)-galactose is relevant in glycolysis. UDP-galactose is the activated form of Gal, a crucial monosaccharide building block for human milk oligosaccharide (HMO). The activated form of galactose (Gal) serves as a donor molecule involved in catalyzing the conversion of UDP-galactose to UDP-glucose. The conversion is a rate-limiting step essential to the pace of UDP-glucose production that determines the completion of glycosylation reactions.

To further explain, UDP-galactose is derived from a galactose molecule which is an epimer of glucose, and via the Leloir pathway, it is used be used as a precursor for the metabolism of glucose into pyruvate. When lactose is hydrolyzed, D-Galactose enters the liver via the bloodstream. There, galactokinase phosphorylates it to galactose-1-phosphate using ATP. This compound then engages in a "ping-pong" reaction with UDP-glucose, catalyzed by uridylyltransferase, yielding glucose-1-phosphate and UDP-galactose. This glucose-1-phosphate feeds into glycolysis, while UDP-galactose undergoes epimerization to regenerate UDP-glucose.

transforming galactose (1) to glucose for the glycolysis. Galactose-1-phosphate (2), UDP-glucose (3), UDP-galactose (4); Glucose 1-phosphate (5); Glucose 6-phosphate (6). Galactokinase (GK), Galactose-1-phosphate uridylyltransferase (GALT), UDP-glucose 4-epimerase (UGE), phosphoglucomutase (PGM)

== See also ==
- Galactose
- UDP galactose epimerase
- Uridine diphosphate
