= Nonsense suppressor =

A nonsense suppressor is a factor which can inhibit the effect of the nonsense mutation. Nonsense suppressors can be generally divided into two classes: a) a mutated tRNA which can bind with a termination codon on mRNA; b) a mutation on ribosomes decreasing the effect of a termination codon. It is believed that nonsense suppressors keep a low concentration in the cell and do not disrupt normal translation most of the time. In addition, many genes do not have only one termination codon, and cells commonly use ochre codons as the termination signal, whose nonsense suppressors are usually inefficient.

Nonsense suppressors are a useful genetic tool, but can also result in problematic side effects, since all identical stop codons in the genome will also be suppressed to the same degree. Genes with different or multiple stop codons will be unaffected.

SUP35, a nonsense suppressor identified by Wickner in 1994, is a prion protein.

In synthetic biology, artificial suppressor elongator tRNAs are used to incorporate unnatural amino acids at nonsense codons placed in the coding sequence of a gene. Start codons can also be suppressed with suppressor initiator tRNAs, such as the amber stop codon suppressor tRNA^{fMet2}(CUA). The amber initiator tRNA is charged with methionine and glutamine.

In recent research, a novel gene therapy approach is provided by Jiaming Wang and Yue Zhang. They use an adeno-associated virus (AAV) vector to deliver a new suppressor tRNA (sup-tRNA^{tyr}) into a mouse model carrying a nonsense mutation(Idua-W401X,TCG→TAG). This model recapitulates a human LSD, mucopolysaccharidosis disease type I (or Hurler Syndrome), caused by absence of the enzyme α-l-iduronidase (IDUA) leading to accumulation of glycosaminoglycans (GAG) and resulting pathogenesis. This method rescues the pathogenic defects and is essentially stable for 6 months.

== Bacteriophage T4 ==
Escherichia coli strains carrying nonsense suppressor genes had a central role in the early work on bacteriophage genetics. In particular, E. coli strains carrying amber suppressors (suppressors of the UAG nonsense codon) enabled the isolation and propagation of bacteriophage T4 mutants defective in phage assembly, morphogenesis, DNA replication, DNA repair and genetic recombination and thus facilitated the early study of these processes at a fundamental level.

== Archaea ==
Nonsense suppression by altered tRNA was demonstrated in the archaeon Haloferax volcana for the chain terminating stop codons UAG (amber), UAA (ochre) and UGA (opal).
