= Fungal prion =

Prion that infects fungal hosts

Formation of PSI+ prion causes S. cerevisiae cells with nonsense-mutation in ade1 gene to convert red pigment (colony below) into a colourless compound, causing colonies to become white (above)

A fungal prion is a prion that infects hosts which are fungi. Fungal prions are naturally occurring proteins that can switch between multiple, structurally distinct conformations, at least one of which is self-propagating and transmissible to other prions. This transmission of protein state represents an epigenetic phenomenon where information is encoded in the protein structure itself, instead of in nucleic acids. Several prion-forming proteins have been identified in fungi, primarily in the yeast Saccharomyces cerevisiae. These fungal prions are generally considered benign, and in some cases even confer a selectable advantage to the organism.

Fungal prions have provided a model for the understanding of disease-forming mammalian prions. Study of fungal prions has led to a characterisation of the sequence features and mechanisms that enable prion domains to switch between functional and amyloid-forming states.

== Sequence features ==
Prions are formed by portable, transmissible prion domains that are often enriched in asparagine, glutamine, tyrosine and glycine residues. When a reporter protein is fused with a prion domain, it forms a chimeric protein that demonstrates the conformational switching that is characteristic of prions. Meanwhile, removing this prion domain prevents prionogenesis. This suggests that these prion domains are, in fact, portable and are the sole initiator of prionogenesis. This supports the protein-only hypothesis.

A recent study of candidate prion domains in S. cerevisiae found several specific sequence features that were common to proteins showing aggregation and self-templating properties. For example, proteins that aggregated had candidate prion domains that were more highly enriched in asparagine, while non-aggregating domains were more highly enriched in glutamine and charged peptides. There was also evidence that the spacing of charged peptides that prevent amyloid formation, such as proline, is important in prionogenesis. This discovery of sequence specificity was a departure from previous work that had suggested that the only determining factor in prionogenesis was the overall distribution of peptides.

== HET-s prion of Podospora anserina ==
Podospora anserina is a filamentous fungus. Genetically compatible colonies of this fungus can merge and share cellular contents such as nutrients and cytoplasm. A natural system of protective "incompatibility" proteins exists to prevent promiscuous sharing between unrelated colonies. One such protein, called HET-s, adopts a prion-like form in order to function properly. The prion form of HET-s spreads rapidly throughout the cellular network of a colony and can convert the non-prion form of the protein to a prion state after compatible colonies have merged. However, when an incompatible colony tries to merge with a prion-containing colony, the prion causes the "invader" cells to die, ensuring that only related colonies obtain the benefit of sharing resources.

== Prions of yeast ==
=== [PSI+] and [URE3] ===
In 1965, Brian Cox, a geneticist working with the yeast Saccharomyces cerevisiae, described a genetic trait (termed [PSI+]) with an unusual pattern of inheritance. The initial discovery of [PSI+] was made in a strain auxotrophic for adenine due to a nonsense mutation. Despite many years of effort, Cox could not identify a conventional mutation that was responsible for the [PSI+] trait. In 1994, yeast geneticist Reed Wickner correctly hypothesized that [PSI+] as well as another mysterious heritable trait, [URE3], resulted from prion forms of the normal cellular proteins, Sup35p and Ure2p, respectively. The names of yeast prions are frequently placed within brackets to indicate that they are non-mendelian in their passage to progeny cells, much like plasmid and mitochondrial DNA.

Further investigation found that [PSI+] is the result of a self-propagating misfolded form of Sup35p (a 201 amino acid long protein), which is an important factor for translation termination during protein synthesis. In [PSI+] yeast cells the Sup35 protein forms filamentous aggregates known as amyloid. The amyloid conformation is self-propagating and represents the prion state. Amazingly distinct prion states exist for the Sup35 protein with distinct properties and these distinctions are self-propagating. Other prions also can form distinct different variants (or strains). It is believed that suppression of nonsense mutations in [PSI+] cells is due to a reduced amount of functional Sup35 because much of the protein is in the amyloid state. The Sup35 protein assembles into amyloid via an amino-terminal prion domain. The structure is based on the stacking of the prion domains in an in-register and parallel beta sheet conformation.

An important finding by Chernoff, in a collaboration between the Liebman and Lindquist laboratories, was that a protein chaperone was required for [PSI+] to be maintained. Because the only function of chaperones is to help proteins fold properly, this finding strongly supported Wickner's hypothesis that [PSI+] was a heritable protein state (i.e. a prion). Likewise, this finding also provided evidence for the general hypothesis that prions, including the originally proposed mammalian PrP prion, are heritable forms of protein. Because of the action of chaperones, especially Hsp104, proteins that code for [PSI+] and [URE3] can convert from non-prion to prion forms. For this reason, yeast prions are good models for studying factors like chaperones that affect protein aggregation. Also, the IPOD is the sub-cellular site to which amyloidogenic proteins are sequestered in yeast, and where prions like [PSI+] may undergo maturation. Thus, prions also serve as substrates to understand the intracellular processing of protein aggregates such as amyloid.

Laboratories commonly identify [PSI+] by growth of a strain auxotrophic for adenine on media lacking adenine, similar to that used by Cox et al. These strains cannot synthesize adenine due to a nonsense mutation in one of the enzymes involved in the biosynthetic pathway. When the strain is grown on yeast-extract/dextrose/peptone media (YPD), the blocked pathway results in buildup of a red-colored intermediate compound, which is exported from the cell due to its toxicity. Hence, color is an alternative method of identifying [PSI+] -- [PSI+] strains are white or pinkish in color, and [psi-] strains are red. A third method of identifying [PSI+] is by the presence of Sup35 in the pelleted fraction of cellular lysate.

When exposed to certain adverse conditions, in some genetic backgrounds [PSI+] cells actually fare better than their prion-free siblings; this finding suggests that the ability to adopt a [PSI+] prion form may result from positive evolutionary selection. It has been speculated that the ability to convert between prion-infected and prion-free forms acts as an evolutionary capacitor to enable yeast to quickly and reversibly adapt in variable environments. Nevertheless, Reed Wickner maintains that [URE3] and [PSI+] are diseases, although this claim has been challenged using theoretical population genetic models.

=== [PIN+] / [RNQ+] ===
The term [PIN+] was coined by Liebman and colleagues from Psi-INducibility, to describe a genetic requirement for the formation of the [PSI+] prion. They showed that [PIN+] was required for the induction of most variants of the [PSI+] prion. Later they identified [PIN+] as the prion form of the RNQ1 protein The more precise name [RNQ+] is now sometimes used because other factors or prions can also have a Psi-inducing phenotype.

A non-prion function of Rnq1 has not been definitively characterized. Though reasons for this are poorly understood, it is suggested that [PIN+] aggregates may act as "seeds" for the polymerization of [PSI+] and other prions. The basis of the [PIN+] prion is an amyloid form of Rnq1 arranged in in-register parallel beta sheets, like the amyloid form of Sup35. Due to similar amyloid structures, the [PIN+] prion may facilitate the formation of [PSI+] through a templating mechanism.

Two modified versions of Sup35 have been created that can induce PSI+ in the absence of [PIN+] when overexpressed. One version was created by digestion of the gene with the restriction enzyme Bal2, which results in a protein consisting of only the M and N portions of Sup35. The other is a fusion of Sup35NM with HPR, a human membrane receptor protein.

== Epigenetics ==
Prions act as an alternative form of non-Mendelian, phenotypic inheritance due to their self-templating ability. This makes prions a metastable, dominant mechanism for inheritance that relies solely on the conformation of the protein. Many proteins containing prion domains play a role in gene expression or RNA binding, which is how an alternative conformation can give rise to phenotypic variation. For example, the [psi-] state of Sup35 in yeast is a translation termination factor. When Sup35 undergoes a conformational change to the [PSI+] prion state, it forms amyloid fibrils and is sequestered, leading to more frequent stop codon read-through and the development of novel phenotypes. With over 20 prion-like domains identified in yeast, this gives rise to the opportunity for a significant amount of variation from a single proteome. It has been posited that this increased variation gives a selectable advantage to a population of genetically homogeneous yeast.

== List of characterized prions ==
Protein	Natural Host	Normal Function	Prion State	Prion Phenotype	Year Identified
Ure2	Saccharomyces cerevisiae	Nitrogen catabolite repressor	[URE3]	Growth on poor nitrogen sources	1994
Sup35	Saccharomyces cerevisiae	Translation termination factor	[PSI+]	Increased levels of nonsense suppression	1994
HET-S	Podospora anserina	Regulates heterokaryon incompatibility	[Het-s]	Heterokaryon formation between incompatible strains	1997
vacuolar protease B	Saccharomyces cerevisiae	death in stationary phase, failure in meiosis	[β]	failure to degrade cellular proteins under N starvation	2003
MAP kinases	Podospora anserina	increased pigment, slow growth	[C]		2006
Rnq1p	Saccharomyces cerevisiae	Protein template factor	[RNQ+], [PIN+]	Promotes aggregation of other prions	2000
Mca1*	Saccharomyces cerevisiae	Putative Yeast Caspase	[MCA+]	Unknown	2008
Swi1	Saccharomyces cerevisiae	Chromatin remodeling	[SWI+]	Poor growth on some carbon sources	2008
Cyc8	Saccharomyces cerevisiae	Transcriptional repressor	[OCT+]	Transcriptional derepression of multiple genes	2009
Mot3	Saccharomyces cerevisiae	Nuclear transcription factor	[MOT3+]	Transcriptional derepression of anaerobic genes	2009
Pma1+Std1	Saccharomyces cerevisiae	Pma1 = major plasma membrane proton pump, Std1=minor pump	[GAR+]	Resistant to glucose-associated repression	2009
Sfp1	Saccharomyces cerevisiae	Global transcriptional regulator	[ISP+]	Antisuppressor of certain sup35 mutations	2010
Mod5	Saccharomyces cerevisiae		[MOD+]		2012

[*The original paper that proposed Mca1 is a prion was retracted ]

== See also ==
- Prion
- Sup35p
- Epigenetics
- Amyloid
- Proteopathy
- JUNQ and IPOD
