= Ure2 internal ribosome entry site (IRES) =

In molecular biology, the Ure2 internal ribosome entry site (IRES) is an RNA element present in the 5' UTR of the mRNA of Ure2. It allows 5' cap- and eIF4E-independent translation of an N-terminally truncated form of Ure2. This truncated form lacks the prion-forming domain. It is a 104 nucleotide region, smaller than most viral IRES elements, which forms a stem-loop structure. EIF2A represses this IRES resulting in an inhibition of translation of the N-terminally truncated Ure2.

== See also ==
- Ure2
- Internal ribosome entry site
- Nrf2 internal ribosome entry site (IRES)
