= CMP-acetylneuraminate-lactosylceramide-sialyltransferase =

CMP-acetylneuraminate-lactosylceramide-sialyltransferase may refer to:

- Lactosylceramide alpha-2,6-N-sialyltransferase, an enzyme
- Lactosylceramide alpha-2,3-sialyltransferase, an enzyme
