= HET-S =

Fungal Prion in Podospora anserina

HET-S is a prion protein of the filamentous fungi Podospora anserina that regulates genetically controlled cell death called heterokaryon incompatibility. This protein is one of the nine het loci of P. anserina as genetic element that display non-Mendelian traits.

The HET-S expressing strains have two antagonistic alelles: the HET-s protein which can transition from a normal to an infectious state, and the HET-S protein that does not. The HET-s protein experiences two alternative states which are the active prion-infected HET-s, and the neutral HET-s*. When a HET-s strain fuses with a HET-S strain, only the fusion cell dies, but if a prion-free HET-s* strain fuses with the HET-S strain, it becomes a viable mixed cell called a heterokaryon.

HET-S differs from the HET-s protein by 13 amino acids, and the co-expression of the two in the same cytoplasm can lead to growth inhibition as well as cell death. The reaction only occurs if the active prion-infected HET-s and the HET-S strain fuse, or the HET-s infects the neutral HET-s* and then the HET-S fuses with it.
