= Α-N-Acetylneuraminyl-2,3-b-galactosyl-1,3-N-acetyl-galactosaminide 6-α-sialyltransferase =

Class of enzymes

α-N-Acetylneuraminyl-2,3-b-galactosyl-1,3-N-acetyl-galactosaminide 6-α-sialyltransferase

Identifiers
- EC no.: 2.4.99.7
- CAS no.: 129924-24-9

Databases
- IntEnz: IntEnz view
- BRENDA: BRENDA entry
- ExPASy: NiceZyme view
- KEGG: KEGG entry
- MetaCyc: metabolic pathway
- PRIAM: profile
- PDB structures: RCSB PDB PDBe PDBsum
Search
- PMC: articles
- PubMed: articles
- NCBI: proteins

α-N-Acetylneuraminyl-2,3-beta-galactosyl-1,3-N-acetylgalactosaminide 6-α-sialyltransferase (EC 2.4.99.7, sialyltransferase, cytidine monophosphoacetylneuraminate-(alpha-N-acetylneuraminyl-2,3-beta-galactosyl-1,3)-N-acetylgalactosaminide-alpha-2,6-sialyltransferase, alpha-N-acetylneuraminyl-2,3-beta-galactosyl-1,3-N-acetyl-galactosaminide alpha-2,6-sialyltransferase, SIAT7, ST6GALNAC, (alpha-N-acetylneuraminyl-2,3-beta-galactosyl-1,3)-N-acetyl-galactosaminide 6-alpha-sialyltransferase, CMP-N-acetylneuraminate:(alpha-N-acetylneuraminyl-2,3-beta-D-galactosyl-1,3)-N-acetyl-D-galactosaminide alpha-2,6-N-acetylneuraminyl-transferase) is an enzyme with systematic name CMP-N-acetylneuraminate:N-acetyl-alpha-neuraminyl-(2->3)-beta-D-galactosyl-(1->3)- N-acetyl-D-galactosaminide galactosamine-6-alpha-N-acetylneuraminyltransferase. This enzyme catalyses the following chemical reaction

CMP-N-acetylneuraminate + N-acetyl-alpha-neuraminyl-(2->3)-beta-D-galactosyl-(1->3)-N-acetyl-D-galactosaminyl-R $\rightleftharpoons$ CMP + N-acetyl-alpha-neuraminyl-(2->3)-beta-D-galactosyl-(1->3)-[N-acetyl-alpha-neuraminyl-(2->6)]-N-acetyl-D-galactosaminyl-R

This enzyme attaches N-acetylneuraminic acid in alpha-2,6-linkage to N-acetyl-galactosamine only when present in the structure, where R may be protein or p-nitrophenol.
