= Metabolic glycoengineering =

Chemical-biological technique

Metabolic glycoengineering (MGE) is a chemical-biological technique for modifying the glycocalyx of a cell by introducing new chemical functional groups onto cell-surface sugars, called glycans. These new chemical groups can alter the native function of glycans without altering the cellular genome.

== Principle and Mechanism ==
Glycans are chains of monosaccharides covalengtly linked to cell membrane proteins and lipids, forming glycoproteins and glycolipids respectively. They participate in cellular structure, cell signalling, and cell-cell recognition.

In MGE, cells are modified with artificial monosaccharides which carry different functional groups such as thiols, ketones, alkynes, and azides. These monosaccharides are taken up by cells and incorporated into cell-surface proteins and lipids via glycosylation, forming artificial glycans with unnatural chemical functional groups. The sialic acid pathway is the first and most widely utilised glycosylation pathway in MGE, due to the substrate versatility of sialyltransferases, which facilitate the easy absorption and incorporation of artificial analogues into biomolecules. In addition, the L-Fructose, N-acetylglucosamine (Glc-NAc), and N-acetylgalactosamine (Gal-NAc) pathways have been studied for a variety of applications in MGE.

Since cell-surface glycans are not genetically encoded, MGE is a non-genetic strategy to modify the cellular membrane. Therefore, it causes little interference with other cellular activities, an advantage over conventional genetic engineering techniques. This method is relatively non-toxic even under higher treatment conditions and can be applied to almost all cell types. Further, certain applications of MGE are reversible, allowing controlled and removable modifications to the cell surface.

== Applications ==
Glycans can be labeled with fluorescent dyes or nanoparticles via engineered monosaccharides containing azide groups, using click reactions. These markers allow for tracking of individual cells in living systems or in vitro, using fluorescent microscopy. Labeling of glycans only present in a certain bacterial species can also be used as a convenient means of identifying bacteria in a complex culture or mixture, using fluorescence. This application suffers the limitation that cells must absorb and metabolize the modified saccharide, resulting in a lack of control over where it ends up in the cellular proteome, possibly leading to a lack of specificity in the desired assay.

MGE can also be used to modulate cell adhesion, differentiation, and signalling, facilitating tissue engineering by combining cells and biomaterials to form tissues with improved function.

MGE approaches have also been used experimentally to improve the pharmacodynamic properties of biopharmaceuticals, specifically glycoproteins, by improving solubility or adding sites for attachment of therapeutic antibodies targeting particular cells. However, the rapid clearance of carbohydrates from the circulation, and the poor oral bioavailability of glycans, limits broader use of glycoengineering for this purpose.
