= ST6GALNAC4 =

Protein-coding gene in the species Homo sapiens

Identifiers
- Aliases: ST6GALNAC4, IV, SIAT3-C, SIAT3C, SIAT7-D, SIAT7D, ST6GALNACIV, ST6GalNAc, ST6 N-acetylgalactosaminide alpha-2,6-sialyltransferase 4
- External IDs: OMIM: 606378; MGI: 1341894; GeneCards: ST6GALNAC4
Enzyme activity
EC #	BRENDA	ExPASy	KEGG	MetaCyc
2.4.3.7	↗	↗	↗	↗

Gene location (Human)
Chr.	Chromosome 9 (human)
Band	9q34.11	Start	127,907,886 bp
Band	9q34.11	End	127,917,041 bp

Gene location (Mouse)
Chr.	Chromosome 2 (mouse)
Band	2|2 B	Start	32,477,107 bp
Band	2|2 B	End	32,489,710 bp
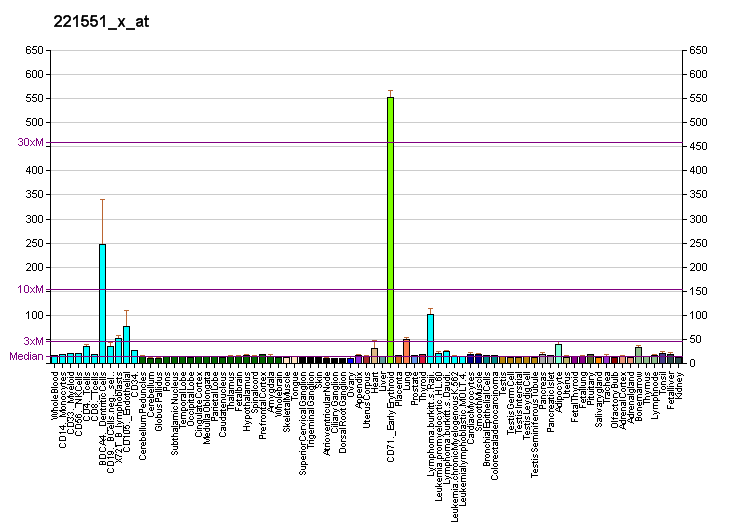

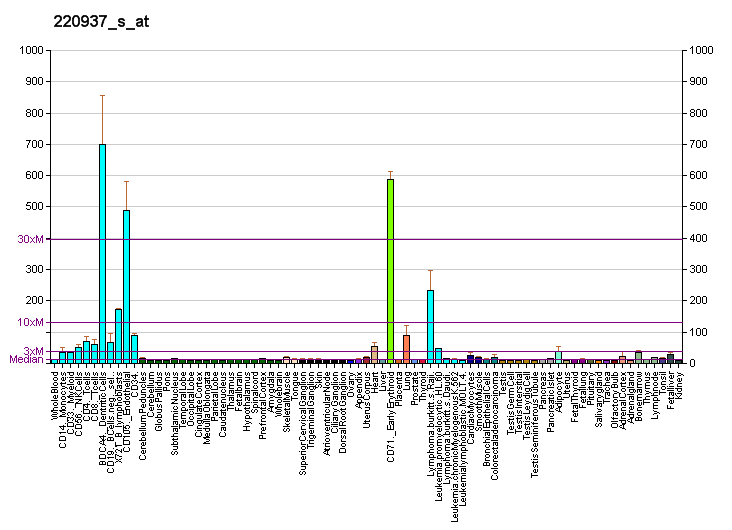
RNA expression pattern
Bgee	Human / Mouse (ortholog); Top expressed in: body of pancreas; apex of heart; upper lobe of left lung; spleen; right auricle of heart; right ovary; right coronary artery; mucosa of transverse colon; left ventricle; left coronary artery / Top expressed in: cerebellar cortex; dentate gyrus of hippocampal formation granule cell; granulocyte; muscle of thigh; superior frontal gyrus; primary visual cortex; stroma of bone marrow; embryo; left colon; lumbar subsegment of spinal cord; More reference expression data
BioGPS	More reference expression data
Gene ontology
Molecular function	transferase activity; glycosyltransferase activity; sialyltransferase activity; (alpha-N-acetylneuraminyl-2,3-beta-galactosyl-1,3)-N-acetyl-galactosaminide 6-alpha-sialyltransferase activity; alpha-N-acetylgalactosaminide alpha-2,6-sialyltransferase activity
Cellular component	integral component of membrane; Golgi apparatus; membrane; Golgi membrane
Biological process	O-glycan processing; protein glycosylation; oligosaccharide metabolic process; glycolipid metabolic process; sialylation; protein N-linked glycosylation via asparagine
Sources:Amigo / QuickGO
Orthologs
Databases	NCBI: entry; OMA: entry
Species	Human	Mouse
Entrez	27090	20448
Ensembl	ENSG00000136840	ENSMUSG00000079442
UniProt	Q9H4F1	Q9R2B6
RefSeq (mRNA)	NM_014403; NM_175039; NM_175040	NM_001276425; NM_011373
RefSeq (protein)	NP_778204; NP_778205	NP_001263354; NP_035503
Location (UCSC)	Chr 9: 127.91 – 127.92 Mb	Chr 2: 32.48 – 32.49 Mb
PubMed search
- Wikidata
View/Edit Human	View/Edit Mouse

ST6 (alpha-N-acetyl-neuraminyl-2,3-beta-galactosyl-1,3)-N-acetylgalactosaminide alpha-2,6-sialyltransferase 4, also known as sialyltransferase 3C (SIAT3-C) or sialyltransferase 7D (SIAT7-D) is a sialyltransferase enzyme that in humans is encoded by the ST6GALNAC4 gene.

== Function ==
ST6GALNAC4 is a type II membrane protein that catalyzes the transfer of sialic acid from CMP-sialic acid to galactose-containing substrates. The encoded protein prefers glycoproteins rather than glycolipids as substrates and shows restricted substrate specificity, utilizing only the trisaccharide sequence Neu5Ac-alpha-2,3-Gal-beta-1,3-GalNAc. In addition, it is involved in the synthesis of ganglioside GD1A from GM1B. The enzyme is normally found in the Golgi apparatus but can be proteolytically processed to a soluble form. This protein is a member of glycosyltransferase family 29. Transcript variants encoding different isoforms have been found for this gene.
