= ST8SIA6 =

Protein-coding gene in the species Homo sapiens

Identifiers
- Aliases: ST8SIA6, SIA8F, SIAT8F, ST8SIA-VI, ST8 alpha-N-acetyl-neuraminide alpha-2,8-sialyltransferase 6, ST8SiaVI, SIAT8-F
- External IDs: OMIM: 610139; MGI: 2386797; GeneCards: ST8SIA6

Gene location (Human)
| Chr. | Chromosome 10 (human) |
| Band | 10p12.33 | Start | 17,315,421 bp |
| Band | 10p12.33 | End | 17,454,595 bp |

Gene location (Mouse)
| Chr. | Chromosome 2 (mouse) |
| Band | 2|2 A1 | Start | 13,655,832 bp |
| Band | 2|2 A1 | End | 13,798,875 bp |
RNA expression pattern
| Bgee | Human / Mouse (ortholog); Top expressed in: testicle; gonad; substantia nigra; apex of heart; left ventricle; right auricle of heart; epithelium of colon; lung; thymus; white blood cell / Top expressed in: conjunctival fornix; transitional epithelium of urinary bladder; substantia nigra; epithelium of stomach; hair follicle; cornea; lateral septal nucleus; lacrimal gland; ciliary body; lumbar subsegment of spinal cord; More reference expression data |
| BioGPS | n/a |
Gene ontology
| Molecular function | transferase activity; sialyltransferase activity; glycosyltransferase activity; alpha-N-acetylneuraminate alpha-2,8-sialyltransferase activity |
| Cellular component | integral component of membrane; Golgi membrane; Golgi apparatus; membrane |
| Biological process | glycolipid biosynthetic process; sialylation; protein glycosylation; protein O-linked glycosylation; glycoprotein metabolic process; oligosaccharide metabolic process; ganglioside biosynthetic process; carbohydrate biosynthetic process; blastocyst hatching |
Sources:Amigo / QuickGO
Orthologs
| Databases | NCBI: entry; OMA: entry |
| Species | Human | Mouse |
| Entrez | 338596 | 241230 |
| Ensembl | ENSG00000148488 | ENSMUSG00000003418 |
| UniProt | P61647 | Q8K4T1 |
| RefSeq (mRNA) | NM_001004470; NM_001345961 | NM_145838 |
| RefSeq (protein) | NP_001004470; NP_001332890 | NP_665837 |
| Location (UCSC) | Chr 10: 17.32 – 17.45 Mb | Chr 2: 13.66 – 13.8 Mb |
| PubMed search |
- Wikidata
| View/Edit Human | View/Edit Mouse |

ST8 alpha-N-acetyl-neuraminide alpha-2,8-sialyltransferase 6 is a protein that in humans is encoded by the ST8SIA6 gene.

== Function ==
Sialic acid is a key determinate of oligosaccharide structures involved in cell-cell communication, cell-substrate interaction, adhesion, and protein targeting. ST8SIA6 belongs to a family of sialyltransferases (EC 2.4.99.8) that synthesize sialylglycoconjugates (Takashima et al., 2002 [PubMed 11980897]).
