= Ure2 =

Ure2, or Ure2p, is a yeast protein encoded by a gene known as URE2 (systematic designation YNL229C). The Ure2 protein can also form a yeast prion known as [URE3]. When Ura2p is expressed at high levels in yeast, it will readily convert from its native protein conformation into an aggregate known as an amyloid. [URE3], along with [PSI+], were both determined by Wickner (1994) to meet the genetic definition of a yeast prion.

The gene prefix "URE" stands for ureidosuccinate transport, as the Ure2 protein in its native state is responsible for repressing nitrogen catabolism of glutamine by controlling the GLN3 transcription factor. Gln3p is retained in the cytoplasm by Ure2p when a preferred nitrogen source like ammonium sulfate is present in the growth media, but enters the nucleus when the cells are shifted to a nonpreferred source of nitrogen such as proline. Ure2 protein also plays a role in responding to oxidative stress.

Ure2p is a protein composed of 354 amino acids and has a molecular weight of 40,226. Its gene, URE2, been mapped to chromosome XIV, 5 map units from KEX2.
