= Sup45p =

Sup45p is the Saccharomyces cerevisiae (a yeast) eukaryotic translation termination factor. More specifically, it is the yeast eukaryotic release factor 1 (eRF1). Its job is to recognize stop codons in RNA and bind to them. It binds to the Sup35p protein and then takes on the shape of a tRNA molecule so that it can safely incorporate itself into the A site of the Ribosome to disruptits flow and "release" the protein and end translation.
