= ST3GAL3 =

Protein found in humans

Identifiers
- Aliases: ST3GAL3, EIEE15, MRT12, SIAT6, ST3GALII, ST3GalIII, ST3N, ST3 beta-galactoside alpha-2,3-sialyltransferase 3, ST3Gal III, DEE15
- External IDs: OMIM: 606494; MGI: 1316659; GeneCards: ST3GAL3
Enzyme activity
EC #	BRENDA	ExPASy	KEGG	MetaCyc
2.4.3.6	↗	↗	↗	↗

Gene location (Human)
Chr.	Chromosome 1 (human)
Band	1p34.1	Start	43,705,824 bp
Band	1p34.1	End	43,931,165 bp

Gene location (Mouse)
Chr.	Chromosome 4 (mouse)
Band	4|4 D1- D2.1	Start	117,789,351 bp
Band	4|4 D1- D2.1	End	117,992,111 bp
RNA expression pattern
Bgee	Human / Mouse (ortholog); Top expressed in: muscle of thigh; gastrocnemius muscle; left testis; right testis; right frontal lobe; ganglionic eminence; apex of heart; epithelium of nasopharynx; ventricular zone; anterior cingulate cortex / Top expressed in: muscle of thigh; motor neuron; right ventricle; masseter muscle; ankle; medial head of gastrocnemius muscle; lumbar subsegment of spinal cord; internal carotid artery; intercostal muscle; left lobe of liver; More reference expression data
BioGPS	n/a
Gene ontology
Molecular function	transferase activity; glycosyltransferase activity; sialyltransferase activity; beta-galactoside (CMP) alpha-2,3-sialyltransferase activity; N-acetyllactosaminide alpha-2,3-sialyltransferase activity
Cellular component	integral component of membrane; Golgi apparatus; membrane; extracellular region; Golgi cisterna membrane; Golgi membrane
Biological process	sialylation; protein glycosylation; O-glycan processing; keratan sulfate biosynthetic process; oligosaccharide metabolic process; protein N-linked glycosylation via asparagine
Sources:Amigo / QuickGO
Orthologs
Databases	NCBI: entry; OMA: entry
Species	Human	Mouse
Entrez	6487	20441
Ensembl	ENSG00000126091	ENSMUSG00000028538
UniProt	Q11203	P97325
RefSeq (mRNA)	NM_001270459; NM_001270460; NM_001270461; NM_001270462; NM_001270463 NM_001270464; NM_001270465; NM_001270466; NM_006279; NM_174963; NM_174964; NM_174965; NM_174966; NM_174967; NM_174968; NM_174969; NM_174970; NM_174971; NM_174972; NM_001350619; NM_001350620; NM_001350621; NM_001363573	NM_001161774; NM_001285520; NM_001285521; NM_009176
RefSeq (protein)	NP_001257388; NP_001257389; NP_001257390; NP_001257391; NP_001257392 NP_001257393; NP_001257394; NP_001257395; NP_006270; NP_777623; NP_777624; NP_777625; NP_777626; NP_777627; NP_777628; NP_777629; NP_777630; NP_777631; NP_001337548; NP_001337549; NP_001337550; NP_001350502	NP_001155246; NP_001272449; NP_001272450; NP_033202
Location (UCSC)	Chr 1: 43.71 – 43.93 Mb	Chr 4: 117.79 – 117.99 Mb
PubMed search
- Wikidata
View/Edit Human	View/Edit Mouse

ST3 beta-galactoside alpha-2,3-sialyltransferase 3, also known as ST3GAL3, is a protein which in humans is encoded by the ST3GAL3 gene.

== Function ==
The protein encoded by this gene is a type II membrane protein that catalyzes the transfer of sialic acid from CMP-sialic acid to galactose-containing substrates. The encoded protein is normally found in the Golgi apparatus but can be proteolytically processed to a soluble form. This protein is a member of glycosyltransferase family 29. Multiple transcript variants encoding several different isoforms have been found for this gene.

Mutations in the ST3GAL3 gene was recently shown to be the cause of autosomal recessive mental retardation 12. Since the mutations disrupt a glycosylation pathway, this disorder may be considered a congenital disorder of glycosylation.

== See also ==
- Sialyltransferase
