= Nrf2 internal ribosome entry site (IRES) =

In molecular biology, the Nrf2 internal ribosome entry site (IRES) is an RNA element present in the 5′ UTR of the mRNA encoding the transcription factor Nrf2. It contains a stem-loop structure upstream of a ribosome binding site. This stem loop inhibits ribosome binding and translation of Nrf2 under normal conditions, but allows translation under oxidative stress conditions.

== See also ==
- Nrf2
- Internal ribosome entry site
- Ure2 internal ribosome entry site (IRES)
