= Sialyltransferase =

Class of enzymes

Glycosyltransferase family 29 (sialyltransferase)
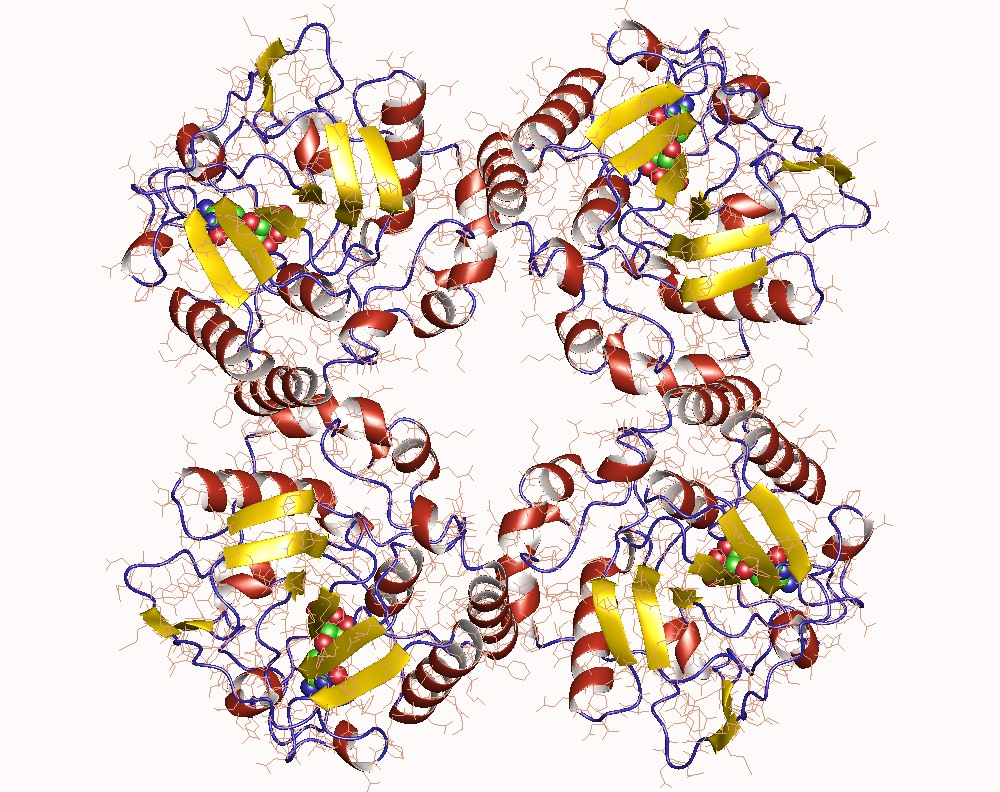
- Sialyltransferase CstII (alpha-2,3/8-sialyltransferase) homotetramer, Campylobacter jejuni

Identifiers
- Symbol: Glyco_transf_29
- Pfam: PF00777
- InterPro: IPR001675
- Membranome: 287
Available protein structures:
- PDB: IPR001675 PF00777 (ECOD; PDBsum)
- AlphaFold: IPR001675; PF00777

Sialyltransferases are enzymes that transfer sialic acid to nascent oligosaccharide. Each sialyltransferase is specific for a particular sugar substrate. Sialyltransferases add sialic acid to the terminal portions of the sialylated glycolipids (gangliosides) or to the N- or O-linked sugar chains of glycoproteins.

The biosynthesis of disaccharides, oligosaccharides and polysaccharides involves the action of hundreds of different glycosyltransferases. These enzymes catalyse the transfer of sugar moieties from activated donor molecules to specific acceptor molecules, forming glycosidic bonds. A classification of glycosyltransferases using nucleotide diphospho-sugar, nucleotide monophospho-sugar and sugar phosphates (EC 2.4.1.-) and related proteins into distinct sequence based families has been described. This classification is available on the CAZy (CArbohydrate-Active EnZymes) web site. The same three-dimensional fold is expected to occur within each of the families. Because 3-D structures are better conserved than sequences, several of the families defined on the basis of sequence similarities may have similar 3-D structures and therefore form 'clans'.

Sialyltransferases belong to glycosyltransferase family 29 (CAZY GT_29) which comprises enzymes with a number of known activities; sialyltransferase (EC 2.4.99), beta-galactosamide alpha-2,6-sialyltransferase (EC 2.4.99.1), alpha-N-acetylgalactosaminide alpha-2,6-sialyltransferase (EC 2.4.99.3), beta-galactoside alpha-2,3-sialyltransferase (EC 2.4.99.4), N-acetyllactosaminide alpha-2,3-sialyltransferase (EC 2.4.99.6), alpha-N-acetyl-neuraminide alpha-2,8-sialyltransferase (EC 2.4.99.8); lactosylceramide alpha-2,3-sialyltransferase (EC 2.4.99.9). These enzymes use a nucleotide monophosphosugar as the donor (CMP-NeuA) instead of a nucleotide diphosphosugar.

Sialyltransferase may be responsible for the synthesis of the sequence NEUAC-Alpha-2,3-GAL-Beta-1,3-GALNAC-, found on sugar chains O-linked to thr or ser and also as a terminal sequence on certain gangliosides. These enzymes catalyse sialyltransfer reactions during glycosylation, and are type II membrane proteins.

There are about twenty different sialyltransferases which can be distinguished on the basis of the acceptor structure on which they act and on the type of sugar linkage they form. For example, a group of sialyltransferases adds sialic acid with an alpha-2,3 linkage to galactose, while other sialyltransferases add sialic acid with an alpha-2,6 linkage to galactose or N-acetylgalactosamine. A peculiar type of sialyltransferases add sialic acid to other sialic acid units with an alpha-2,8 linkage, forming structures referred to as polysialic acid. As occurs for other glycosyltransferases, the expression of sialyltransferases undergoes profound modifications during cell differentiation and neoplastic transformation; in some cases such changes induce phenotypic alterations.

== Human proteins containing this domain ==
SIAT4C; SIAT9; ST3GAL1; ST3GAL2; ST3GAL3; ST3GAL4; ST3GAL5; ST3GAL6; ST3GalIII; ST6GAL1; ST6GAL2; ST6Gal; ST8SIA1; ST8SIA2; ST8SIA3; ST8SIA4; ST8SIA5; ST8SIA6; ST8Sia;
