= Protein-truncating variants =

Protein-truncating variants (PTVs) are genetic variants predicted to shorten the coding sequence of genes, through ways like a stop-gain mutation. PTV is sometime categorized under the umbrella term frameshift or truncating variants (FTVs), which includes both PTVs and DNA variants caused by frameshift mutation.

== Implication in diseases/disorders ==
It was believed that protein-truncating variants are not associated with human diseases. Recent studies have implied the involvement of PTVs in autism spectrum disorder.
