= Prion pseudoknot =

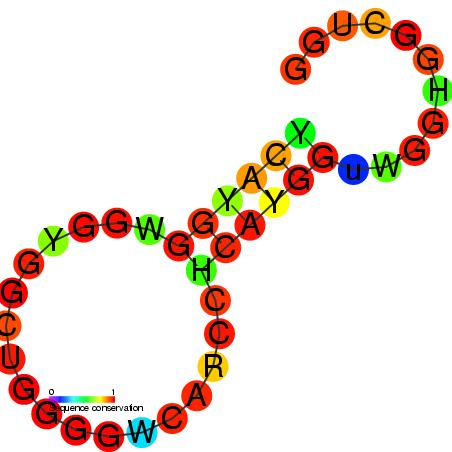
- Predicted secondary structure and sequence conservation of Prion_pknot

Identifiers
- Symbol: Prion_pknot
- Rfam: RF00523

Other data
- RNA type: Cis-reg
- Domain(s): Eukaryota
- SO: SO:0000233
- PDB structures: PDBe

The prion pseudoknot is predicted RNA pseudoknot structure found in prion protein mRNA. It has been suggested that this element has a possible effect in prion protein translation. The human prion protein gene contains 5 copies of a 24 nucleotide repeat that contains this structure. The number of nucleotide repeats found in an organism may vary from one organism to another. Each species has a set number of nucleotide repeats, but when the organism deviates from this number, mutations in the prion genes may arise. Human individuals that exhibit these mutations may be prone to developing prion diseases, such as Creutzfeldt-Jakob disease.
