= Diseases of abnormal polymerization =

Diseases of abnormal polymerization, or simply DAPs, are a class of disorders characterized by a novel alteration in base unit proteins that results in a structure with pathogenic potential. This functional alteration in a protein in relation to its thermodynamic and kinetic properties enacts an extended chain response among neighboring proteins until an extensive and potentially harmful polymerized structure is formed. Due to this endogenous foreign formation, these diseases are often untreatable and very severe in clinical manifestation. Although DAPs are rare infections, the poor outcome in patients and the need for further understanding makes this class of diseases a pillar for future research.

== Replication by recruitment ==
Diseases of abnormal polymerization are said to undergo "replication", or rather that the number of proteins that are polymerized is shown to generally increase much like in a natural course of infection. Since the functional "pathogens" of DAPs are protein units the diseases are almost entirely independent from the use of nucleic acids. Multiple models illustrating this recruitment function exist, including the PrP protein in prion disease. The PrP protein is the major agent in spongiform encephalopathies and undergoes a clear process of polymerization based upon the natural balancing of thermodynamic states and kinetic summation. Like most proteins PrP can exist in two forms, one major and one minor, an alpha helix structure and a beta-pleated sheet structure respectively, that are balanced during nearly all conditions, but with dominance granted to the stable helix form. In certain instances, it may be possible for two beta forms to contact each other at the same time, and in this case the pair can form bonds that successfully stabilize the beta forms thermodynamically and allowing these structures to remain. This is termed the "seed" of polymerization as from this point the continued interaction, or recruitment, amongst the beta forms is increased perpetually, since there is a constant presence of stable beta forms, as well as the fact that beta forms, or beta-pleated sheets, have a greater number of reactive nucleation sites. This progression forms extended fibrils slowly over time that will then cause localized cytopathology, resulting in the characteristic sites of cell degradation or "sponginess". This general template of recruitment is also characteristic in the condition sickle cell anemia in which the red blood cells are misshapen because of the formation of extended polymer fibrils.

== Scenarios for pathogenesis ==
=== Spontaneous development ===
ADPs can be generated in a spontaneous nature by the existence of multiple thermodynamic states and the kinetic equilibrium between the alpha helix and beta-pleated sheets polymerizing into extended fibrils.

=== Genetic predisposition ===
In certain ADPs, such as Gerstmann-Straussler or fatal familial insomnia, individuals naturally encode a form of the PrP protein that shifts the equilibrium slightly to make the beta form more favorable, thus increasing the likelihood of additional nucleation and extended polymerization.

=== Infectious etiology ===
Many ADPs, including Creutzfeldt-Jakob disease and Kuru, have an infectious nature and can be transmitted to other hosts through various means. In the case of Kuru, familial and cultural rituals in indigenous peoples of Papua New Guinea promoted the consumption of a relative's body upon death, and if contaminated, resulting in the transmission of the original "seed" of polymerization.

== Examples ==
- Spongiform encephalopathies Prion Disease (Kuru, CJD, GSS, BSE)
- Alzheimer's disease
- Sickle cell anemia
- Parkinson's disease
- Huntington's disease

== See also ==
- Proteinopathy
