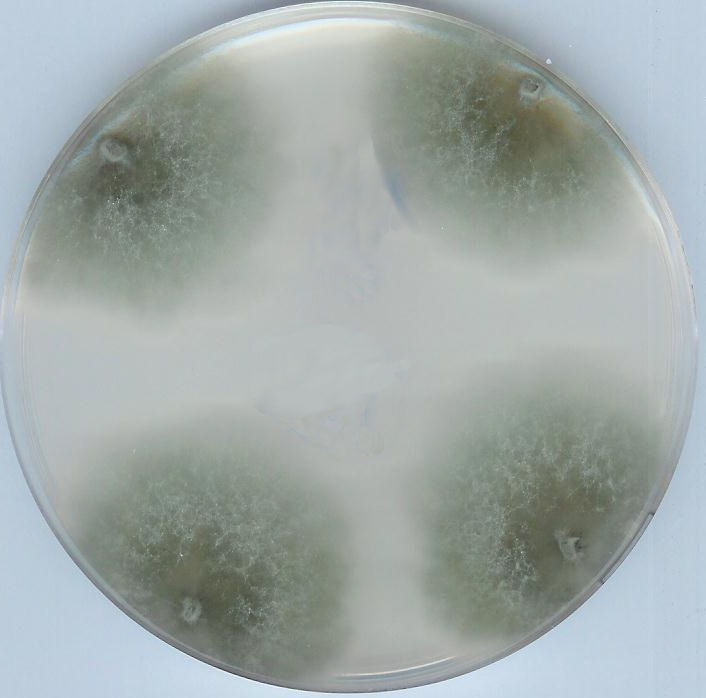
- Wild-type strain on a Petri dish

Scientific classification
- Kingdom: Fungi
- Division: Ascomycota
- Class: Sordariomycetes
- Order: Sordariales
- Family: Podosporaceae
- Genus: Podospora
- Species: P. anserina

Binomial name
- Podospora anserina (Rabenh.) Niessl (1883)

Synonyms
- Malinvernia anserina Rabenh. (1857); Sordaria anserina (Rabenh.) G.Winter (1873); Pleurage anserina (Rabenh.) Kuntze (1898)

= Podospora anserina =

Species of fungus

Podospora anserina is a filamentous ascomycete fungus from the order Sordariales. It is considered a model organism for the study of molecular biology of senescence (aging), prions, sexual reproduction, and meiotic drive. It has an obligate sexual and pseudohomothallic life cycle. It is a non-pathogenic coprophilous fungus that colonizes the dung of herbivorous animals such as horses, rabbits, cows and sheep.

== Taxonomy ==
Podospora anserina was originally named Malinvernia anserina Rabenhorst (1857). Podospora anserina was subsequently published in Niessl (1883), which is used today to reference the common laboratory strain therefrom, 'Niessl'. It is also known as Pleurage anserina (Ces.) Kuntze. Genetics of P. anserina were characterized in Rizet and Engelmann (1949) and reviewed by Esser (1974). P. anserina is estimated to have diverged from Neurospora crassa 75 million years ago based on 18S rRNA and protein orthologous share 60-70% homology. Gene cluster orthologs between Aspergillus nidulans and Podospora anserina have 63% identical primary amino acid sequence (even though these species are from distinct classes) and the average amino acid of compared proteomes is 10% less, giving rise to hypotheses of distinct species yet shared genes.

== Research ==
Podospora is a model organism to study genetics, aging (senescence, cell degeneration), ascomycete development, heterokaryon incompatibility, mating in fungi, prions, and mitochondrial and peroxisomal physiology. Podospora is easily culturable on complex (full) potato dextrose, cornmeal agar/broth, or even synthetic medium, and, using modern molecular tools, is easy to manipulate. Its optimal growth temperature is 25–27 °C (77–81 °F) and can complete its life cycle in 7 to 11 days under laboratory conditions.

=== Strains ===
Most research has been done in a small collection of French strains sampled in the 1920s, in particular the strains named S and s. These two strains are known to be very similar except for the het-s locus. The reference genome published in 2008 corresponds to S+, a haploid derivate of the S strain with a + mating type.

In addition, two other populations have been sampled, one in Usingen, Germany, and the other in Wageningen, the Netherlands, both of which have been used to study spore killing, the phenotypic expression of meiotic drive in fungi.

In addition there are multiple lab-derived strains:

- ΔPaKu70 is used to increase homologous recombination in protoplasts during transformations in order to create desirable gene deletions or allelic mutations. A ΔPaKu70 strain can be achieved by transforming protoplasts with linear DNA that flanks the PaKu70 gene along with an antibiotic cassette and then selecting for strains and verifying by PCR. Derived from the s strain.
- Mn19 is a long-lived strain used to study senescence. It is derived from strain A+-84-11 grown on manganese (Mn). This particular strain has been reported to have lived over 2 years in a race tube covering over 400 cm (160 in) of vegetative growth.
- ΔiΔviv is an immortal strain that shows no sign of senescence. It produces yellow pigmentation. Lack of viv increased life span in days by a factor of 2.3 compared to the wild type and lack of i by 1.6. However, strain ΔiΔviv showed no senescence during the whole study and was vegetative for over a year. These genes are synergistic and are physically closely linked.
- AL2 is a long-lived strain. Insertion of linear mitochondrial plasmid containing al-2 show increased life span. However, natural isolates that have homology to al-2 do not show increased life span.
- Δgrisea is a long-lived strain and copper uptake mutant. This strain has lower affinity to copper and thus lower intracellular copper levels, leading to use of the cyanide-resistant alternative oxidase, PaAOX, pathway (instead of copper-dependent mitochondrial cytochrome c oxidase (COX) complex). This strain also exhibits more stable mtDNA. Copper use is similar to Δex1 strain.
- Δex1 is an 'immortal strain' that has been grown for over 12 years and still shows no signs of senescence. This strain respires via a cyanide-resistant, salicylhydroxamic acid (SHAM)-sensitive pathway. This deletion disrupts the COX complex.

=== Aging ===
Podospora anserina has a definite life span and shows senescence phenotypically (by slower growth, less aerial hyphae, and increased pigment production in distal hyphae). However, isolates show either increased life span or immortality, as to study the process of aging many genetic manipulations have been done to produce immortal strains or increase life-span. In general, the mitochondrion and mitochondrial chromosome is investigated.

Senescence occurs because during respiration reactive oxygen species are produced that limit the life span and over time defective mitochondrial DNA can accumulate. With this knowledge, focus turned to nutrition availability, respiration (ATP synthesis) and oxidases, such as cytochrome c oxidase. Carotenoids, pigments that are also found in plants and provide health benefits to humans, are known to be in fungi like Podospora's divergent ancestor Neurospora crassa; in N. crassa (and other fungi) cartenoids al genes namely provide UV radiation protection. Over-expression of al-2 Podospora anserina increased life span by 31%.

Calorie restriction studies show that decreasing nutrients, such as sugar, increased life span, likely due to slower metabolism and thus decreased reactive oxygen species production or induced survival genes. Also, intracellular copper levels were found to be correlated with growth. This was studied in Grisea-deleted and ex1-deleted strains, as well as in a wild type s strain. Podospora without Grisea, a copper transcription factor, had decreased intracellular copper levels which lead to use of an alternative respiratory pathway that consequently produced less oxidative stress.

In the P. anserina aging model, autophagy, a pathway for the degradation of damaged biomolecules and organelles, was shown to be a longevity assurance mechanism.

=== Heterokaryon incompatibility ===
The following genes, both allelic and nonallelic, are found to be involved in vegetative incompatibility (only those cloned and characterized are listed): het-c, het-c, het-s, idi-2, idi-1, idi-3, mod-A, mode-D, mod-E, psp-A. Podospora anserina contains at least 9 het loci.

=== Enzymes ===
Podospora anserina is known to produce laccases, a type of phenoloxidase.

== Genetics ==
Original genetic studies by gel electrophoresis led to the finding of the genome size, c. 35 megabases, with 7 chromosomes and 1 mitochondrial chromosome. In the 1980s the mitochondrial chromosome was sequenced. Then, in 2003, a pilot study was initiated to sequence regions bordering chromosome V's centromere using BAC clones and direct sequencing. In 2008, a 10x whole genome draft sequence was published. The genome size is now estimated to be 35-36 megabases.

Genetic manipulation in fungi is difficult due to low homologous recombination efficiency and ectopic integrations which hinders genetic studies using allele replacement and knock-outs. In 2005, a method for gene deletion was developed based on a model for Aspergillus nidulans that involved cosmid plasmid transformation. A better system for Podospora was developed in 2008 by using a strain that lacked nonhomologous end joining proteins (Ku (protein), known in Podospora as PaKu70). This method claimed to have 100% of transformants undergo desired homologous recombination leading to allelic replacement, and after the transformation, the PaKu70 deletion can be restored by crossing over with a wild-type strain to yield progeny with only the targeted gene deletion or allelic exchange (e.g. point mutation).

== Secondary metabolites ==
It is well known that many organisms across all domains produce secondary metabolites, and fungi are prolific in this regard. Product mining was well underway in the 1990s for the genus Podospora. From Podospora anserina two new natural products classified as pentaketides, specifically derivatives of benzoquinones, were discovered; these showed antifungal, antibacterial, and cytotoxic activities. Horizontal gene transfer is common in bacteria and between prokaryotes and eukaryotes yet is more rare between eukaryotic organisms. Between fungi, secondary metabolite clusters are good candidates for horizontal gene transfer, for example, a functional ST gene cluster that produces sterigmatocystin was found in Podospora anserina and originally derived from Aspergillus. This cluster is well-conserved, including, notably, the transcription-factor binding sites. Sterigmatocystin itself is toxic and is a precursor to another toxic metabolite, aflatoxin.

== See also ==
- Fungal prions
- PXMP3
- Virus classification
- OLIGO Primer Analysis Software
- Point mutation
- Amyloid
