= Ure2p =

Yeast protein

Transcriptional regulator URE2

Identifiers
- Organism: Saccharomyces cerevisiae strain S288c
- Symbol: URE2
- Entrez: 855492
- HomoloGene: 22221
- RefSeq (mRNA): NM_001183067.1
- RefSeq (Prot): NP_014170.1
- UniProt: P23202

Other data
- Chromosome: XIV: 0.22 - 0.22 Mb
Search for
- Structures: Swiss-model
- Domains: InterPro

Ure2p is a yeast protein that represses transcription of genes involved in nitrogen catabolism. It specifically regulates the utilization of poor nitrogen sources in the presence of preferred nutrients such as ammonia or glutamine. Ure2p is one of the few yeast proteins that are known to be prions. At low frequency the protein adopts an alternative conformation that is auto-catalytic and self-propagating. Yeast cells that carry the protein in the prion conformation are designated as [URE3]. Autocatalytic conversion of Ure2p into the inactive prion form of the protein results in a loss of repression of nitrogen catabolic genes.
