= ST8SIA2 =

Protein-coding gene in the species Homo sapiens

Identifiers
- Aliases: ST8SIA2, HsT19690, SIAT8B, ST8SIA-II, STX, ST8 alpha-N-acetyl-neuraminide alpha-2,8-sialyltransferase 2, SIAT8-B, ST8SiaII
- External IDs: OMIM: 602546; MGI: 106020; GeneCards: ST8SIA2

Gene location (Human)
| Chr. | Chromosome 15 (human) |
| Band | 15q26.1 | Start | 92,393,881 bp |
| Band | 15q26.1 | End | 92,468,728 bp |

Gene location (Mouse)
| Chr. | Chromosome 7 (mouse) |
| Band | 7|7 D1 | Start | 73,588,867 bp |
| Band | 7|7 D1 | End | 73,663,438 bp |
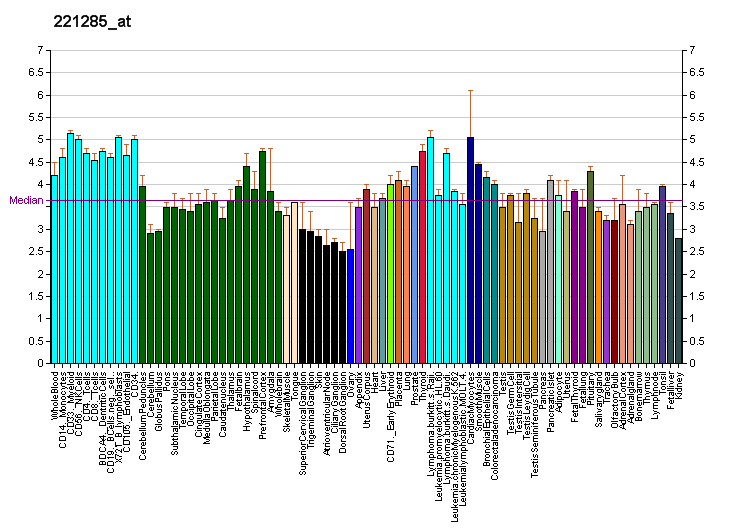
RNA expression pattern
| Bgee | Human / Mouse (ortholog); Top expressed in: ganglionic eminence; ventricular zone; testicle; left ventricle; apex of heart; prefrontal cortex; retinal pigment epithelium; hypothalamus; gonad; cingulate gyrus / Top expressed in: Rostral migratory stream; internal carotid artery; external carotid artery; ganglionic eminence; medial ganglionic eminence; vestibular sensory epithelium; epithelium of lens; neural tube; ventricular zone; utricle; More reference expression data |
| BioGPS | More reference expression data |
Gene ontology
| Molecular function | transferase activity; glycosyltransferase activity; sialyltransferase activity; sialic acid binding; alpha-N-acetylneuraminate alpha-2,8-sialyltransferase activity |
| Cellular component | integral component of membrane; recycling endosome; Golgi apparatus; membrane; Golgi membrane; early endosome |
| Biological process | N-glycan processing; ganglioside biosynthetic process; nervous system development; protein glycosylation; oligosaccharide metabolic process; sialylation; carbohydrate metabolic process |
Sources:Amigo / QuickGO
Orthologs
| Databases | NCBI: entry; OMA: entry |
| Species | Human | Mouse |
| Entrez | 8128 | 20450 |
| Ensembl | ENSG00000140557 | ENSMUSG00000025789 |
| UniProt | Q92186 | O35696 |
| RefSeq (mRNA) | NM_006011; NM_001330416 | NM_009181 |
| RefSeq (protein) | NP_001317345; NP_006002; NP_006002.1 | NP_033207 |
| Location (UCSC) | Chr 15: 92.39 – 92.47 Mb | Chr 7: 73.59 – 73.66 Mb |
| PubMed search |
- Wikidata
| View/Edit Human | View/Edit Mouse |

Alpha-2,8-sialyltransferase 8B is an enzyme that in humans is encoded by the ST8SIA2 gene.

== Function ==
The protein encoded by this gene is a type II membrane protein that is thought to catalyze the transfer of sialic acid from CMP-sialic acid to N-linked oligosaccharides and glycoproteins. The encoded protein may be found in the Golgi apparatus and may be involved in the production of polysialic acid, a modulator of the adhesive properties of neural cell adhesion molecule (NCAM1). This protein is a member of glycosyltransferase family 29.
