= ST6GAL1 =

Identifiers
- Aliases: ST6GAL1, SIAT1, ST6GalI, ST6N, ST6 beta-galactoside alpha-2,6-sialyltransferase 1, CDw75
- External IDs: OMIM: 109675; MGI: 108470; GeneCards: ST6GAL1
Available structures
PDB	Ortholog search: PDBe RCSB
PDB	List of PDB id codes 4JS1, 4JS2
Enzyme activity
EC #	BRENDA	ExPASy	KEGG	MetaCyc
2.4.3.1	↗	↗	↗	↗

Gene location (Human)
Chr.	Chromosome 3 (human)
Band	3q27.3	Start	186,930,325 bp
Band	3q27.3	End	187,078,553 bp

Gene location (Mouse)
Chr.	Chromosome 16 (mouse)
Band	16 B1|16 14.03 cM	Start	23,043,490 bp
Band	16 B1|16 14.03 cM	End	23,179,100 bp
RNA expression pattern
Bgee	Human / Mouse (ortholog); Top expressed in: liver; right lobe of liver; renal medulla; lymph node; bone marrow cell; epithelium of nasopharynx; nasal epithelium; urethra; bronchus; epithelium of bronchus / Top expressed in: sciatic nerve; utricle; iris; Rostral migratory stream; condyle; Paneth cell; motor neuron; primitive streak; left lung lobe; facial motor nucleus; More reference expression data
BioGPS	n/a
Gene ontology
Molecular function	transferase activity; glycosyltransferase activity; protein binding; sialyltransferase activity; beta-galactoside alpha-2,6-sialyltransferase activity; protein homodimerization activity
Cellular component	integral component of membrane; Golgi apparatus; membrane; Golgi cisterna membrane; extracellular region; Golgi membrane
Biological process	sialylation; protein glycosylation; humoral immune response; O-glycan processing; oligosaccharide metabolic process; N-acetylneuraminate metabolic process; protein N-linked glycosylation via asparagine
Sources:Amigo / QuickGO
Orthologs
Databases	NCBI: entry; OMA: entry
Species	Human	Mouse
Entrez	6480	20440
Ensembl	ENSG00000073849	ENSMUSG00000022885
UniProt	P15907	Q64685
RefSeq (mRNA)	NM_003032; NM_173216; NM_173217; NM_001353916	NM_001252505; NM_001252506; NM_145933
RefSeq (protein)	NP_003023; NP_775323; NP_775324; NP_001340845	NP_001239434; NP_001239435; NP_666045
Location (UCSC)	Chr 3: 186.93 – 187.08 Mb	Chr 16: 23.04 – 23.18 Mb
PubMed search
- Wikidata
View/Edit Human	View/Edit Mouse

Beta-galactoside alpha-2,6-sialyltransferase 1 is an enzyme that in humans is encoded by the ST6GAL1 gene.

The protein encoded by this gene is a type II membrane protein that catalyzes the transfer of sialic acid from CMP-sialic acid to galactose-containing substrates. The encoded protein, which is normally found in the Golgi but which can be proteolytically processed to a soluble form, is involved in the generation of the cell-surface carbohydrate determinants and differentiation antigens HB-6, CDw75, and CD76. This protein is a member of glycosyltransferase family 29. Three transcript variants encoding two different isoforms have been found for this gene.

Transcripts of ST6GAL1 are found in mouse high endothelial cells of mesenteric lymph node and Peyer's patches, and it could be involved in the B cell homing to Peyer's patches. ST6GAL1 expression has also shown to be upregulated in several types of cancers and has been shown to haves roles in cancer survival and metastasis.
