= Reed Wickner =

American geneticist

- Born: About 1942
- Education: Cornell University (B.A.) Georgetown University (M.D)
- Known for: Work on prions and amyloid diseases
- Scientific career
- Fields: Yeast genetics
- Institutions: National Institute of Diabetes & Digestive & Kidney Diseases, National Institutes of Health

Reed B. Wickner (born c. 1942) is an American yeast geneticist. In 1994 he proposed that the [PSI+] and [URE3] phenotypes in Saccharomyces cerevisiae, a form of budding yeast, were caused by prion forms of native proteins - specifically, the Sup35p and Ure2p proteins, respectively.

Wickner graduated from Cornell University with a B.A. degree in 1962. He then went to medical school at Georgetown University and received his M.D. degree in 1966. He is a member of the National Academy of Sciences (NAS), the American Academy of Arts and Sciences [(AAAS)], and the American Academy of Microbiology, and has been a fellow of the American Association for the Advancement of Science. He is (as of 2012) Chief of the Laboratory of Biochemistry and Genetics at the National Institute of Diabetes & Digestive & Kidney Diseases, part of the National Institutes of Health. His research interests pertain to prions and amyloid diseases.
