= Nonsense mutation =

Type of mutation in a DNA sequence

In genetics, a nonsense mutation is a point mutation in a sequence of DNA that results in a nonsense codon, or a premature stop codon in the transcribed mRNA, and leads to a truncated, incomplete, and possibly nonfunctional protein product. Nonsense mutations are not always harmful; the functional effect of a nonsense mutation depends on many aspects, such as the location of the stop codon within the coding DNA. For example, the effect of a nonsense mutation depends on the proximity of the nonsense mutation to the original stop codon, and the degree to which functional subdomains of the protein are affected. As nonsense mutations lead to premature termination of polypeptide chains, they are also called chain termination mutations.

Missense mutations differ from nonsense mutations since they are point mutations that exhibit a single nucleotide change to cause substitution of a different amino acid. A nonsense mutation also differs from a nonstop mutation, which is a point mutation that removes a stop codon. About 10% of patients facing genetic diseases have involvement with nonsense mutations. Some of the diseases that these mutations can cause are Duchenne muscular dystrophy (DMD), cystic fibrosis (CF), spinal muscular atrophy (SMA), cancers, metabolic diseases, and neurologic disorders. The rate of nonsense mutations is variable from gene-to-gene and tissue-to-tissue, but gene silencing occurs in every patient with a nonsense mutation.

== Simple example ==
    DNA: 5′—ATG ACT CAC CGA GCG CGA AGC TGA—3′
         3′—TAC TGA GTG GCT CGC GCT TCG ACT—5′
   mRNA: 5′—AUG ACU CAC CGA GCG CGA AGC UGA—3′
Protein:  N—Met Thr His Arg Ala Arg Ser Stop—C

The example above begins with a 5' DNA sequence with 24 nucleotides (8 triplet codons) seen and its complementary strand shown below. The next row highlights the 5' mRNA strand, which is generated through transcription. Lastly, the final row showcases which amino acids are translated from each respective codon, with the eighth and final codon representing the stop codon. The codons corresponding to the fourth amino acid, Arginine (Arg), are highlighted because they will undergo a nonsense mutation in the following figure of this example.

    DNA: 5′—ATG ACT CAC TGA GCG CGA AGC TGA—3′
         3′—TAC TGA GTG ACT CGC GCT TCG ACT—5′
   mRNA: 5′—AUG ACU CAC UGA GCG CGU AGC UGA—3′
Protein:  N—Met Thr His Stop—C

Now, suppose that a nonsense mutation was introduced at the fourth codon in the 5′ DNA sequence (CGA) causing the cytosine to be replaced with thymine, yielding TGA in the 5′ DNA sequence and ACT in the complementary strand. Because ACT is transcribed as UGA, it is translated as a stop codon. This leads the remaining codons of the mRNA to not be translated into protein because the stop codon is prematurely reached during translation. This can yield a truncated (i.e., abbreviated) protein product, which quite often lacks the functionality of the normal, non-mutant protein.

All possible nonsense mutations
| amber (UAG) mutations | ochre (UAA) mutations | opal (UGA) mutations |
|---|---|---|
| AAG (Lys) → UAG (stop); CAG (Gln) → UAG (stop); GAG (Glu) → UAG (stop); UCG (Ser) → UAG (stop); UGG (Trp) → UAG (stop); UUG (Leu) → UAG (stop); UAC (Tyr) → UAG (stop); UAU (Tyr) → UAG (stop) | AAA (Lys) → UAA (stop); CAA (Gln) → UAA (stop); GAA (Glu) → UAA (stop); UCA (Ser) → UAA (stop); UUA (Leu) → UAA (stop); UAC (Tyr) → UAA (stop); UAU (Tyr) → UAA (stop) | AGA (Arg) → UGA (stop); CGA (Arg) → UGA (stop); GGA (Gly) → UGA (stop); UCA (Ser) → UGA (stop); UUA (Leu) → UGA (stop); UGC (Cys) → UGA (stop); UGG (Trp) → UGA (stop); UGU (Cys) → UGA (stop) |

== Possible outcomes ==
=== Deleterious ===
Deleterious outcomes represent the majority of nonsense mutations and are the most common outcome that is observed naturally. Deleterious nonsense mutations decrease the overall fitness and reproductive success of the organism. For example, a nonsense mutation occurring in a gene encoding a protein can cause structural or functional defects in the protein that disrupt cellular biology. Depending on the significance of the functions of this protein, this disruption could be detrimental to the fitness and survival of that organism.

=== Neutral ===
When a nonsense mutation is neutral, it does not provide benefits or harm. These occur when the effects of the mutation are unnoticed. In other words, this means that the mutation does not positively or negatively affect the organism. As this effect is unnoticed, there is a lack of papers describing such mutations. An example of this type of nonsense mutation is one that occurs directly before the original stop codon for that given protein. Because this mutation occurred in such close proximity to the end of the protein chain, the impact of this change might not be as significant. This would suggest that this amino acid that was mutated did not have a large impact on the overall structure or function of the protein or the organism as a whole. This scenario is rare, but possible.

=== Beneficial ===
Beneficial nonsense mutations are considered as the rarest of possible nonsense mutation outcomes. Beneficial nonsense mutations increase the overall fitness and reproductive success of an organism, opposite of the effects of a deleterious mutation. Because a nonsense mutation introduces a premature stop codon within a sequence of DNA, it is extremely unlikely that this scenario can actually benefit the organism. An example of this would occur with a nonsense mutation that impacts a dysfunctional protein that releases toxins. The stop codon that this mutation brings would stop this dysfunctional protein from properly carrying out its function. Stopping this protein from performing at full strength causes less toxin to be released and the fitness of the organism to be improved. These types of situations with nonsense mutations occur a lot less frequently than the deleterious outcomes.

== Suppressing nonsense mutations ==
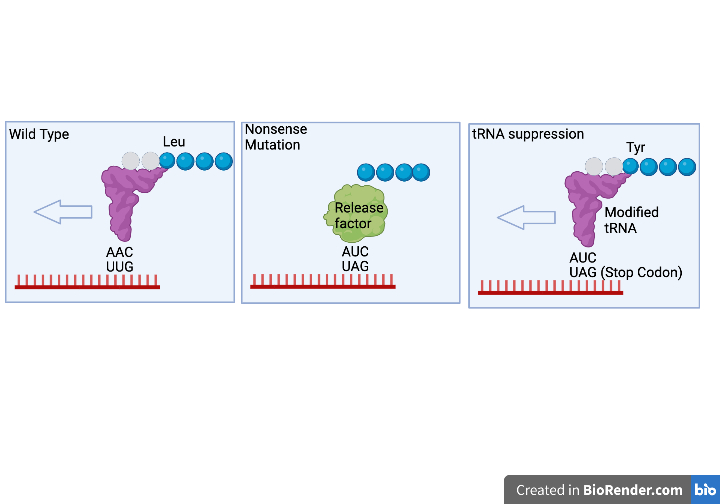
Pictured on the left is a diagram of normal translation occurring without mutation. Blue circles are the peptides already translated while the grey circles are peptides going to be translated next. In the center is a diagram a nonsense mutation where the UUG codon is translated to the stop codon UAG. The stop codon recruits a release factor, terminating translation. On the right is a diagram of the tRNA suppression mechanism where the codon and the tRNA are both mutated, resulting in tRNA suppression. The mutated Tyr tRNA has the anticodon AUC which recognizes the UAG stop codon, continuing protein translation.

Nonsense-mediated mRNA decay

Despite an expected tendency for premature termination codons to yield shortened polypeptide products, in fact the formation of truncated proteins does not occur often in vivo. Many organisms—including humans and lower species, such as yeast—employ a nonsense-mediated mRNA decay pathway, which degrades mRNAs containing nonsense mutations before they are able to be translated into nonfunctional polypeptides.

tRNA Suppression

Because nonsense mutations result in altered mRNA with a premature stop codon, one way of suppressing the damage done to the final protein's function is to alter the tRNA that reads the mRNA. These tRNA’s are termed suppressor tRNA's. If the stop codon is UAG, any other amino acid tRNA could be altered from its original anticodon to AUC so it will recognize the UAG codon instead. This will result in the protein not being truncated, but it may still have an altered amino acid. These suppressor tRNA mutations are only possible if the cell has more than one tRNA that reads a particular codon, otherwise the mutation would kill the cell. The only stop codons are UAG, UAA, and UGA. UAG and UAA suppressors read their respective stop codons instead of their original codon, but UAA suppressors also read UAG due to wobble base pairing. UGA suppressors are very rare. Another hurdle to pass in this technique is the fact that stop codons are also recognized by release factors, so the tRNA still needs to compete with the release factors to keep the translation going. Because of this, suppression is usually only 10-40% successful. These suppressor tRNA mutations also target stop codons that are not mutations, causing some proteins to be much longer than they should be. Only bacteria and lower eukaryotes can survive with these mutations, mammal and insect cells die as a result of a suppressor mutation.

For historical reasons the three stop codons were given names (see Stop codons): UAG is called the amber codon, UAA is called the ochre codon, and UGA is called the opal codon.

== Common disease-associated nonsense mutations ==
Selection of notable mutations, ordered in a standard table of the genetic code of amino acids. nonsense mutations are marked by red arrows.

Nonsense mutations comprise around 20% of single nucleotide substitutions within protein coding sequences that result in human disease. Nonsense mutation-mediated pathology is often attributed to reduced amounts of full-length protein, because only 5-25% of transcripts possessing nonsense mutations do not undergo nonsense-mediated decay (NMD). Translation of the remaining nonsense-bearing mRNA may generate abbreviated protein variants with toxic effects.

Twenty-three different single-point nucleotide substitutions are capable of converting a non-stop codon into a stop-codon, with the mutations CGA$\longrightarrow$TGA and CAG$\longrightarrow$TAG being the most common disease-related substitutions characterized in the Human Gene Mutation Database (HGMD). As a result of different substitution frequencies for each nucleotide, the proportions of the three stop codons generated by disease-inducing nonsense mutations differs from stop codon distributions in non-diseased gene variants. Notably, the codon TAG is overrepresented, while the TGA and TAA codons are underrepresented in disease-related nonsense mutations.

Translation termination efficiency is influenced by the specific stop codon sequence on the mRNA, with the UAA sequence yielding the highest termination. Sequences surrounding the stop codon also impact termination efficiency. Consequently, the underlying pathology of diseases caused by nonsense mutations is ultimately dependent on the identity of the mutated gene, and specific location of the mutation.

Examples of diseases induced by nonsense mutations include:

- Cystic fibrosis (caused by the G542X mutation in the cystic fibrosis transmembrane conductance regulator (CFTR)
- Beta thalassaemia (β-globin)
- Hurler syndrome
- Dravet syndrome
- Usher syndrome

Nonsense mutations in other genes may also drive dysfunction of several tissue or organ systems:

SMAD8

SMAD8 is the eighth homolog of the ENDOGLIN gene family and is involved in the signaling between TGF-b/BMP. It has been identified that novel nonsense mutations in SMAD8 are associated with pulmonary arterial hypertension. The pulmonary system relies on SMAD1, SMAD5, and SMAD 8 to regulate pulmonary vascular function. Downregulation and loss of signals that are normally operated by SMAD8 contributed to pathogenesis in pulmonary arterial hypertension. The ALK1 gene, a part of the TGF-B signaling family, was found to have been mutated while also down-regulating the SMAD8 gene in patients with pulmonary arterial hypertension. SMAD8 mutants were not phosphorylated by ALK1, disrupting interactions with SMAD4 that would normally allow for signaling in wild-type organisms.

=== LGR4 ===
LGR4 binds R-spondins to activate the Wnt signaling pathway. Wnt signaling regulates bone mass and osteoblast differentiation and is important for the development of bone, heart, and muscle. An LGR4 nonsense mutation in a healthy population has been linked to low bone mass density and symptoms of osteoporosis. LGR4 mutant mice showed the observed low bone mass is not due to age-related bone loss. Mutations in LGR4 have been associated with family lineages with medical histories of rare bone disorders. Wild-type mice lacking LGR4 also displayed delayed osteoblast differentiation during development, showcasing the important role of LGR4 in bone mass regulation and development.

== Therapeutics targeting nonsense mutation diseases ==
Therapeutics for diseases caused by nonsense mutations attempt to recapitulate wild-type function by decreasing the efficacy of NMD, facilitating readthrough of the premature stop codon during translation, or editing the genomic nonsense mutation.

Antisense oligonucleotides to suppress the expression of NMD and translation termination proteins are being explored in animal models of nonsense mutation-induced disease. Other RNA therapeutics under investigation include synthetic suppressor tRNAs that enable ribosomes to insert an amino acid, instead of initiating chain termination, upon encountering premature stop codons.

CRISPR-Cas9 based single nucleotide substitutions have been used to generate amino acid codons from stop codons, achieving an editing success rate of 10% in cell cultures.

Read-through has been achieved using small molecule drugs such as aminoglycosides and negamycin. An oxadiazole, ataluren (previously PTC124), facilitates the selective read-through of aberrant stop codons, rendering it a potential therapeutic against nonsense mutation-induced disease. Ataluren, sold under the tradename Translarna, is currently an approved treatment for Duchenne muscular dystrophy in the European Economic area and Brazil. However, phase III trials of Ataluren as a cystic fibrosis therapeutic have failed to meet their primary endpoints.

== See also ==
- Emily's Entourage, a cystic fibrosis nonprofit researching nonsense mutations
- Missense mutation
- Nonsense suppressor
- Protein-truncating variants
