= ST8SIA4 =

Protein-coding gene in the species Homo sapiens

Identifiers
- Aliases: ST8SIA4, PST, PST1, SIAT8D, ST8SIA-IV, ST8 alpha-N-acetyl-neuraminide alpha-2,8-sialyltransferase 4
- External IDs: OMIM: 602547; MGI: 106018; GeneCards: ST8SIA4

Gene location (Human)
Chr.	Chromosome 5 (human)
Band	5q21.1	Start	100,806,933 bp
Band	5q21.1	End	100,903,282 bp

Gene location (Mouse)
Chr.	Chromosome 1 (mouse)
Band	1|1 D	Start	95,587,682 bp
Band	1|1 D	End	95,667,571 bp
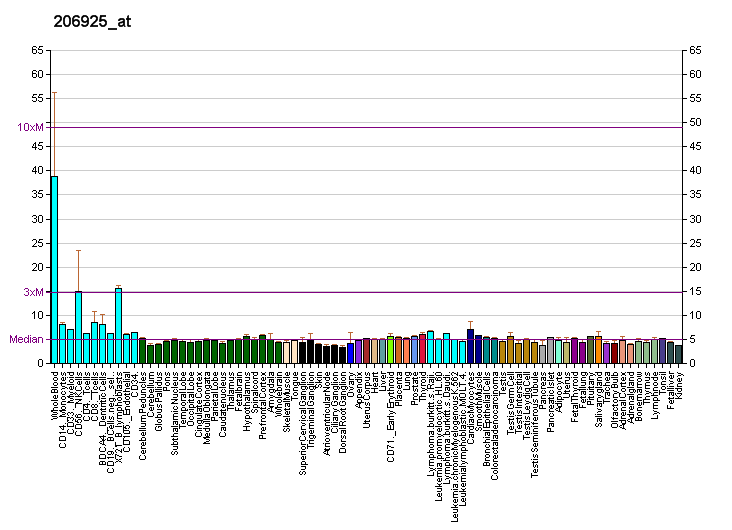
RNA expression pattern
Bgee	Human / Mouse (ortholog); Top expressed in: bronchial epithelial cell; blood; monocyte; trabecular bone; cartilage tissue; visceral pleura; granulocyte; bone marrow; lymph node; amniotic fluid / Top expressed in: fossa; median eminence; Rostral migratory stream; medial ganglionic eminence; blood; motor neuron; substantia nigra; suprachiasmatic nucleus; superior cervical ganglion; supraoptic nucleus; More reference expression data
BioGPS	More reference expression data
Gene ontology
Molecular function	sialyltransferase activity; sialic acid binding; glycosyltransferase activity; transferase activity; alpha-N-acetylneuraminate alpha-2,8-sialyltransferase activity
Cellular component	integral component of membrane; Golgi membrane; membrane; Golgi apparatus
Biological process	nervous system development; protein glycosylation; N-glycan processing; ganglioside biosynthetic process; oligosaccharide metabolic process; sialylation
Sources:Amigo / QuickGO
Orthologs
Databases	NCBI: entry; OMA: entry
Species	Human	Mouse
Entrez	7903	20452
Ensembl	ENSG00000113532	ENSMUSG00000040710
UniProt	Q92187	Q64692
RefSeq (mRNA)	NM_005668; NM_175052	NM_001159745; NM_009183
RefSeq (protein)	NP_005659; NP_778222	NP_001153217; NP_033209
Location (UCSC)	Chr 5: 100.81 – 100.9 Mb	Chr 1: 95.59 – 95.67 Mb
PubMed search
- Wikidata
View/Edit Human	View/Edit Mouse

CMP-N-acetylneuraminate-poly-alpha-2,8-sialyltransferase is an enzyme that in humans is encoded by the ST8SIA4 gene.

The protein encoded by this gene catalyzes the polycondensation of alpha-2,8-linked sialic acid required for the synthesis of polysialic acid, a modulator of the adhesive properties of neural cell adhesion molecule (NCAM1). The encoded protein, which is a member of glycosyltransferase family 29, is a type II membrane protein that may be present in the Golgi apparatus. Two transcript variants encoding different isoforms have been found for this gene.
