= Sup35p =

Eukaryotic peptide chain release factor GTP-binding subunit

Identifiers
- Organism: Saccharomyces cerevisiae strain S288c
- Symbol: Sus35
- Entrez: 851752
- HomoloGene: 68226
- RefSeq (mRNA): NM_001180479.3
- RefSeq (Prot): NP_010457.3
- UniProt: P05453

Other data
- Chromosome: IV: 0.81 - 0.81 Mb
Search for
- Structures: Swiss-model
- Domains: InterPro

Sup35p is the Saccharomyces cerevisiae (a yeast) eukaryotic translation release factor. More specifically, it is the yeast eukaryotic release factor 3 (eRF3), which forms the translation termination complex with eRF1 (Sup45p in yeast). This complex recognizes and catalyzes the release of the nascent polypeptide chain when the ribosome encounters a stop codon. While eRF1 recognizes stop codons, eRF3 facilitates the release of the polypeptide chain through GTP hydrolysis.

Partial loss of function results in nonsense suppression, in which stop codons are ignored and proteins are abnormally synthesized with carboxyl terminal extensions. Complete loss of function is fatal.

== History ==
Sup35p was shown to propagate in a prion form in 1994 by Reed Wickner. For this reason it is an intensely studied protein. When yeast cells harbor Sup35p in the prion state the resulting phenotype is known as [PSI+]. In [PSI+] cells Sup35p exists in an amyloid state that can be propagated and passed to daughter cells. This results in less soluble and functional protein and thus in an increased rate of nonsense suppression (translational read-through of stop codons).

The overexpression of the gene has been shown to induce the [Psi+] conformation.

== Evolutionary capacitance ==
Several journal articles have suggested that the ability to interconvert between [PSI+] and [psi-](prion-free) states provides an evolutionary advantage, but this remains an area of much debate.

Susan Lindquist has shown that isogenic populations of yeast can express different phenotypes based on whether they had the prion form of Sup35p or the non-prion form. She did an experiment where seven strains of yeast with different genetic backgrounds were grown under many different stressful conditions, with matched [PSI+] and [psi-] strains. In some cases, the [PSI+] version grew faster, in others [psi-] grew faster. She proposed that [PSI+] may act as an evolutionary capacitor to facilitate adaptation by releasing cryptic genetic variation in natural populations at times of stress. This variation would lie beyond stop codons, which show a high rate of in-frame loss in yeast. Mathematical models suggest that [PSI+] may have evolved for this function.

== Physical Characteristics ==
Sup 35 contains a carboxyl-terminal region (C-terminus), which is responsible for the translation-termination activity. The amino-terminal(N-terminus) region of the protein is responsible for alternately folding depending on the conformation. The middle (m) domain has an unknown function. In an effort to determine the function of these N and M regions, in Susan Lindquists' experiment two of the strains were engineered to produce a version of Sup35p which does not include the N and M regions.

The Sup35p protein is 685 amino acids long. The C-terminal contains 5 complete and one incomplete repeat of the Oligopeptide repeat sequence PQGGYQQ-YN. In modified versions of the gene, it has been shown that the more repeats of this sequence present, the more the protein is to assume the [Psi+] confirmation. In fact, the addition of two extra repeats (R2) result in the [Psi-] to [Psi+] conversion in being 5000 times faster. PMN2, a mutant, dominant version of the gene Sup35p, has a glycine to aspartic acid substitution in the second repeat. The resulting phenotype is a lack of ability to maintain the [Psi+] conformation.

The N-terminus has a high glutamine/asparagine amount at 43%, while the average yeast protein only contains 9%. The N terminus is 114 amino acids long and is termed the prion forming domain (PrD). Over expression of the Sup35p gene can lead to [Psi+].

Both the N and M terminals and the C terminus form binding sites to Sup45p, giving a total of two. Also, in binding to Sup45p the [psi+] protein can cause it to aggregate and form a prion.

== Adenine Pathway ==
The phenotypic differences between [psi-] and [psi+] is made clear when the ability of the cell to make adenine is tampered with. The buildup of P-ribosylamino imidazole (AIR) (a precursor in the adenine pathway in yeast) induces a red pigment in a yeast colony visible to the naked eye. In isogenic strains where the non-sense mutation is in the middle of either the gene ADE 2 or ADE 1 (enzymes involved in the pathway), the [psi-] strain has either build ups of P-ribosylamino imidazole (AIR), or P-ribosylamino imidazolecarboxylate (CAIR), respectively. Because CAIR converts back into AIR if the enzyme that catalyzes it to the next precursor is absent, either mutation will cause a red color in the [psi-] strain. The [psi+] strain appears white even when subjected to the same non-sense mutations. Thus, it is inferred that the eRF3 of the [psi+] is non-functional.

This phenomenon is because the eRF3 in [psi-] is able to disconnect the ribosome effectively, so the enzyme cannot be properly synthesized. However, in the [psi+] strain, the enzyme is able to be synthesized enough so that the pathway still successfully produces adenine.

== See also ==
- Translation (genetics)
- Fungal Prions
- Prion
- Release factor
- Sup45p
