= Lactosylceramide alpha-2,3-sialyltransferase =

Class of enzymes

lactosylceramide alpha-2,3-sialyltransferase

Identifiers
- EC no.: 2.4.99.9
- CAS no.: 125752-90-1

Databases
- BRENDA: enzyme data
- ExPASy: NiceZyme view
- KEGG: enzyme entry
- MetaCyc: metabolic pathway
- Rhea: reactions
- PDB structures: RCSB PDB PDBe PDBsum
- Gene Ontology: AmiGO / QuickGO
Search
- PMC: articles
- PubMed: articles
- NCBI: proteins

In enzymology, a lactosylceramide alpha-2,3-sialyltransferase (EC 2.4.99.9) is an enzyme that catalyzes the chemical reaction

CMP-N-acetylneuraminate + beta-D-galactosyl-1,4-beta-D-glucosylceramide $\rightleftharpoons$ CMP + alpha-N-acetylneuraminyl-2,3-beta-D-galactosyl-1,4-beta-D- glucosylceramide

Thus, the two substrates of this enzyme are CMP-N-acetylneuraminate and beta-D-galactosyl-1,4-beta-D-glucosylceramide, whereas its 3 products are CMP, alpha-N-acetylneuraminyl-2,3-beta-D-galactosyl-1,4-beta-D-, and glucosylceramide.

This enzyme belongs to the family of transferases, specifically those glycosyltransferases that do not transfer hexosyl or pentosyl groups. The systematic name of this enzyme class is CMP-N-acetylneuraminate:lactosylceramide alpha-2,3-N-acetylneuraminyltransferase. Other names in common use include cytidine monophosphoacetylneuraminate-lactosylceramide alpha2,3-, sialyltransferase, CMP-acetylneuraminate-lactosylceramide-sialyltransferase, CMP-acetylneuraminic acid:lactosylceramide sialyltransferase, CMP-sialic acid:lactosylceramide-sialyltransferase, cytidine monophosphoacetylneuraminate-lactosylceramide, sialyltransferase, ganglioside GM3 synthetase, GM3 synthase, GM3 synthetase, and SAT 1. This enzyme participates in glycosphingolipid biosynthesis - ganglioseries and glycan structures - biosynthesis 2.

== Structural studies ==
As of late 2007, two structures have been solved for this class of enzymes, with PDB accession codes PDB: 2EX0 and PDB: 2EX1.

== Function ==
Ganglioside GM3 is known to participate in the induction of cell differentiation, modulation of cell proliferation, maintenance of fibroblast morphology, signal transduction, and integrin-mediated cell adhesion. The enzyme is a type II membrane protein which catalyzes the formation of GM3 using lactosylceramide as the substrate. The encoded protein is a member of glycosyltransferase family 29 and may be localized to the Golgi apparatus. Mutation in this gene has been associated with Amish infantile epilepsy syndrome. Transcript variants encoding different isoforms have been found for this gene.

== Gene ==
ST3GAL5

Identifiers
- Aliases: ST3GAL5, SATI, SIAT9, SIATGM3S, ST3GalV, ST3 beta-galactoside alpha-2,3-sialyltransferase 5, SPDRS, ST3Gal V
- External IDs: OMIM: 604402; MGI: 1339963; GeneCards: ST3GAL5
Enzyme activity
EC #	BRENDA	ExPASy	KEGG	MetaCyc
2.4.3.9	↗	↗	↗	↗

Gene location (Human)
Chr.	Chromosome 2 (human)
Band	2p11.2	Start	85,837,120 bp
Band	2p11.2	End	85,905,199 bp

Gene location (Mouse)
Chr.	Chromosome 6 (mouse)
Band	6|6 C1	Start	72,074,576 bp
Band	6|6 C1	End	72,131,555 bp
RNA expression pattern
Bgee	Human / Mouse (ortholog); Top expressed in: right adrenal gland; right adrenal cortex; left adrenal gland; right lobe of thyroid gland; left lobe of thyroid gland; left adrenal cortex; C1 segment; lateral nuclear group of thalamus; decidua; middle temporal gyrus / Top expressed in: granulocyte; fetal liver hematopoietic progenitor cell; adrenal gland; soleus muscle; blood; tibiofemoral joint; choroid plexus of fourth ventricle; superior frontal gyrus; epithelium of lens; temporal muscle; More reference expression data
BioGPS	More reference expression data
Gene ontology
Molecular function	transferase activity; lactosylceramide alpha-2,3-sialyltransferase activity; glycosyltransferase activity; neolactotetraosylceramide alpha-2,3-sialyltransferase activity; sialyltransferase activity; beta-galactoside (CMP) alpha-2,3-sialyltransferase activity
Cellular component	integral component of membrane; Golgi apparatus; membrane; integral component of plasma membrane; Golgi membrane
Biological process	glycosphingolipid biosynthetic process; protein glycosylation; oligosaccharide metabolic process; sialylation; protein N-linked glycosylation via asparagine; ganglioside biosynthetic process; carbohydrate metabolic process
Sources:Amigo / QuickGO
Orthologs
Databases	NCBI: entry; OMA: entry
Species	Human	Mouse
Entrez	8869	20454
Ensembl	ENSG00000115525	ENSMUSG00000056091
UniProt	Q9UNP4	O88829
RefSeq (mRNA)	NM_001042437; NM_003896; NM_001354226; NM_001354227; NM_001354233 NM_001354234; NM_001354238; NM_001354247; NM_001354248; NM_001354223; NM_001354224; NM_001354229; NM_001363847	NM_001035228; NM_011375
RefSeq (protein)	NP_001035902; NP_003887; NP_001341155; NP_001341156; NP_001341162 NP_001341163; NP_001341167; NP_001341176; NP_001341177; NP_001341152; NP_001341153; NP_001341158; NP_001350776	NP_001030305; NP_035505
Location (UCSC)	Chr 2: 85.84 – 85.91 Mb	Chr 6: 72.07 – 72.13 Mb
PubMed search
- Wikidata
View/Edit Human	View/Edit Mouse

Lactosylceramide alpha-2,3-sialyltransferase is encoded in humans by the ST3GAL5 gene.

Mutations in this gene have also been associated to ‘Salt & Pepper’ syndrome: an autosomal recessive condition characterized by severe intellectual disability, epilepsy, scoliosis, choreoathetosis, dysmorphic facial features and altered dermal pigmentation. (doi: 10.1093/hmg/ddt434)
