= Lactosylceramide alpha-2,6-N-sialyltransferase =

Class of enzymes

lactosylceramide alpha-2,6-N-sialyltransferase

Identifiers
- EC no.: 2.4.99.11
- CAS no.: 55071-95-9

Databases
- IntEnz: IntEnz view
- BRENDA: BRENDA entry
- ExPASy: NiceZyme view
- KEGG: KEGG entry
- MetaCyc: metabolic pathway
- PRIAM: profile
- PDB structures: RCSB PDB PDBe PDBsum
- Gene Ontology: AmiGO / QuickGO
Search
- PMC: articles
- PubMed: articles
- NCBI: proteins

In enzymology, a lactosylceramide alpha-2,6-N-sialyltransferase (EC 2.4.99.11) is an enzyme that catalyzes the chemical reaction

CMP-N-acetylneuraminate + beta-D-galactosyl-1,4-beta-D-glucosylceramide $\rightleftharpoons$ CMP + alpha-N-acetylneuraminyl-2,6-beta-D-galactosyl-1,4-beta-D- glucosylceramide

Thus, the two substrates of this enzyme are CMP-N-acetylneuraminate and beta-D-galactosyl-1,4-beta-D-glucosylceramide, whereas its 3 products are CMP, alpha-N-acetylneuraminyl-2,6-beta-D-galactosyl-1,4-beta-D-, and glucosylceramide.

This enzyme belongs to the family of transferases, specifically those glycosyltransferases that do not transfer hexosyl or pentosyl groups. The systematic name of this enzyme class is CMP-N-acetylneuraminate:lactosylceramide alpha-2,6-N-acetylneuraminyltransferase. Other names in common use include cytidine monophosphoacetylneuraminate-lactosylceramide, sialyltransferase, CMP-acetylneuraminate-lactosylceramide-sialyltransferase, CMP-N-acetylneuraminic acid:lactosylceramide sialyltransferase, CMP-sialic acid:lactosylceramide sialyltransferase, cytidine monophosphoacetylneuraminate-lactosylceramide, and sialyltransferase.
