= Prion =

Pathogenic type of misfolded protein

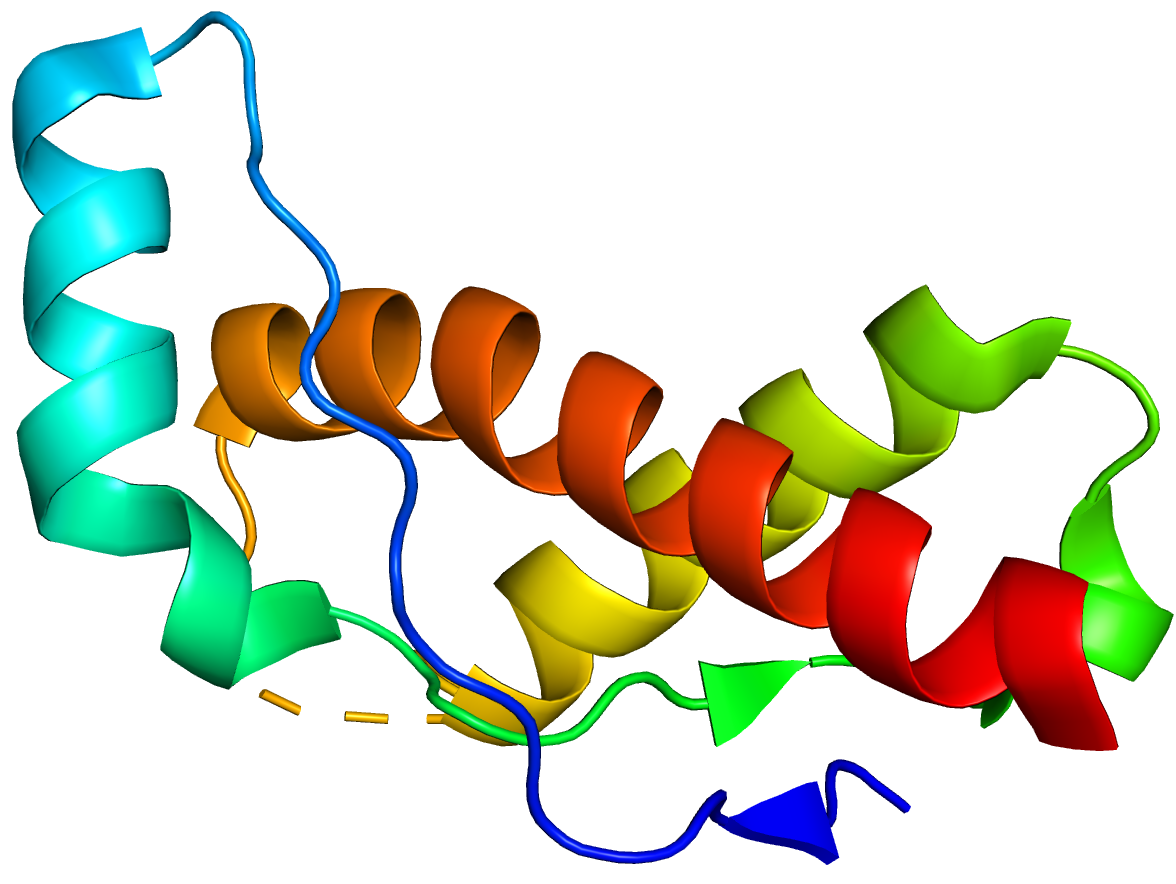
- 3D structure of major prion protein
- Pronunciation: /ˈpriː.ɒn/, /ˈpraɪ.ɒn/
- Specialty: Infectious diseases

A prion (/ˈpriː.ɒn/, /ˈpraɪ.ɒn/) is a misfolded protein that induces folding problems in normal variants of the same protein, leading to cellular death. Prions are responsible for prion diseases, which are fatal and transmissible neurodegenerative diseases affecting animals, including humans. These proteins can misfold sporadically, due to genetic mutations, or through exposure to an already misfolded protein, leading to an abnormal three-dimensional structure that can propagate misfolding in other proteins.

The term prion derives from "proteinaceous infectious particle". Unlike other infectious agents such as viruses, bacteria, and fungi, prions do not contain nucleic acids (DNA or RNA). Prions are primarily twisted isoforms of the major prion protein (PrP), a naturally occurring protein with an uncertain function. They are the hypothesized cause of various diseases, including scrapie in sheep, chronic wasting disease (CWD) in deer, bovine spongiform encephalopathy (BSE) in cattle (mad cow disease), and Creutzfeldt–Jakob disease (CJD) in humans.

All known prion diseases in mammals affect the structure of the brain or other neural tissues. These diseases are progressive, have no known effective treatment, and are invariably fatal. Most prion diseases were thought to be caused by PrP until 2015 when a prion form of alpha-synuclein was linked to multiple system atrophy (MSA). Misfolded proteins are also linked to other neurodegenerative diseases like Alzheimer's disease, Parkinson's disease, and amyotrophic lateral sclerosis (ALS), which have been shown to originate and progress by a prion-like mechanism.

Prions are a type of intrinsically disordered protein that continuously changes conformation unless bound to a specific partner, such as another protein. Once a prion binds to another in the same conformation, it stabilizes and can form a fibril, leading to abnormal protein aggregates called amyloids. These amyloids accumulate in infected tissue, causing damage and cell death. The structural stability of prions makes them resistant to denaturation by chemical or physical agents, complicating disposal and containment, and raising concerns about iatrogenic spread through medical instruments.

== Etymology and pronunciation ==
The word prion, coined in 1982 by Stanley B. Prusiner, is derived from protein and infection, hence prion. It is short for "proteinaceous infectious particle", in reference to its ability to self-propagate and transmit its conformation to other proteins. Its main pronunciation is /ˈpriːɒn/, although /ˈpraɪɒn/, as the homographic name of the bird (prions or whalebirds) is pronounced, is also heard. In his 1982 paper introducing the term, Prusiner specified that it is "pronounced pree-on". Coincidentally, the word has an appropriate parallel in Greek: πριόνι (prioni) means "a saw" (for cutting).

== Prion protein ==
=== Structure ===
Prions consist of a misfolded form of major prion protein (PrP), a protein that is a natural part of the bodies of humans and other animals. The PrP found in infectious prions has a different structure and is resistant to proteases, the enzymes in the body that can normally break down proteins. The normal form of the protein is called PrP^{C}, while the infectious form is called PrP^{Sc} – the C refers to 'cellular' PrP, while the Sc refers to 'scrapie', the prototypic prion disease, occurring in sheep. PrP can also be induced to fold into other more-or-less well-defined isoforms in vitro; although their relationships to the form(s) that are pathogenic in vivo is often unclear, high-resolution structural analyses have begun to reveal structural features that correlate with prion infectivity.

==== PrP^{C} ====
PrP^{C} is a normal protein found on the membranes of cells, "including several blood components of which platelets constitute the largest reservoir in humans". It has 209 amino acids (in humans), one disulfide bond, a molecular mass of 35–36 kDa and a mainly alpha-helical structure. Several topological forms exist; one cell surface form that is anchored via glycolipid, and two transmembrane forms. The normal protein is not sedimentable; meaning that it cannot be separated by centrifuging techniques. It has a complex function, which continues to be investigated. PrP^{C} binds copper(II) ions (those in a +2 oxidation state) with high affinity. This property is supposed to play a role in PrP^{C}'s anti-oxidative properties via reversible oxidation of the N-terminal's methionine residues into sulfoxide. Moreover, studies have suggested that, in vivo, due to PrP^{C}'s low selectivity to metallic substrates, the protein's anti oxidative function is impaired when in contact with metals other than copper. PrP^{C} is readily digested by proteinase K and can be liberated from the cell surface by the enzyme phosphoinositide phospholipase C (PI-PLC), which cleaves the glycophosphatidylinositol (GPI) glycolipid anchor. PrP plays an important role in cell-cell adhesion and intracellular signaling in vivo, and may therefore be involved in cell-cell communication in the brain.

==== PrP^{Sc} ====
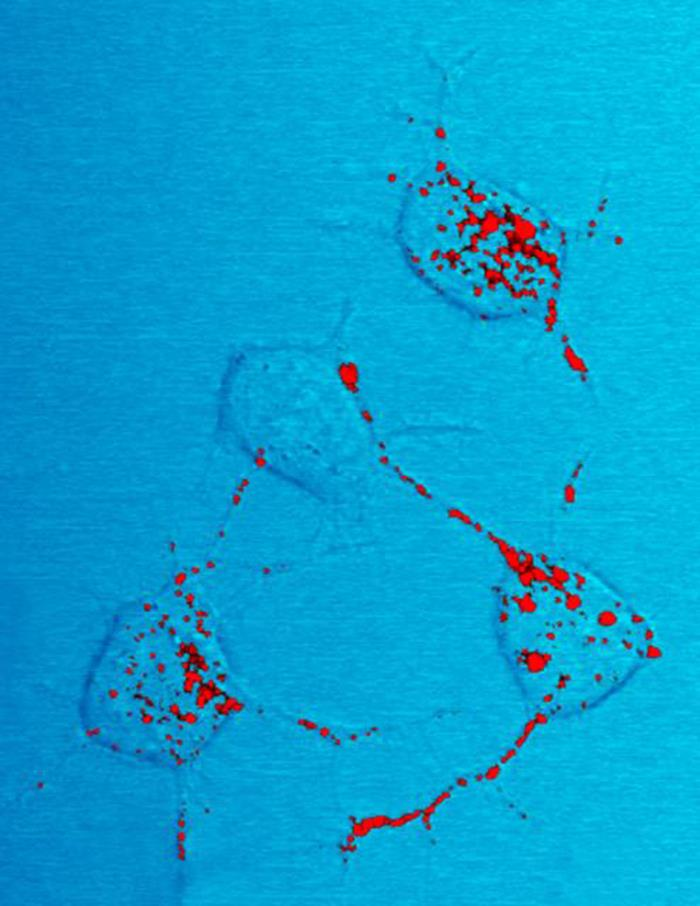
PrP^{Sc} (stained in red) revealed in a photomicrograph of scrapie-infected mouse neuronal cells.

The infectious isoform of PrP, known as PrP^{Sc}, or simply the prion, is able to convert normal PrP^{C} proteins into the infectious isoform by changing their conformation, or shape; this, in turn, alters the way the proteins interact. PrP^{Sc} always causes prion disease. PrP^{Sc} has a higher proportion of β-sheet structure in place of the normal α-helix structure. Several highly infectious, brain-derived PrP^{Sc} structures have been discovered by cryo-electron microscopy. Another brain-derived fibril structure isolated from humans with Gerstmann-Straussler-Schienker syndrome has also been determined. All of the structures described in high resolution so far are amyloid fibers in which individual PrP molecules are stacked via intermolecular beta sheets. However, 2-D crystalline arrays have also been reported at lower resolution in ex vivo preparations of prions. In the prion amyloids, the glycolipid anchors and asparagine-linked glycans, when present, project outward from the lateral surfaces of the fiber cores. Often PrP^{Sc} is bound to cellular membranes, presumably via its array of glycolipid anchors, however, sometimes the fibers are dissociated from membranes and accumulate outside of cells in the form of plaques. The end of each fiber acts as a template onto which free protein molecules may attach, allowing the fiber to grow. This growth process requires complete refolding of PrP^{C}. Different prion strains have distinct templates, or conformations, even when composed of PrP molecules of the same amino acid sequence, as occurs in a particular host genotype. Under most circumstances, only PrP molecules with an identical amino acid sequence to the infectious PrP^{Sc} are incorporated into the growing fiber. However, cross-species transmission also happens rarely.

==== PrP^{res} ====
Protease-resistant PrP^{Sc}-like protein (PrP^{res}) is the name given to any isoform of PrP^{C} that is structurally altered and converted into a misfolded proteinase K-resistant form. To model conversion of PrP^{C} to PrP^{Sc} in vitro, Kocisko et al. showed that PrP^{Sc} could cause PrP^{C} to convert to PrP^{res} under cell-free conditions. However, the authors state that their results do not rule out the involvement of other non-PrP constituents such as nucleic acids. Soto et al. demonstrated sustained amplification of PrP^{res} (sample sourced from scrapie-infected brain homogenate) and prion infectivity by a procedure involving cyclic amplification of protein misfolding. The term "PrP^{res}" may refer either to protease-resistant forms of PrP^{Sc}, which is isolated from infectious tissue and associated with the transmissible spongiform encephalopathy agent, or to other protease-resistant forms of PrP that, for example, might be generated in vitro. Accordingly, unlike PrP^{Sc}, PrP^{res} may not necessarily be infectious.

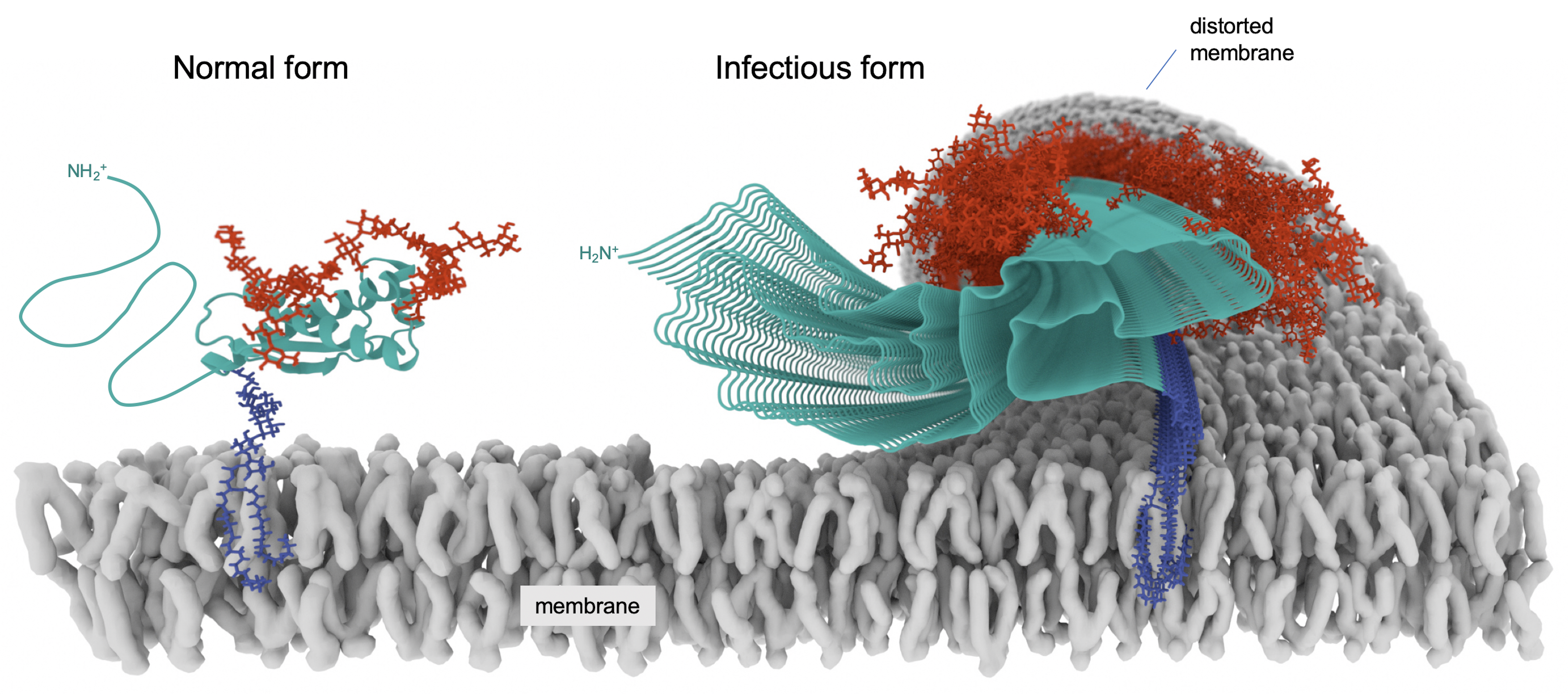
Models of normal (PrP^{C}) and infectious (PrP^{Sc}) forms of prion protein on a membrane: polypeptide (turquoise); glycans (red); glycolipid anchors (blue). The core structures are based on NMR spectroscopy (PrP^{C}) and cryo-electron microscopy (PrP^{Sc}).

=== Normal function of PrP ===
The physiological function of the prion protein remains poorly understood. While data from in vitro experiments suggest many dissimilar roles, studies on PrP knockout mice have provided only limited information because these animals exhibit only minor abnormalities. Research in mice has found that the cleavage of PrP in peripheral nerves causes the activation of myelin repair in Schwann cells, and that the lack of PrP proteins causes demyelination in those cells.

==== PrP and regulated cell death ====
MAVS, RIP1, and RIP3 are prion-like proteins found in other parts of the body. They also polymerise into filamentous amyloid fibers that initiate regulated cell death in the case of a viral infection to prevent the spread of virions to other, surrounding cells. There is evidence that PrP and pathogenic PrP^{Sc} contribute to ferroptosis sensitivity, a condition that is enhanced by RAC3 expression.

==== PrP and long-term memory ====
A review of evidence in 2005 suggested that PrP may have a normal function in the maintenance of long-term memory. As well, a 2004 study found that mice lacking genes for normal cellular PrP protein show altered hippocampal long-term potentiation. A recent study that also suggests why this might be the case, found that neuronal protein CPEB has a similar genetic sequence to yeast prion proteins. The prion-like formation of CPEB is essential for maintaining long-term synaptic changes associated with long-term memory formation.

==== PrP and stem cell renewal ====
A 2006 article from the Whitehead Institute for Biomedical Research indicates that PrP expression on stem cells is necessary for an organism's self-renewal of bone marrow. The study showed that all long-term hematopoietic stem cells express PrP on their cell membrane and that hematopoietic tissues with PrP-null stem cells exhibit increased sensitivity to cell depletion.

==== PrP and innate immunity ====
There is some evidence that PrP may play a role in innate immunity, as the expression of PRNP, the PrP gene, is upregulated in many viral infections and PrP has antiviral properties against many viruses, including HIV.

== Replication ==
Heterodimer model of prion propagation

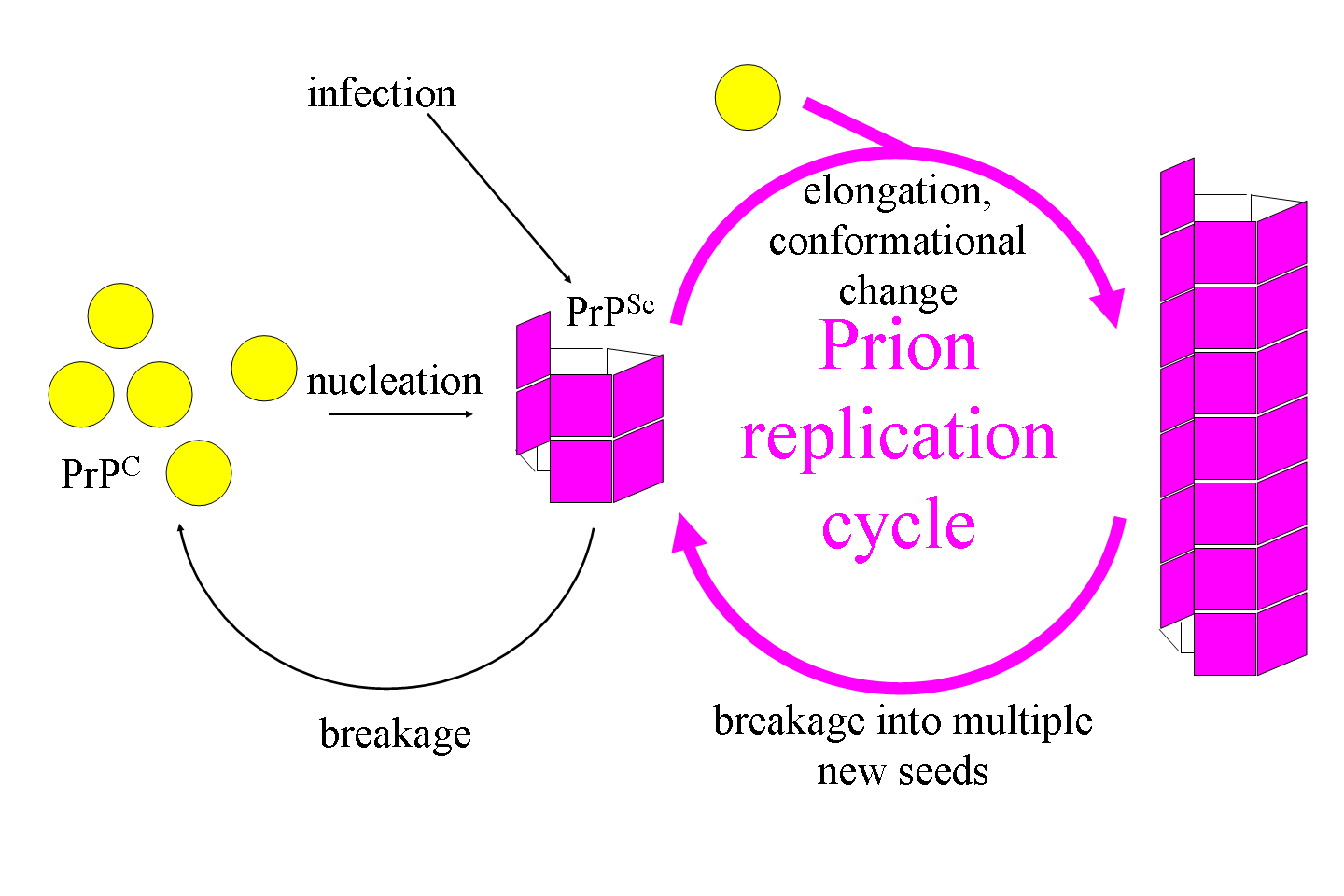
Fibril model of prion propagation

The first hypothesis that tried to explain how prions replicate in a protein-only manner was the heterodimer model. This model assumed that a single PrP^{Sc} molecule binds to a single PrP^{C} molecule and catalyzes its conversion into PrP^{Sc}. The two PrP^{Sc} molecules then come apart and can go on to convert more PrP^{C}. However, a model of prion replication must explain both how prions propagate, and why their spontaneous appearance is so rare. Manfred Eigen showed that the heterodimer model requires PrP^{Sc} to be an extraordinarily effective catalyst, increasing the rate of the conversion reaction by a factor of around 10^{15}. This problem does not arise if PrP^{Sc} exists only in aggregated forms such as amyloid, where cooperativity may act as a barrier to spontaneous conversion. What is more, despite considerable effort, infectious monomeric PrP^{Sc} has never been isolated.

An alternative model assumes that PrP^{Sc} exists only as fibrils, and that fibril ends bind PrP^{C} and convert it into PrP^{Sc}. If this were all, then the quantity of prions would increase linearly, forming ever longer fibrils. But exponential growth of both PrP^{Sc} and the quantity of infectious particles is observed during prion disease. This can be explained by taking into account fibril breakage. A mathematical solution for the exponential growth rate resulting from the combination of fibril growth and fibril breakage has been found. The exponential growth rate depends largely on the square root of the PrP^{C} concentration. The incubation period is determined by the exponential growth rate, and in vivo data on prion diseases in transgenic mice match this prediction. The same square root dependence is also seen in vitro in experiments with a variety of different amyloid proteins.

The mechanism of prion replication has implications for designing drugs. Since the incubation period of prion diseases is so long, an effective drug does not need to eliminate all prions, but simply needs to slow down the rate of exponential growth. Models predict that the most effective way to achieve this, using a drug with the lowest possible dose, is to find a drug that binds to fibril ends and blocks them from growing any further.

Researchers at Dartmouth College discovered that endogenous host cofactor molecules such as the phospholipid molecule (e.g. phosphatidylethanolamine) and polyanions (e.g. single stranded RNA molecules) are necessary to form PrP^{Sc} molecules with high levels of specific infectivity in vitro, whereas protein-only PrP^{Sc} molecules appear to lack significant levels of biological infectivity.

== Transmissible spongiform encephalopathies ==
Diseases caused by prions
Affected animal(s)	Disease
Sheep, goat	Scrapie
Cattle	Bovine spongiform encephalopathy
Camel	Camel spongiform encephalopathy
Mink	Transmissible mink encephalopathy
White-tailed deer, elk, mule deer, moose	Chronic wasting disease
Cat	Feline spongiform encephalopathy
Nyala, oryx, greater kudu	Exotic ungulate encephalopathy
Ostrich	Spongiform encephalopathy (unknown whether transmissible)
Human	Creutzfeldt–Jakob disease
Human	Iatrogenic Creutzfeldt–Jakob disease
Human	Variant Creutzfeldt–Jakob disease
Human	Sporadic Creutzfeldt–Jakob disease
Human	Gerstmann–Sträussler–Scheinker syndrome
Human	Fatal insomnia
Human	Kuru
Human	Familial spongiform encephalopathy
Human	Variably protease-sensitive prionopathy

Prions cause neurodegenerative disease by aggregating extracellularly within the central nervous system to form plaques known as amyloids, which disrupt the normal tissue structure. This disruption is characterized by "holes" in the tissue with resultant spongy architecture due to the vacuole formation in the neurons. Other histological changes include astrogliosis and the absence of an inflammatory reaction. While the incubation period for human prion diseases is relatively long (5 to 20 years or more), once symptoms appear the disease progresses rapidly, leading to brain damage and death. Neurodegenerative symptoms can include convulsions, dementia, ataxia (balance and coordination dysfunction), and behavioural or personality changes.

Many different mammalian species can be affected by prion diseases, as the prion protein (PrP) is very similar in all mammals. However, these changes make it unlikely for a prion disease which originated in one species to spread to another. The human prion disease variant Creutzfeldt–Jakob disease, however, is thought to be caused by a prion that typically infects cattle (causing bovine spongiform encephalopathy) and that is transmitted through infected meat.

All known prion diseases are untreatable and fatal.

Until 2015 all known mammalian prion diseases were considered to be caused by the prion protein, PrP. After 2015 this remains true for diseases in the category of "transmissible spongiform encephalopathy" (TSE), which is transmissible and causes a specific sponge-like appearance of infected brain tissue. The endogenous, properly folded form of the prion protein is denoted PrP^{C} (for Common or Cellular), whereas the disease-linked, misfolded form is denoted PrP^{Sc} (for Scrapie), after one of the diseases first linked to prions and neurodegeneration. The precise structure of the prion is not known, though they can be formed spontaneously by combining PrP^{C}, homopolymeric polyadenylic acid, and lipids in a protein misfolding cyclic amplification (PMCA) reaction even in the absence of pre-existing infectious prions. This result is further evidence that prion replication does not require genetic information.

=== Transmission ===
Prion diseases can arise in three different ways: acquired, familial, or sporadic. It is often assumed that the disease-related form (PrP^{Sc}) directly interacts with the normal form (PrP^{C}) to make it rearrange its structure. One idea, the "Protein X" hypothesis, is that an as-yet unidentified cellular protein (Protein X) enables the conversion of PrP^{C} to PrP^{Sc} by bringing a molecule of each of the two together into a complex.

The primary method of prion infection in animals is through ingestion of PrP^{Sc}. It is thought that prions may be deposited in the environment through the remains of dead animals and via urine, saliva, and other body fluids. They may then linger in the soil by binding to clay and other minerals.

A University of California research team has provided evidence that infection can occur from prions in feces. Since animal excrement is present in many areas surrounding water reservoirs, and manure is used to fertilize many crop fields, this raises the possibility of widespread transmission. Preliminary evidence suggesting that prions might be transmitted through the use of urine-derived human menopausal gonadotropin, administered for the treatment of infertility, was published in 2011.

==== Genetic susceptibility ====
The majority of human prion diseases are classified as sporadic (idiopathic) Creutzfeldt–Jakob disease (sCJD). Genetic research has identified an association between susceptibility to sCJD and a polymorphism at codon 129 in the PRNP gene, which encodes the prion protein (PrP). A homozygous methionine/methionine (MM) genotype at this position has been shown to significantly increase the risk of developing sCJD when compared to a heterozygous methionine/valine (MV) genotype. Analysis of multiple studies has shown that individuals with the MM genotype are approximately five times more likely to develop sCJD than those with the MV genotype.

==== Prions in plants ====
In 2015, researchers at The University of Texas Health Science Center at Houston found that plants can be a vector for prions. When researchers fed hamsters grass that grew on ground where a deer that died with chronic wasting disease was buried, the hamsters became ill with CWD. The findings suggest that prions can be taken up by plants that are eaten by herbivores, thus completing the cycle. It is thus possible that there is a progressively accumulating number of prions in the environment.

=== Sterilization ===
Infectious agents possessing nucleic acids are dependent upon DNA or RNA to direct their continued replication. Prions, however, derive their infectivity from their ability to transform normal PrP to PrP^{Sc}, the misshapen, disease-causing conformation. Inactivating prions via sterilization, therefore, requires the denaturation of the protein to a state in which the molecule is no longer able to induce the abnormal folding of normal PrP. In general, prions are resistant to proteases, heat, ionizing radiation, and formaldehyde treatments, although their infectivity can be reduced by such treatments. Effective prion decontamination relies upon protein hydrolysis or reduction or destruction of protein tertiary structure. Examples of such sterilization agents include sodium hypochlorite, sodium hydroxide, and strongly acidic detergents such as LpH.

The World Health Organization recommends any of the following three procedures for the sterilization of all heat-resistant surgical instruments to ensure that they are not contaminated with prions:

1. Immerse in 1N sodium hydroxide and place in a gravity-displacement autoclave at 121 °C for 30 minutes; clean; rinse in water; and then perform routine sterilization processes.
2. Immerse in 1N sodium hypochlorite (20,000 parts per million available chlorine) for 1 hour; transfer instruments to water; heat in a gravity-displacement autoclave at 121 °C for 1 hour; clean; and then perform routine sterilization processes.
3. Immerse in 1N sodium hydroxide or sodium hypochlorite (20,000 parts per million available chlorine) for 1 hour; remove and rinse in water, then transfer to an open pan and heat in a gravity-displacement (121 °C) or in a porous-load (134 °C) autoclave for 1 hour; clean; and then perform routine sterilization processes.

Heating at 134 °C (273 °F) for 18 minutes in a pressurized steam autoclave has been found to be somewhat effective in deactivating prions. Ozone sterilization has been studied as a potential method for prion denaturation and deactivation. Other approaches being developed include thiourea-urea treatment, guanidinium chloride treatment, and special heat-resistant subtilisin combined with heat and detergent. A number of decontamination reagents have been commercially manufactured with significant differences in efficacy among methods. A method sufficient for sterilizing prions on one material may fail on another.

Renaturation of a completely denatured prion to infectious status has not yet been achieved; however, partially denatured prions can be renatured to an infective status under certain artificial conditions.

=== Degradation resistance in nature ===
Overwhelming evidence shows that prions resist degradation and persist in the environment for years, and that proteases do not degrade them. Experimental evidence shows that unbound prions degrade over time, while soil-bound prions remain at stable or increasing levels, suggesting that prions likely accumulate in the environment. One 2015 study by US scientists found that repeated drying and wetting may render soil bound prions less infectious, although this was dependent on the soil type they were bound to.

=== Degradation by living beings ===
Recent studies suggest that scrapie prions can be degraded by diverse cellular mechanisms in the affected animal cell. In an infected cell, extracellular lysosomal PrP^{Sc} does not tend to accumulate and is rapidly cleared by the lysosome via the endosome. The intracellular portion is harder to clear and tends to build up. The ubiquitin proteasome system appears to be able to degrade aggregates if they are small enough. Autophagy plays a bigger role by accepting PrP^{Sc} from the ER lumen and degrading it. Altogether these mechanisms allow the cell to delay its death from being overwhelmed by misfolded proteins. Inhibition of autophagy accelerates prion accumulation whereas encouragement of autophagy promotes prion clearance. Some autophagy-promoting compounds have shown promise in animal models by delaying disease onset and death.

In addition, keratinase from B. licheniformis, alkaline serine protease from Streptomyces sp, subtilisin-like pernisine from Aeropyrum pernix, alkaline protease from Nocardiopsis sp, nattokinase from B. subtilis, engineered subtilisins from B. lentus and serine protease from three lichen species have been found to degrade PrP^{Sc}.

== Fungi ==
Proteins showing prion-type behavior are also found in some fungi, which has been useful in helping to understand mammalian prions. Fungal prions do not always cause disease in their hosts. In yeast, protein refolding to the prion configuration is assisted by chaperone proteins such as Hsp104. All known prions induce the formation of an amyloid fold, in which the protein polymerises into an aggregate consisting of tightly packed beta sheets. Amyloid aggregates are fibrils, growing at their ends, and they replicate when breakage causes two growing ends to become four growing ends. The incubation period of prion diseases is determined by the exponential growth rate associated with prion replication, which is a balance between the linear growth and the breakage of aggregates.

Fungal proteins that exhibit templated structural change were discovered in the yeast Saccharomyces cerevisiae by Reed Wickner in the early 1990s. For their mechanistic similarity to mammalian prions, they were termed yeast prions. Subsequent to this, a prion has also been found in the fungus Podospora anserina. These prions behave similarly to PrP, but, in general, are nontoxic to their hosts. Susan Lindquist's group at the Whitehead Institute has argued that some fungal prions are not associated with any disease state, but they may have a useful role; however, researchers at the NIH have also provided arguments suggesting that fungal prions could be considered a diseased state. There is evidence that fungal prions have evolved specific functions that are beneficial to the microorganism that enhance their ability to adapt to their diverse environments. Further, within yeasts, prions can act as vectors of epigenetic inheritance, transferring traits to offspring without any genomic change.

Research into fungal prions has given strong support to the protein-only concept, since purified protein extracted from cells with a prion state has been demonstrated to convert the normal form of the protein into a misfolded form in vitro, and in the process, preserve the information corresponding to different strains of the prion state. It has also shed some light on prion domains, which are regions in a protein that promote the conversion into a prion. Fungal prions have helped to suggest mechanisms of conversion that may apply to all prions, though fungal prions appear to be distinct from infectious mammalian prions in that they lack a cofactor required for propagation. The characteristic prion domains may vary among species – e.g., characteristic fungal prion domains are not found in mammalian prions.

Fungal prions
Protein	Natural host	Normal function	Prion state	Prion phenotype	Year identified
Ure2p	Saccharomyces cerevisiae	Nitrogen catabolite repressor	[URE3]	Growth on poor nitrogen sources	1994
Sup35p	S. cerevisiae	Translation termination factor	[PSI+]	Increased levels of nonsense suppression	1994
HET-S	Podospora anserina	Regulates heterokaryon incompatibility	[Het-s]	Heterokaryon formation between incompatible strains	
Rnq1p	S. cerevisiae	Protein template factor	[RNQ+], [PIN+]	Promotes aggregation of other prions	
Swi1	S. cerevisiae	Chromatin remodeling	[SWI+]	Poor growth on some carbon sources	2008
Cyc8	S. cerevisiae	Transcriptional repressor	[OCT+]	Transcriptional derepression of multiple genes	2009
Mot3	S. cerevisiae	Nuclear transcription factor	[MOT3+]	Transcriptional derepression of anaerobic genes	2009
Sfp1	S. cerevisiae	Putative transcription factor	[ISP+]	Antisuppression	2010

== Treatments ==
There are no effective treatments for prion diseases as of 2018. Clinical trials in humans have not met with success and have been hampered by the rarity of prion diseases.

Many possible treatments work in the test-tube but not in lab animals. One treatment that prolongs the incubation period in lab mice has failed in human patients diagnosed with definite or probable Variant Creutzfeldt–Jakob disease. Another treatment that works in mice was tried in 6 human patients, all of whom died, before it went out of stock. There was no significant increase in lifespan, but autopsy suggests that the drug was safe and reached "encouraging" concentrations in the brain and cerebrospinal fluid.

While there is no known way to extend the life of a patient with prion disease, some drugs can be prescribed to control specific symptoms of the disease and accommodations can be given to improve quality of life.

== In other diseases ==
Prion-like domains have been found in a variety of other mammalian proteins. Some of these proteins have been implicated in the ontogeny of age-related neurodegenerative disorders such as amyotrophic lateral sclerosis (ALS), frontotemporal lobar degeneration with ubiquitin-positive inclusions (FTLD-U), Alzheimer's disease, Parkinson's disease, and Huntington's disease. They are also implicated in some forms of systemic amyloidosis including AA amyloidosis that develops in humans and animals with inflammatory and infectious diseases such as tuberculosis, Crohn's disease, rheumatoid arthritis, and HIV/AIDS. AA amyloidosis, like prion disease, may be transmissible. The involvement of abnormal proteins in all of these diseases has given rise to the 'prion paradigm', where otherwise harmless proteins can be converted to a pathogenic form by a small number of misfolded, nucleating proteins.

The definition of a prion-like domain arises from the study of fungal prions. In yeast, prionogenic proteins have a portable prion domain that is both necessary and sufficient for self-templating and protein aggregation. This has been shown by attaching the prion domain to a reporter protein, which then aggregates like a known prion. Similarly, removing the prion domain from a fungal prion protein inhibits prion genesis. This modular view of prion behavior has led to the hypothesis that similar prion domains are present in animal proteins, in addition to PrP. These fungal prion domains have several characteristic sequence features. They are typically enriched in asparagine, glutamine, tyrosine and glycine residues, with an asparagine bias being particularly conducive to the aggregative property of prions. Historically, prion genesis has been seen as independent of sequence and only dependent on relative residue content. However, this has been shown to be false, with the spacing of prolines and charged residues having been shown to be critical in amyloid formation.

Bioinformatic screens have predicted that over 250 human proteins contain prion-like domains (PrLD). These domains are hypothesized to have the same transmissible, amyloidogenic properties of PrP and known fungal proteins. As in yeast, proteins involved in gene expression and RNA binding seem to be particularly enriched in PrLD's, compared to other classes of protein. In particular, 29 of the known 210 proteins with an RNA recognition motif also have a putative prion domain. Meanwhile, several of these RNA-binding proteins have been independently identified as pathogenic in cases of ALS, FTLD-U, Alzheimer's disease, and Huntington's disease.

=== Role in neurodegenerative disease ===
The pathogenicity of prions and proteins with prion-like domains is hypothesized to arise from their self-templating ability and the resulting exponential growth of amyloid fibrils. The presence of amyloid fibrils in patients with degenerative diseases has been well documented. These amyloid fibrils are seen as the result of pathogenic proteins that self-propagate and form highly stable, non-functional aggregates. While this does not necessarily imply a causal relationship between amyloid and degenerative diseases, the toxicity of certain amyloid forms and the overproduction of amyloid in familial cases of degenerative disorders supports the idea that amyloid formation is generally toxic.

==== TDP-43 ====
Specifically, aggregation of TDP-43, an RNA-binding protein, has been found in ALS/MND patients, and mutations in the genes coding for these proteins have been identified in familial cases of ALS/MND. These mutations promote the misfolding of the proteins into a prion-like conformation. The misfolded form of TDP-43 forms cytoplasmic inclusions in affected neurons, and is found depleted in the nucleus. In addition to ALS/MND and FTLD-U, TDP-43 pathology is a feature of many cases of Alzheimer's disease, Parkinson's disease and Huntington's disease. The misfolding of TDP-43 is largely directed by its prion-like domain. This domain is inherently prone to misfolding, while pathological mutations in TDP-43 have been found to increase this propensity to misfold, explaining the presence of these mutations in familial cases of ALS/MND. As in yeast, the prion-like domain of TDP-43 has been shown to be both necessary and sufficient for protein misfolding and aggregation.

==== RNPA2B1, RNPA1 ====
Similarly, pathogenic mutations have been identified in the prion-like domains of heterogeneous nuclear riboproteins hnRNPA2B1 and hnRNPA1 in familial cases of muscle, brain, bone and motor neuron degeneration. The wild-type form of all of these proteins show a tendency to self-assemble into amyloid fibrils, while the pathogenic mutations exacerbate this behaviour and lead to excess accumulation.

==== Aβ ====
Alzheimer's disease is a form of dementia that is characterized by the buildup of two abnormal proteins in the brain: Aβ protein in Aβ plaques and tau protein in neurofibrillary tangles. Cumulative evidence indicates that abnormalities of Aβ are the earliest pathologic sign of Alzheimer's. In experimental animals, scientists found that Aβ can be induced to aggregate to form Aβ plaques and cerebral amyloid angiopathy by a mechanism that is similar to that underlying prion diseases. Under highly unusual circumstances, Aβ deposition also can be stimulated in humans by the iatrogenic introduction of abeta 'seeds' (sometimes referred to as 'Aβ prions') into the body. Specifically, researchers analyzed people who had been treated with biological materials (such as growth hormone or dura mater patches) that had been collected from deceased human donors; they found that some of the recipients developed prion disease, but also that some of them had Aβ plaques and cerebral amyloid angiopathy in the brain. This finding suggests that some batches of the biologic agents were contaminated with Aβ seeds, probably because some of the donors had Alzheimer's disease at the time of death. When a very long time had passed following exposure to the contaminated biologic material (30 years or more), some of the affected individuals showed other signs of Alzheimer's disease, including tauopathy. Researchers emphasize that Alzheimer's is not a contagious disease; rather, the findings in humans support the theory that abnormal Aβ initiates Alzheimer's disease by a 'prion-like' mechanism that originates within the body.

==== Alpha-synuclein ====
Both multiple system atrophy (MSA) and Parkinson's disease (PD) are associated with misfolded alpha-synuclein. In 2015, it was found that mice engineered to have a susceptible human version of alpha-synuclein become sick with MSA when injected in the brain with the brain homogenate of human MSA patients, but they do not get PD when injected with the brain homogenate of human PD patients. This suggests that the two diseases are different, with MSA being more transmissible. Misfolded alpha-synuclein from either Parkinson's disease or MSA can be detected by protein misfolding cyclic amplification (PMCA). The two forms, after PMCA, show different levels of fluorescence when bound to thioflavin T. This allows for distinguishing between the two diseases.

== History ==
In the 18th and 19th centuries, exportation of sheep from Spain was observed to coincide with a disease called scrapie. This disease caused the affected animals to "lie down, bite at their feet and legs, rub their backs against posts, fail to thrive, stop feeding and finally become lame". The disease was also observed to have the long incubation period that is a key characteristic of transmissible spongiform encephalopathies (TSEs). Although the cause of scrapie was not known back then, it is probably the first transmissible spongiform encephalopathy to be recorded.

In the 1950s, Carleton Gajdusek began research which eventually showed that kuru could be transmitted to chimpanzees by what was possibly a new infectious agent, work for which he eventually won the 1976 Nobel Prize. During the 1960s, two London-based researchers, radiation biologist Tikvah Alper and biophysicist John Stanley Griffith, developed the hypothesis that the transmissible spongiform encephalopathies are caused by an infectious agent consisting solely of proteins. Earlier investigations by E.J. Field into scrapie and kuru had found evidence for the transfer of pathologically inert polysaccharides that only become infectious post-transfer, in the new host. Alper and Griffith wanted to account for the discovery that the mysterious infectious agent causing the diseases scrapie and Creutzfeldt–Jakob disease resisted ionizing radiation. Griffith proposed three ways in which a protein could be a pathogen:

- In the first hypothesis, he suggested that if the protein is the product of a normally suppressed gene, and introducing the protein could induce the gene's expression, that is, wake the dormant gene up, then the result would be a process indistinguishable from replication, as the gene's expression would produce the protein, which would then wake the gene in other cells.
- His second hypothesis forms the basis of the modern prion theory, and proposed that an abnormal form of a cellular protein can convert normal proteins of the same type into its abnormal form, thus leading to replication.
- His third hypothesis proposed that the agent could be an antibody if the antibody was its own target antigen, as such an antibody would result in more and more antibody being produced against itself. However, Griffith acknowledged that this third hypothesis was unlikely to be true due to the lack of a detectable immune response.

Francis Crick recognized the potential significance of the Griffith protein-only hypothesis for scrapie propagation in the second edition of his "central dogma of molecular biology" (1970): While asserting that the flow of sequence information from protein to protein, or from protein to RNA and DNA was "precluded", he noted that Griffith's hypothesis was a potential contradiction (although it was not so promoted by Griffith). The central dogma was later revised, in part, to accommodate reverse transcription (which both Howard Temin and David Baltimore discovered in 1970).

In 1982, Stanley B. Prusiner of the University of California, San Francisco, announced that his team had purified the hypothetical infectious protein, which did not appear to be present in healthy hosts, though they did not manage to isolate the protein until two years after Prusiner's announcement. The protein was named a prion, for "proteinacious infectious particle", derived from the words protein and infection. When the prion was discovered, Griffith's first hypothesis, that the protein was the product of a normally silent gene, was favored by many. The gene was finally discovered, encoding the same protein that exists in normal hosts but in different form.

Following the discovery of the same protein in different form in uninfected individuals, the specific protein that the prion was composed of was named the prion protein (PrP), and Griffith's second hypothesis, that an abnormal form of a host protein can convert other proteins of the same type into its abnormal form, became the dominant theory. Prusiner was awarded the Nobel Prize in Physiology or Medicine in 1997 for his research into prions.

== See also ==
- Beta amyloid
- Bovine spongiform encephalopathy (BSE)
- Diseases of abnormal polymerization
- Kuru (disease)
- Mad cow crisis
- Non-cellular life
- Prion pseudoknot
- Proteinopathy
- Subviral agents
- Tau protein
