= Flavones =

Class of flavonoid chemical compounds

Molecular structure of the flavone backbone with numbers

Flavones (from Latin flavus "yellow") are a class of flavonoids based on the backbone of 2-phenylchromen-4-one (2-phenyl-1-benzopyran-4-one) (as shown in the first image of this article).

Flavones are common in foods, mainly from spices, and some yellow or orange fruits and vegetables. Common flavones include apigenin (4',5,7-trihydroxyflavone), luteolin (3',4',5,7-tetrahydroxyflavone), tangeritin (4',5,6,7,8-pentamethoxyflavone), chrysin (5,7-dihydroxyflavone), and 6-hydroxyflavone.

== Intake and elimination ==
The estimated daily intake of flavones is about 2 mg per day. Following ingestion and metabolism, flavones, other polyphenols, and their metabolites are absorbed poorly in body organs and are rapidly excreted in the urine, indicating mechanisms influencing their presumed absence of metabolic roles in the body.

== Drug interactions ==
Flavones have effects on CYP (P450) activity, which are enzymes that metabolize most drugs in the body.

== Biosynthesis ==
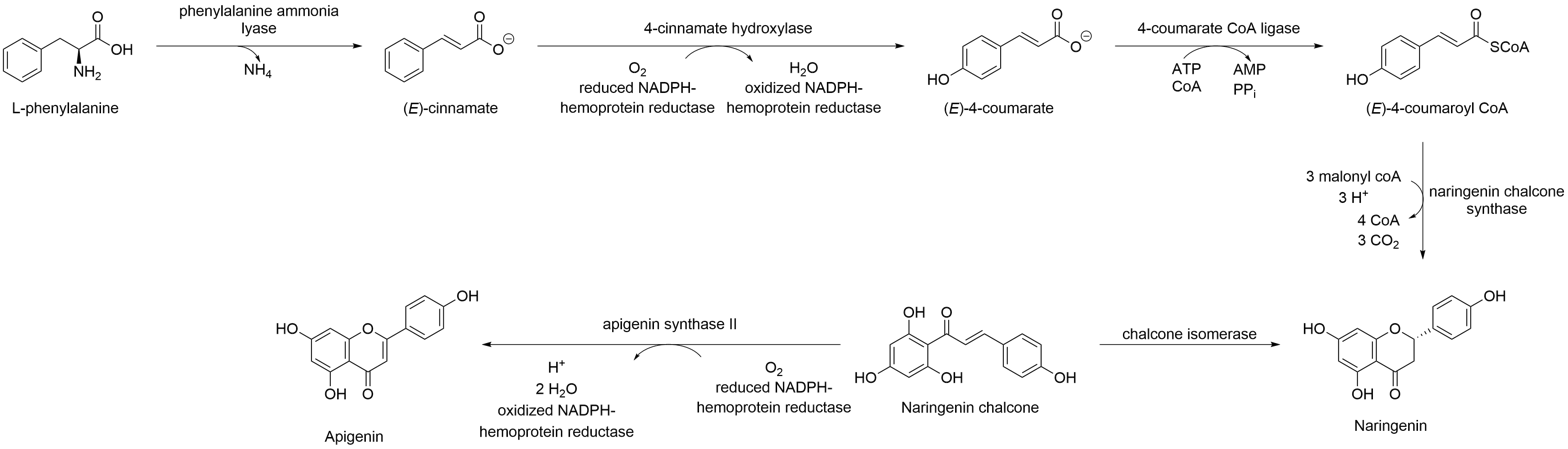
Synthesis of apigenin to depict general flavone biosynthesis.

The biosynthesis of flavones proceeds from the phenylpropanoid pathway, which uses L-phenylalanine as a starting point. Phenylalanine ammonia lyase facilitates the deamination of L-phenylalanine to (E)-cinnamate, which is then oxidized by cinnamate 4-hydroxylase to yield p-Coumaric acid. Coenzyme A is attached to the carboxylate facilitated by 4-Coumarate-CoA ligase, forming (Coumaroyl-CoA). A chalcone synthase then facilitates a series of condensation reactions in the presence of 3 malonyl CoA ending with a ring-forming Claisen condensation yielding a chalcone (naringenin chalcone is shown), which is subsequently isomerized by chalcone isomerase resulting in a flavanone (naringenin is shown). It is at this point that the flavanone can undergo further modifications (such as glycosylation or methylation at the various points of the backbone. The subsequent modified flavanones are then transformed into flavones by flavone synthase, which generates a double bond between the C-2 and C-3 positions (the synthesis of apigenin is shown).

== Organic chemistry ==
In organic chemistry several methods exist for the synthesis of flavones:

- Allan–Robinson reaction
- Auwers synthesis
- Baker–Venkataraman rearrangement
- Algar–Flynn–Oyamada reaction

Another method is the dehydrative cyclization of certain 1,3-diaryl diketones.

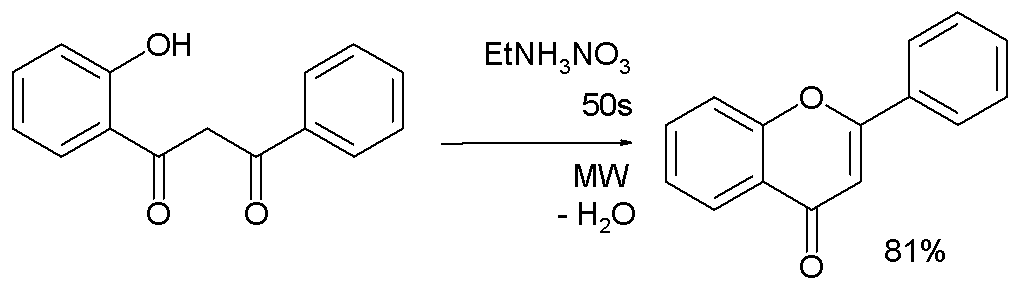

=== Wessely–Moser rearrangement ===
The Wessely–Moser rearrangement (1930) has been an important tool in structure elucidation of flavonoids. It involves the conversion of 5,7,8-trimethoxyflavone into 5,6,7-trihydroxyflavone on hydrolysis of the methoxy groups to phenol groups. It also has synthetic potential for example:

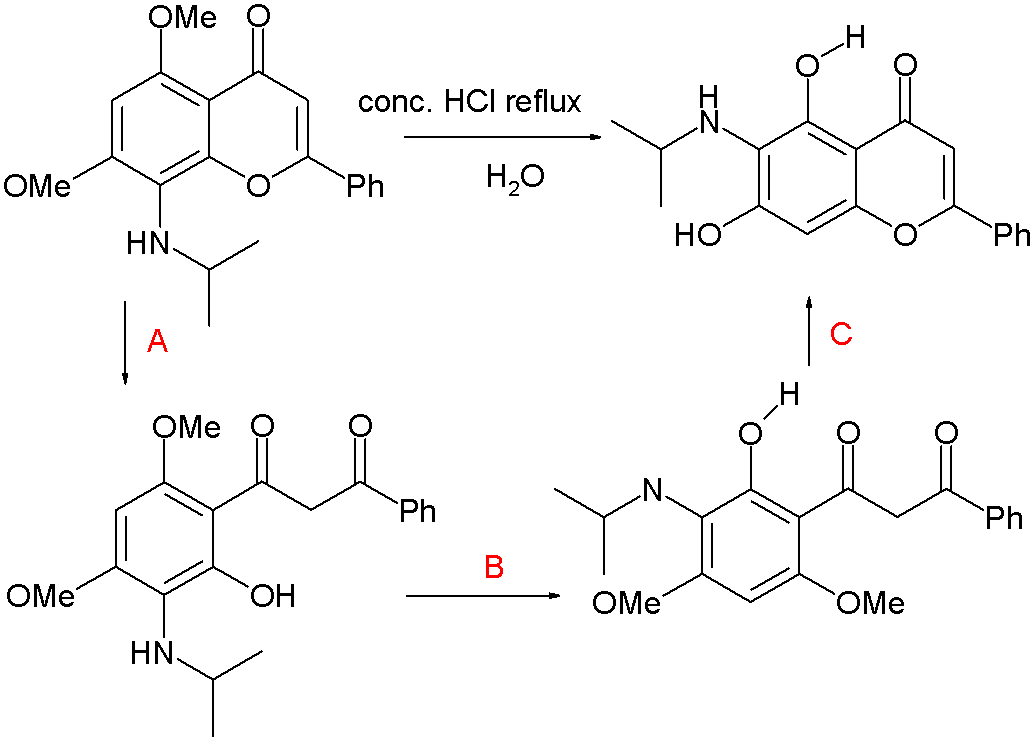

This rearrangement reaction takes place in several steps: A ring opening to the diketone, B bond rotation with formation of a favorable acetylacetone-like phenyl-ketone interaction and C hydrolysis of two methoxy groups and ring closure.

== Common flavones ==
Flavones and their structure
Name	Structure	R^{3}	R^{5}	R^{6}	R^{7}	R^{8}	R^{2'}	R^{3'}	R^{4'}	R^{5'}	R^{6'}
Flavone backbone		–	–	–	–	–	–	–	–	–	–
Primuletin		–	–OH	–	–	–	–	–	–	–	–
Chrysin		–	–OH	–	–OH	–	–	–	–	–	–
Tectochrysin		–	–OH	–	–OCH_{3}	–	–	–	–	–	–
Primetin		–	–OH	–	–	–OH	–	–	–	–	–
Apigenin		–	–OH	–	–OH	–	–	–	–OH	–	–
Acacetin		–	–OH	–	–OH	–	–	–	–OCH_{3}	–	–
Genkwanin		–	–OH	–	–OCH_{3}	–	–	–	–OH	–	–
Echioidinin		–	–OH	–	–OCH_{3}	–	–OH	–	–	–	–
Baicalein		–	–OH	–OH	–OH	–	–	–	–	–	–
Oroxylin A		–	–OH	–OCH_{3}	–OH	–	–	–	–	–	–
Negletein		–	–OH	–OH	–OCH_{3}	–	–	–	–	–	–
Norwogonin		–	–OH	–	–OH	–OH	–	–	–	–	–
Wogonin		–	–OH	–	–OH	–OCH_{3}	–	–	–	–	–
Liquiritigenin		–	–	–	–OH	–	–	–	–OH	–	–
Naringenin		–	–OH	–	–OH	–	–	–	–OH	–	–
Geraldone		–	–	–	–OH	–	–	–OCH_{3}	–OH	–	–
Tithonine		–	–	–	–OCH_{3}	–	–	–OH	–OCH_{3}	–	–
Luteolin		–	–OH	–	–OH	–	–	–OH	–OH	–	–
6-Hydroxyluteolin		–	–OH	–OH	–OH	–	–	–OH	–OH	–	–
Chrysoeriol		–	–OH	–	–OH	–	–	–OCH_{3}	–OH	–	–
Diosmetin		–	–OH	–	–OH	–	–	–OH	–OCH_{3}	–	–
Pilloin		–	–OH	–	–OCH_{3}	–	–	–OH	–OCH_{3}	–	–
Velutin		–	–OH	–	–OCH_{3}	–	–	–OCH_{3}	–OH	–	–
Norartocarpetin		–	–OH	–	–OH	–	–OH	–	–OH	–	–
Artocarpetin		–	–OH	–	–OCH_{3}	–	–OH	–	–OH	–	–
Scutellarein		–	–OH	–OH	–OH	–	–	–	–OH	–	–
Hispidulin		–	–OH	–OCH_{3}	–OH	–	–	–	–OH	–	–
Sorbifolin		–	–OH	–OH	–OCH_{3}	–	–	–	–OH	–	–
Pectolinarigenin		–	–OH	–OCH_{3}	–OH	–	–	–	–OCH_{3}	–	–
Cirsimaritin		–	–OH	–OCH_{3}	–OCH_{3}	–	–	–	–OH	–	–
Mikanin		–	–OH	–OCH_{3}	–OCH_{3}	–	–	–	–OCH_{3}	–	–
Isoscutellarein		–	–OH	–	–OH	–OH	–	–	–OH	–	–
Zapotinin		–	–OH	–OCH_{3}	–	–	–OCH_{3}	–	–	–	–OCH_{3}
Zapotin		–	–OCH_{3}	–OCH_{3}	–	–	–OCH_{3}	–	–	–	–OCH_{3}
Cerrosillin		–	–OCH_{3}	–OCH_{3}	–	–	–	–OCH_{3}	–	–OCH_{3}	–
Alnetin		–	–OH	–OCH_{3}	–OCH_{3}	–OCH_{3}	–	–	–	–	–
Tricetin		–	–OH	–	–OH	–	–	–OH	–OH	–OH	–
Tricin		–	–OH	–	–OH	–	–	–OCH_{3}	–OH	–OCH_{3}	–
Corymbosin		–	–OH	–	–OCH_{3}	–	–	–OCH_{3}	–OCH_{3}	–OCH_{3}	–
Nepetin		–	–OH	–OCH_{3}	–OH	–	–	–OH	–OH	–	–
Pedalitin		–	–OH	–OH	–OCH_{3}	–	–	–OH	–OH	–	–
Nodifloretin		–	–OH	–OH	–OH	–	–	–OCH_{3}	–OH	–	–
Jaceosidin		–	–OH	–OCH_{3}	–OH	–	–	–OCH_{3}	–OH	–	–
Cirsiliol		–	–OH	–OCH_{3}	–OCH_{3}	–	–	–OH	–OH	–	–
Eupatilin		–	–OH	–OCH_{3}	–OH	–	–	–OCH_{3}	–OCH_{3}	–	–
Cirsilineol		–	–OH	–OCH_{3}	–OCH_{3}	–	–	–OCH_{3}	–OH	–	–
Eupatorin		–	–OH	–OCH_{3}	–OCH_{3}	–	–	–	–OCH_{3}	–OH	–
Sinensetin		–	–OCH_{3}	–OCH_{3}	–OCH_{3}	–	–	–	–OCH_{3}	–OCH_{3}	–
Hypolaetin		–	–OH	–	–OH	–OH	–	–OH	–OH	–	–
Onopordin		–	–OH	–	–OH	–OCH_{3}	–	–OH	–OH	–	–
Wightin		–	–OH	–	–OCH_{3}	–OCH_{3}	–OCH_{3}	–OH	–	–	–
Nevadensin		–	–OH	–OCH_{3}	–OH	–OCH_{3}	–	–	–OCH_{3}	–	–
Xanthomicrol		–	–OH	–OCH_{3}	–OCH_{3}	–OCH_{3}	–	–	–OH	–	–
Tangeretin		–	–OCH_{3}	–OCH_{3}	–OCH_{3}	–OCH_{3}	–	–	–OCH_{3}	–	–
Serpyllin		–	–OH	–	–OCH_{3}	–OCH_{3}	–OCH_{3}	–OCH_{3}	–OCH_{3}	–	–
Sudachitin		–	–OH	–OCH_{3}	–OH	–OCH_{3}	–	–OCH_{3}	–OH	–	–
Acerosin		–	–OH	–OCH_{3}	–OH	–OCH_{3}	–	–OH	–OCH_{3}	–	–
Hymenoxin		–	–OH	–OCH_{3}	–OH	–OCH_{3}	–	–OCH_{3}	–OCH_{3}	–	–
Gardenin D		–	–OH	–OCH_{3}	–OCH_{3}	–OCH_{3}	–	–OH	–OCH_{3}	–	–
Nobiletin	–	–	–OCH_{3}	–OCH_{3}	–OCH_{3}	–OCH_{3}	–	–OCH_{3}	–OCH_{3}	–	–
Scaposin	–	–	–OH	–OCH_{3}	–OH	–OCH_{3}	–	–OCH_{3}	–OCH_{3}	–OH	
Name	Structure	R^{3}	R^{5}	R^{6}	R^{7}	R^{8}	R^{2'}	R^{3'}	R^{4'}	R^{5'}	R^{6'}

== Research ==
In one preliminary 2021 study, flavone intake was associated with lower odds of subjective cognitive decline after adjustment for age, total energy intake, major nondietary factors, and specific dietary factors.
