= Anthocyanidin =

Class of natural compounds

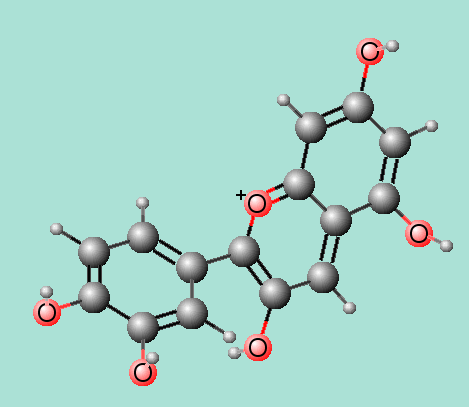
Molecule in 3D of the anthocyanidin cyanidin

Anthocyanidins are common plant pigments, the aglycones of anthocyanins. They are based on the flavylium cation, an oxonium ion, with various groups substituted for its hydrogen atoms. They generally change color from red through purple, blue, and bluish green as a function of pH.

Anthocyanidins are an important subclass of the polymethine dyes and flavonoids. The flavylium cation is a chromenylium cation with a phenyl group substituted in position 2; and chromenylium (also called benzopyrylium) is a bicyclic version of pyrylium. The positive charge can move around the molecule.

At least 31 monomeric anthocyanidins have been properly identified in living organisms, mostly as the core components of anthocyanins. The latter are responsible for the red, purple, blue, or black color of many fruits (like grapes and blueberries), flowers (like roses), leaves (like purple cabbage), and even tubers (like radishes and purple yams). They are also found in some animals.

== Classification ==
3-Deoxyanthocyanidins such as luteolinidin are a class of anthocyanidins lacking an hydroxyl group on carbon 3.

Selected anthocyanidins and their substitutions
Anthocyanidin	Basic structure (R^{3} & R^{4′} = −OH)	R^{3′}	R^{5′}	R^{5}	R^{6}	R^{7}
Aurantinidin	Basic structure of Anthocyans: The flavio-cation	−H	−H	−OH	−OH	−OH
Capensinidin	Basic structure of Anthocyans: The flavio-cation	−OCH_{3}	−OCH_{3}	−OCH_{3}	−H	−OH
Cyanidin	Basic structure of Anthocyans: The flavio-cation	−OH	−H	−OH	−H	−OH
Delphinidin	Basic structure of Anthocyans: The flavio-cation	−OH	−OH	−OH	−H	−OH
Europinidin	Basic structure of Anthocyans: The flavio-cation	−OCH_{3}	−OH	−OCH_{3}	−H	−OH
Hirsutidin	Basic structure of Anthocyans: The flavio-cation	−OCH_{3}	−OCH_{3}	−OH	−H	−OCH_{3}
Malvidin	Basic structure of Anthocyans: The flavio-cation	−OCH_{3}	−OCH_{3}	−OH	−H	−OH
Pelargonidin	Basic structure of Anthocyans: The flavio-cation	−H	−H	−OH	−H	−OH
Peonidin	Basic structure of Anthocyans: The flavio-cation	−OCH_{3}	−H	−OH	−H	−OH
Petunidin	Basic structure of Anthocyans: The flavio-cation	−OH	−OCH_{3}	−OH	−H	−OH
Pulchellidin	Basic structure of Anthocyans: The flavio-cation	−OH	−OH	−OCH_{3}	−H	−OH
Rosinidin	Basic structure of Anthocyans: The flavio-cation	−OCH_{3}	−H	−OH	−H	−OCH_{3}

== Natural occurrence ==
Most plant anthocyanins are based on cyanidin (30%), delphinidin (22%), and pelargonidin (18%), respectively. Altogether 20% of the anthocyanins are based on the three common anthocyanidins (peonidin, malvidin, and petunidin) that are methylated.

Around 3%, 3%, and 2% of the anthocyanins or anthocyanidins are respectively labeled as 3-desoxyanthocyanidins, rare methylated anthocyanidins, and 6-hydroxyanthocyanidins, respectively.

In bryophytes, anthocyanins are usually based on 3-desoxyanthocyanidins located in the cell wall. A new anthocyanidin, riccionidin A, has been isolated from the liverwort Ricciocarpos natans. It could be derived from 6,7,2′,4′,6′-pentahydroxyflavylium, having undergone ring closure of the 6’ -hydroxyl at the 3-position. Its visible spectrum in methanolic HCl is at 494 nm. This pigment was accompanied by riccionidin B, which most probably is based on two molecules of riccionidin A linked via the 3′- or 5′-positions. Both pigments were also detected in the liverworts Marchantia polymorpha, Riccia duplex, and Scapania undulata.

== Effect of pH ==
The stability of anthocyanidins is dependent on pH. At a low pH (acidic conditions), colored anthocyanidins are present, whereas at a higher pH (basic conditions) the colorless chalcones forms are present.

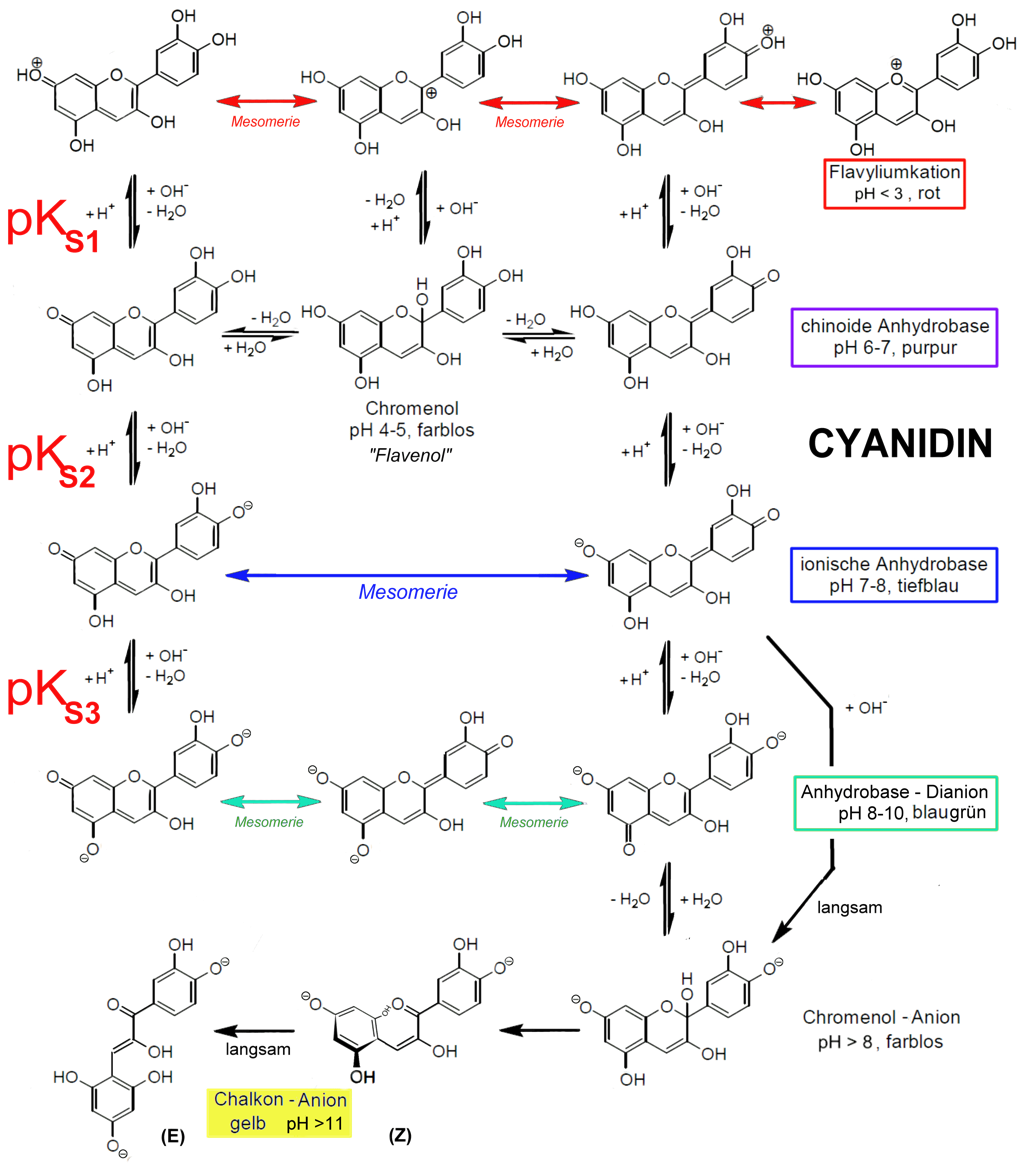
Stability of anthocyanidins is dependent on pH.
