= C18H16O7 =

The molecular formula C_{18}H_{16}O_{7} (molar mass: 344.31 g/mol, exact mass: 344.0896 u) may refer to:

- Ayanin, a flavonol
- Cirsilineol, a flavone
- Eupatilin, a flavone and a drug
- Pachypodol, a flavonol
- Santin (molecule), a flavonol
- Scillavone A, a homoisoflavone
- Usnic acid, a naturally occurring dibenzofuran derivative found in several lichen species
