= C16H12O8 =

The molecular formula C_{16}H_{12}O_{8} (molar mass: 332.26 g/mol, exact mass: 332.053217 u) may refer to:

- Annulatin, a flavanol
- Europetin, a flavonol
- Laricitrin, a flavonol
- Mearnsetin, a flavonol
- 5-O-Methylmyricetin, a flavonol
- Patuletin, a flavonol
