= C18H17O7 =

The molecular formula C_{18}H_{17}O_{7} (or C_{18}H_{17}O_{7}+, molar mass : 345.32 g/mol, exact mass : 345.097428) may refer to:

- Capensinidin, an anthocyanidin
- Hirsutidin, an anthocyanidin
