= Delphinidin 3',5'-O-glucosyltransferase =

Class of enzymes

Identifiers
- EC no.: 2.4.1.249

Databases
- IntEnz: IntEnz view
- BRENDA: BRENDA entry
- ExPASy: NiceZyme view
- KEGG: KEGG entry
- MetaCyc: metabolic pathway
- PRIAM: profile
- PDB structures: RCSB PDB PDBe PDBsum
Search
- PMC: articles
- PubMed: articles
- NCBI: proteins

Delphinidin 3',5'-O-glucosyltransferase (EC 2.4.1.249, UDP-glucose:anthocyanin 3',5'-O-glucosyltransferase, UA3'5'GZ) is an enzyme with systematic name UDP-glucose:delphinidin 3-O-(6-O-malonyl)-beta-D-glucoside 3'-O-glucosyltransferase. This enzyme catalyses the following chemical reaction

2 UDP-glucose + delphinidin 3-O-(6-O-malonyl)-beta-D-glucoside $\rightleftharpoons$ 2 UDP + delphinidin 3-O-(6-O-malonyl)-beta-D-glucoside-3',5'-di-O-beta-D-glucoside (overall reaction)
(1a) UDP-glucose + delphinidin 3-O-(6-O-malonyl)-beta-D-glucoside $\rightleftharpoons$ UDP + delphinidin 3-O-(6-O-malonyl)-beta-D-glucoside-3'-O-beta-D-glucoside
(1b) UDP-glucose + delphinidin 3-O-(6-O-malonyl)-beta-D-glucoside-3'-O-beta-D-glucoside $\rightleftharpoons$ UDP + delphinidin 3-O-(6-O-malonyl)-beta-D-glucoside-3',5'-di-O-beta-D-glucoside

This enzyme catalyses two reactions in the biosynthesis of ternatin C5.
