= A. asiatica =

A. asiatica may refer to:

- Agriades asiatica, the azure mountain blue, a small butterfly species found in the Himalayas
- Amelanchier asiatica, the Asian serviceberry, a shrub species
- Anumeta asiatica, a moth species found in the Middle East
- Artemisia asiatica (disambiguation), two plant species

== See also ==
- List of Latin and Greek words commonly used in systematic names § Asiatica
