= Petunidin =

Names
- IUPAC name 3,3′,4′,5,7-Pentahydroxy-5′-methoxyflavylium
- Systematic IUPAC name 2-(3,4-Dihydroxy-5-methoxyphenyl)-3,5,7-trihydroxy-1λ^{4}-benzopyran-1-ylium
- Other names Petunidine; Petunidin chloride; Petunidol; Myrtillidin

Identifiers
CAS Number	1429-30-7
3D model (JSmol)	Interactive image
ChEBI	CHEBI:75318
ChemSpider	390371
ECHA InfoCard	100.014.409
KEGG	C08727
PubChem CID	441774
UNII	WRK4Q8K2D8
CompTox Dashboard (EPA)	DTXSID90931677
- InChI: InChI=1S/C16H12O7/c1-22-14-3-7(2-11(19)15(14)21)16-12(20)6-9-10(18)4-8(17)5-13(9)23-16/h2-6H,1H3,(H4-,17,18,19,20,21)/p+1 Key: AFOLOMGWVXKIQL-UHFFFAOYSA-O; InChI=1/C16H12O7/c1-22-14-3-7(2-11(19)15(14)21)16-12(20)6-9-10(18)4-8(17)5-13(9)23-16/h2-6H,1H3,(H4-,17,18,19,20,21)/p+1 Key: AFOLOMGWVXKIQL-IKLDFBCSAS
- SMILES: Oc1cc2c(O)cc(O)cc2[o+]c1c3cc(O)c(O)c(OC)c3

Properties
Chemical formula	C_{16}H_{13}O_{7}^{+} (Cl^{−})
Molar mass	317.27 g/mol
- Except where otherwise noted, data are given for materials in their standard state (at 25 °C [77 °F], 100 kPa). verify (what is ?) Infobox references

Petunidin (Pt), like Europinidin and Malvidin, is derived from Delphinidin and is an O-methylated anthocyanidin of the 3-hydroxy type. It is a natural organic compound, a dark-red or purple water-soluble pigment found in many red berries including chokeberries (Aronia sp), Saskatoon berries (Amelanchier alnifolia) or different species of grape (for instance Vitis vinifera, or muscadine, Vitis rotundifolia), and also part of the pigments responsible for the petal colors in many flowers. This pigment gives the Indigo Rose tomatoes the majority of their deep purple color when the fruits are exposed to sunlight. The name of the molecule itself is derived from the word Petunia.

== Biosynthesis ==
Petunidin could form in the exocarp of fruits from delphinidin, with an anthocyanin flavonoid O-methyltransferase (Catechol-O-methyl transferase) catalyzing the B-ring methylation and S-Adenosyl-L-methyl-3H methionine being the methyl group donor.

== Glycosides ==
Glycoside forms of petunidin are present in grape. These include :

- Petunidin-3-O-glucoside
- Petunidin-3-O-(6-p-coumaroyl) glucoside
- Petunidin-3-O-(6-p-acetyl) glucoside
- Petunidin-3-O-galactoside
- Petunidin-3-rutinoside

The bark of Commiphora angolensis contains petunidin-3-rhamnoglucoside.

== Uses ==
Petunidin is referred as E165f, E163 and following numbers corresponding to anthocyanins in the food coloring E number list.

== See also ==
- List of phytochemicals in food
- List of antioxidants in food
