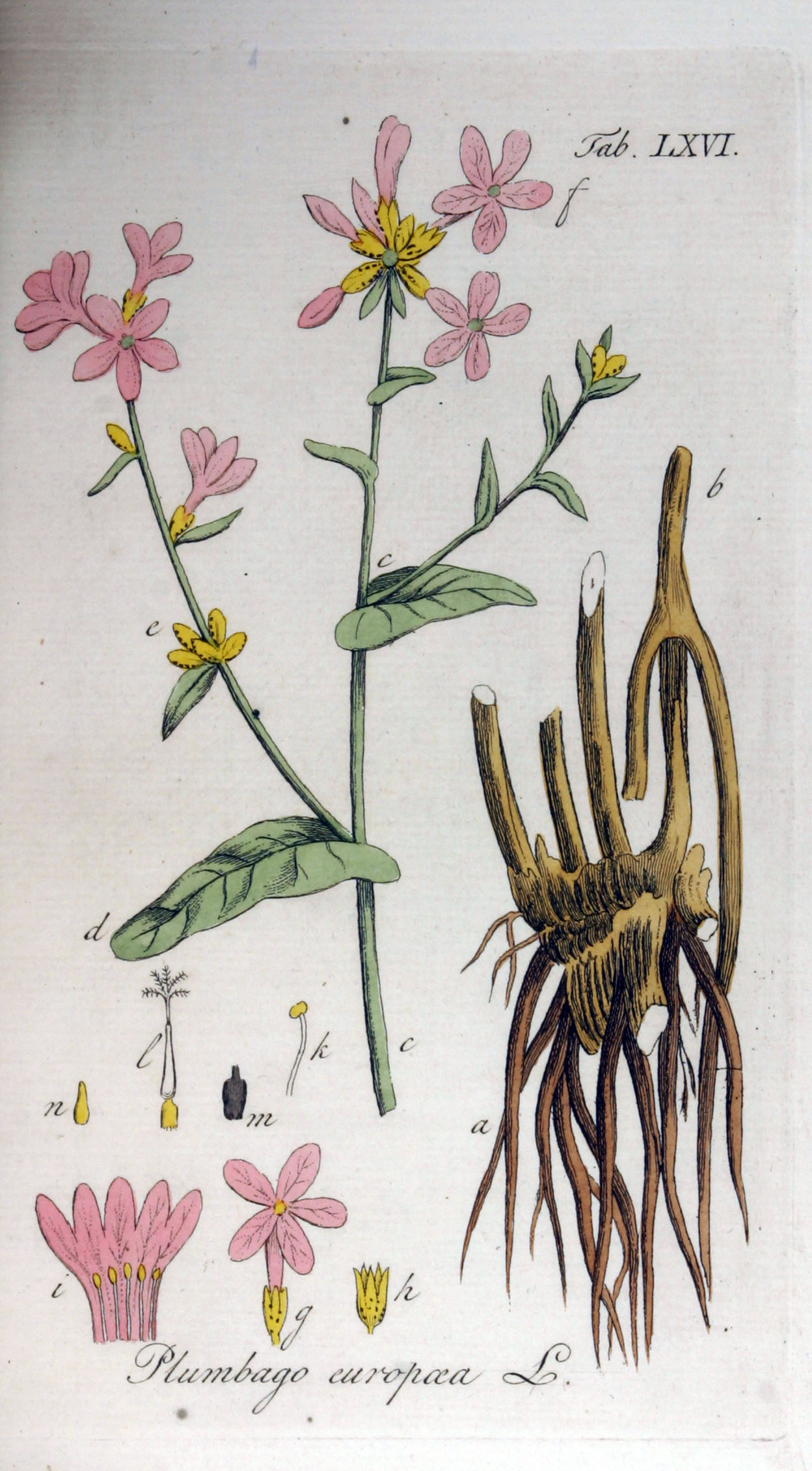

Scientific classification
- Kingdom: Plantae
- Clade: Tracheophytes
- Clade: Angiosperms
- Clade: Eudicots
- Order: Caryophyllales
- Family: Plumbaginaceae
- Genus: Plumbago
- Species: P. europaea

Binomial name
- Plumbago europaea L.

Synonyms
- Plumbago angustifolia Spach, Hist. Nat. Vég. (Spach) 10: 337. 1841.; Plumbago denticulata St.Lager, Étude Fl., ed. 8 [A. Cariot] 2: 690. 1889.; Plumbago europaea var. asperrima Sennen & Elías in Sennen, Pl. Espagne ??? n.° 2828; Plumbago europaea var. glandulosa Cout., Fl. Portugal ???. 1913.; Plumbago lapathifolia Willd., Sp. Pl., ed. 4 [Willdenow] 1(2): 837. 1798.; Plumbago purpurea Salisb., Prodr. Stirp. Chap. Allerton 122. 1796.; Plumbago undulata Moench, Suppl. Meth. (Moench) 153. 1802.

= Plumbago europaea =

Species of flowering plant

Plumbago europaea, also known as the common leadwort, is a plant species in the genus Plumbago found in the Mediterranean Basin and Central Asia.

Plumbago europaea produces the flavonol europetin.
