= Natsudaidain =

- Natsudaidain structure

Names
- IUPAC name 3-Hydroxy-3′,4′,5,6,7,8-hexamethoxyflavone
- Systematic IUPAC name 2-(3,4-Dimethoxyphenyl)-3-hydroxy-5,6,7,8-tetramethoxy-4H-1-benzopyran-4-one

Identifiers
CAS Number	35154-55-3
3D model (JSmol)	Interactive image
ChemSpider	2341642
PubChem CID	3084605
UNII	28441ILD21
CompTox Dashboard (EPA)	DTXSID00188655
- InChI: InChI=1S/C21H22O9/c1-24-11-8-7-10(9-12(11)25-2)16-15(23)14(22)13-17(26-3)19(27-4)21(29-6)20(28-5)18(13)30-16/h7-9,23H,1-6H3 Key: CCJBNIRSVUKABH-UHFFFAOYSA-N; InChI=1/C21H22O9/c1-24-11-8-7-10(9-12(11)25-2)16-15(23)14(22)13-17(26-3)19(27-4)21(29-6)20(28-5)18(13)30-16/h7-9,23H,1-6H3 Key: CCJBNIRSVUKABH-UHFFFAOYAO
- SMILES: COC1=C(C=C(C=C1)C2=C(C(=O)C3=C(O2)C(=C(C(=C3OC)OC)OC)OC)O)OC

Properties
Chemical formula	C_{21}H_{22}O_{9}
Molar mass	418.39 g/mol
- Except where otherwise noted, data are given for materials in their standard state (at 25 °C [77 °F], 100 kPa). verify (what is ?) Infobox references

Natsudaidain is an O-methylated flavonol, a type of chemical compound. It can be isolated from Citrus plants (Rutaceae). The name of the molecule comes from Citrus natsudaidai (Natsumikan, lit. "summer tangerine"), a fruit of Japan developed in 1740 with a particularly tart/sour taste.
