= Meciadanol =

- Chemical structure of meciadanol

Names
- IUPAC name 3-Methoxyflavan-3′,4′,5,7-tetrol
- Systematic IUPAC name (2R,3S)-2-(3,4-Dihydroxyphenyl)-3-methoxy-3,4-dihydro-2H-1-benzopyran-5,7-diol
- Other names 3-O-Methylcatechin; Meciadanolum; 3',4',5,7-Tetrahydroxy-3-methoxyflavan (2R,3S)-2-(3,4-Dihydroxyphenyl)-3-methoxy-5,7-chromandiol

Identifiers
CAS Number	65350-86-9
3D model (JSmol)	Interactive image
ChemSpider	8555738
ECHA InfoCard	100.059.719
PubChem CID	10380295
UNII	2H64SE2UXS
CompTox Dashboard (EPA)	DTXSID201024352
- InChI: InChI=1S/C16H16O6/c1-21-15-7-10-12(19)5-9(17)6-14(10)22-16(15)8-2-3-11(18)13(20)4-8/h2-6,15-20H,7H2,1H3/t15-,16+/m0/s1 Key: PDHSAQOQVUXZGQ-JKSUJKDBSA-N; InChI=1/C16H16O6/c1-21-15-7-10-12(19)5-9(17)6-14(10)22-16(15)8-2-3-11(18)13(20)4-8/h2-6,15-20H,7H2,1H3/t15-,16+/m0/s1 Key: PDHSAQOQVUXZGQ-JKSUJKDBBQ
- SMILES: CO[C@H]1CC2=C(C=C(C=C2O[C@@H]1C3=CC(=C(C=C3)O)O)O)O

Properties
Chemical formula	C_{16}H_{16}O_{6}
Molar mass	304.298 g·mol^{−1}
- Except where otherwise noted, data are given for materials in their standard state (at 25 °C [77 °F], 100 kPa). verify (what is ?) Infobox references

Meciadanol is a synthetic O-methylated flavanol. It is the 3-O-methylation of catechin.

It inhibits histidine decarboxylase in rats.
