= Techtochrysin =

- Techtochrysin structure

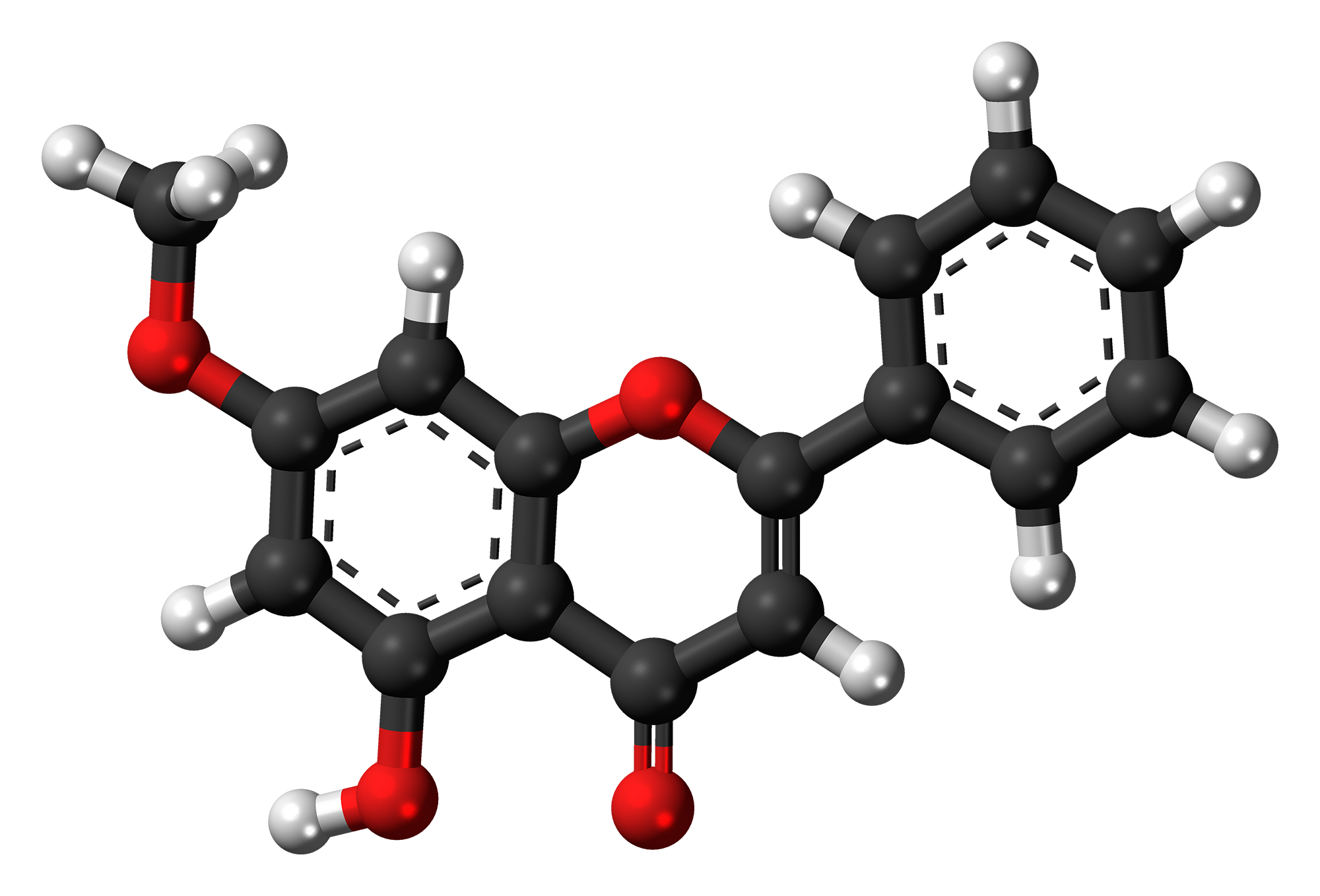

Names
- IUPAC name 5-Hydroxy-7-methoxyflavone
- Systematic IUPAC name 5-Hydroxy-7-methoxy-2-phenyl-4H-1-benzopyran-4-one
- Other names Tectochrysin; Methyl chrysin 7-Methoxy-5-hydroxyflavone

Identifiers
CAS Number	520-28-5
3D model (JSmol)	Interactive image
ChEBI	CHEBI:9426
ChemSpider	4445231
KEGG	C11621
PubChem CID	5281954
UNII	9UBO28W2AK
CompTox Dashboard (EPA)	DTXSID40199962
- InChI: InChI=1S/C16H12O4/c1-19-11-7-12(17)16-13(18)9-14(20-15(16)8-11)10-5-3-2-4-6-10/h2-9,17H,1H3 Key: IRZVHDLBAYNPCT-UHFFFAOYSA-N; InChI=1/C16H12O4/c1-19-11-7-12(17)16-13(18)9-14(20-15(16)8-11)10-5-3-2-4-6-10/h2-9,17H,1H3 Key: IRZVHDLBAYNPCT-UHFFFAOYAP
- SMILES: COC1=CC(=C2C(=C1)OC(=CC2=O)C3=CC=CC=C3)O

Properties
Chemical formula	C_{16}H_{12}O_{4}
Molar mass	268.26 g/mol
- Except where otherwise noted, data are given for materials in their standard state (at 25 °C [77 °F], 100 kPa). verify (what is ?) Infobox references

Techtochrysin is a chemical compound. It is an O-methylated flavone, a flavonoid isolated from Prunus cerasus, the sour cherry, a plant native to much of Europe and southwest Asia.

== Glycosides ==
- Techtochrysin 5-glucoside
