= Eupatilin =

Chemical compound

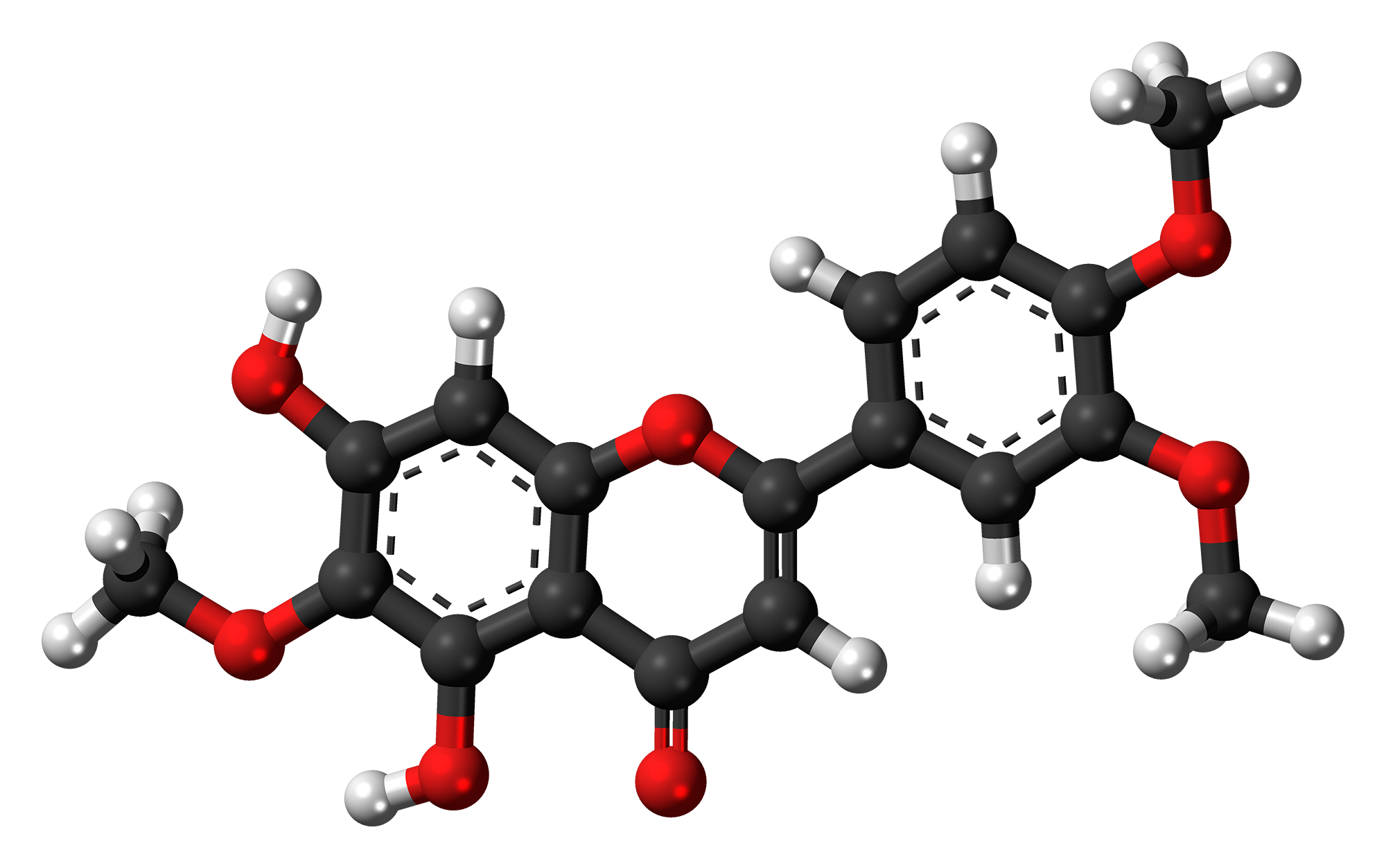

Clinical data
- Dependence liability: None
- Routes of administration: Oral
- ATC code: none

Legal status
- Legal status: CA: not available; UK: not available; US: not available; In general: ℞ (Prescription only)

Identifiers
- IUPAC name: 2-(3,4-Dimethoxyphenyl)-5,7-dihydroxy-6-methoxychromen-4-one
- CAS Number: 22368-21-4
- PubChem CID: 5273755
- ChemSpider: 4438134
- UNII: 4D58O05490
- CompTox Dashboard (EPA): DTXSID30176904

Chemical and physical data
- Formula: C_{18}H_{16}O_{7}
- Molar mass: 344.319 g·mol^{−1}
- 3D model (JSmol): Interactive image
- SMILES: O=C\1c3c(O)c(OC)c(O)cc3O/C(=C/1)c2ccc(OC)c(OC)c2
- InChI: InChI=1S/C18H16O7/c1-22-12-5-4-9(6-14(12)23-2)13-7-10(19)16-15(25-13)8-11(20)18(24-3)17(16)21/h4-8,20-21H,1-3H3; Key:DRRWBCNQOKKKOL-UHFFFAOYSA-N

Eupatilin (5,7-Dihydroxy-3',4',6-trimethoxyflavone) is an O-methylated flavone, a type of flavonoids. It can be found in Artemisia asiatica (Asteraceae).
