= Methylquercetagetin 6-O-methyltransferase =

Identifiers
- EC no.: 2.1.1.84
- CAS no.: 96477-60-0

Databases
- IntEnz: IntEnz view
- BRENDA: BRENDA entry
- ExPASy: NiceZyme view
- KEGG: KEGG entry
- MetaCyc: metabolic pathway
- PRIAM: profile
- PDB structures: RCSB PDB PDBe PDBsum
- Gene Ontology: AmiGO / QuickGO
Search
- PMC: articles
- PubMed: articles
- NCBI: proteins

Methylquercetagetin 6-O-methyltransferase (EC 2.1.1.84) is an enzyme that catalyzes the chemical reaction

tomentin
+ SAM
chrysosplenol D
+ SAH

This is a methylation reaction in which the O-methylated flavonoid, tomentin (methylquercetagetin), is converted to chrysosplenol D. The methyl group comes from the cofactor, S-adenosyl methionine (SAM), which becomes S-adenosyl-L-homocysteine (SAH). These compounds are found in Chrysosplenium americanum

This enzyme belongs to the family of transferases, specifically those transferring one-carbon group methyltransferases. The systematic name of this enzyme class is S-adenosyl-L-methionine:3',4',5,6-tetrahydroxy-3,7-dimethoxyflavone 6-O-methyltransferase. Other names in common use include flavonol 6-O-methyltransferase, flavonol 6-methyltransferase, 6-OMT, S-adenosyl-L-methionine:3',4',5,6-tetrahydroxy-3,7-dimethoxyflavone, and 6-O-methyltransferase.
