= 5-O-Methylmyricetin =

- Chemical structure of 5-O-methylmyricetin

Names
- IUPAC name 3,3′,4′,5′,7-Pentahydroxy-5-methoxyflavone
- Systematic IUPAC name 3,7-Dihydroxy-5-methoxy-2-(3,4,5-trihydroxyphenyl)-4H-1-benzopyran-4-one
- Other names 5-Methylmyricetin

Identifiers
CAS Number	19077-84-0
3D model (JSmol)	Interactive image; Interactive image
ChEMBL	ChEMBL4470965
ChemSpider	4477964
PubChem CID	5319731
CompTox Dashboard (EPA)	DTXSID201029314
- InChI: InChI=1S/C16H12O8/c1-23-10-4-7(17)5-11-12(10)14(21)15(22)16(24-11)6-2-8(18)13(20)9(19)3-6/h2-5,17-20,22H,1H3 Key: DDVGNSDGGWHPQZ-UHFFFAOYSA-N; InChI=1/C16H12O8/c1-23-10-4-7(17)5-11-12(10)14(21)15(22)16(24-11)6-2-8(18)13(20)9(19)3-6/h2-5,17-20,22H,1H3 Key: DDVGNSDGGWHPQZ-UHFFFAOYAT
- SMILES: COC1=C2C(=CC(=C1)O)OC(=C(C2=O)O)C3=CC(=C(C(=C3)O)O)O; O=C1c3c(O/C(=C1/O)c2cc(O)c(O)c(O)c2)cc(O)cc3OC

Properties
Chemical formula	C_{16}H_{12}O_{8}
Molar mass	332.264 g·mol^{−1}
Density	1.731 g/mL
- Except where otherwise noted, data are given for materials in their standard state (at 25 °C [77 °F], 100 kPa). verify (what is ?) Infobox references

5-O-Methylmyricetin is an O-methylated flavonol, a type of flavonoid. It is the 5-O-methyl derivative of myricetin. It occurs naturally and can also be synthesized.
