= Cyanidin =

Anthocyanidin pigment in flowering plant petals and fruits

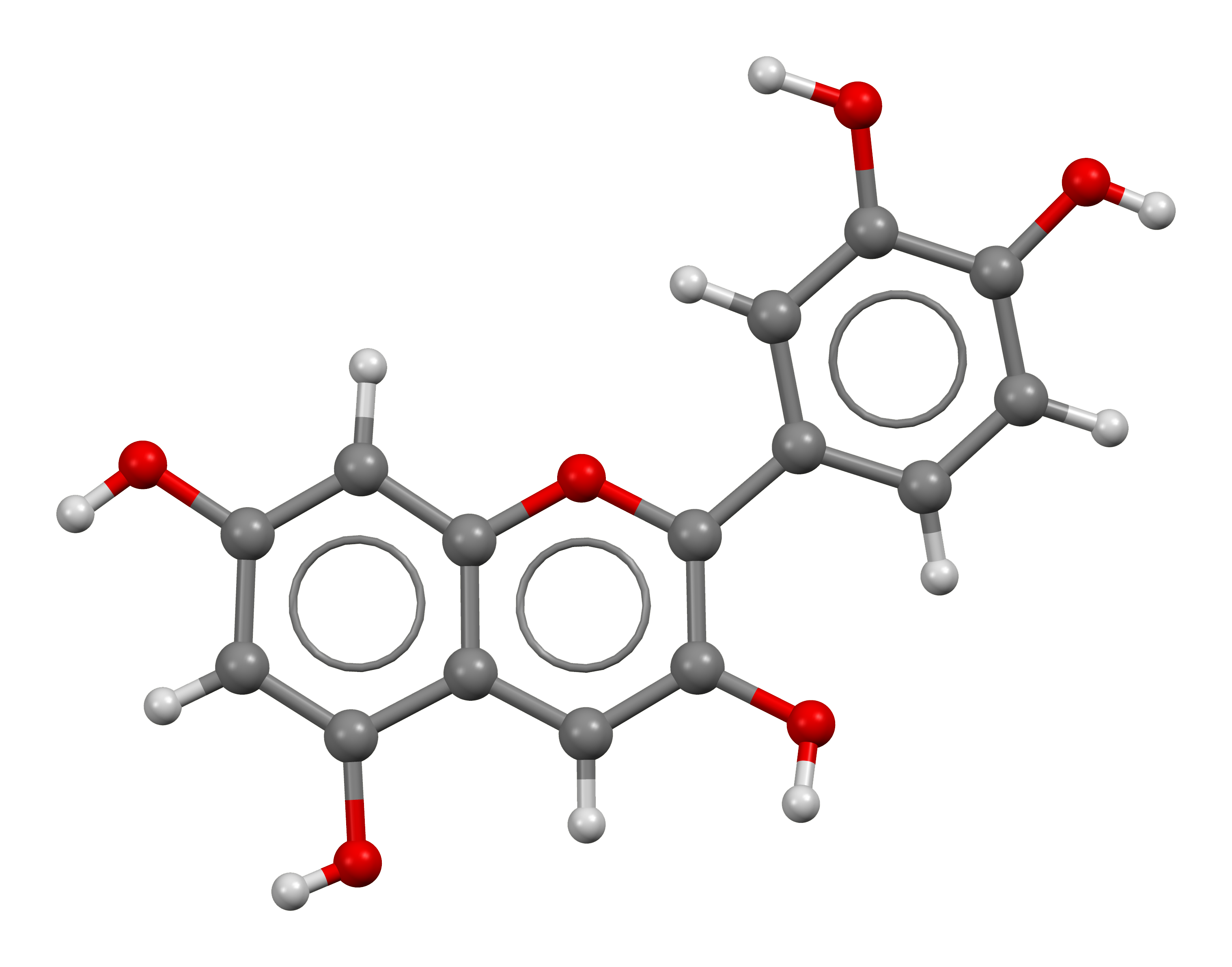

Names
- IUPAC name 3,3′,4′,5,7-Pentahydroxyflavylium
- Systematic IUPAC name 2-(3,4-Dihydroxyphenyl)-3,5,7-trihydroxy-1λ^{4}-benzopyran-1-ylium
- Other names Cyanidine; 2-(3,4-Dihydroxyphenyl)chromenylium-3,5,7-triol

Identifiers
CAS Number	13306-05-3; 528-58-5 (chloride)
3D model (JSmol)	Interactive image; Interactive image
ChEBI	CHEBI:27843
ChEMBL	ChEMBL404515
ChemSpider	114193
E number	E163a (colours)
KEGG	C05905
PubChem CID	128861
UNII	7732ZHU564; 2G4283G96U (chloride)
CompTox Dashboard (EPA)	DTXSID10157933
- InChI: InChI=1S/C15H10O6/c16-8-4-11(18)9-6-13(20)15(21-14(9)5-8)7-1-2-10(17)12(19)3-7/h1-6H,(H4-,16,17,18,19,20)/p+1 Key: VEVZSMAEJFVWIL-UHFFFAOYSA-O; InChI=1/C15H10O6/c16-8-4-11(18)9-6-13(20)15(21-14(9)5-8)7-1-2-10(17)12(19)3-7/h1-6H,(H4-,16,17,18,19,20)/p+1 Key: VEVZSMAEJFVWIL-IKLDFBCSAG
- SMILES: C1=CC(=C(C=C1C2=C(C=C3C(=CC(=CC3=[O+]2)O)O)O)O)O; Oc1ccc(cc1O)c3[o+]c2cc(O)cc(O)c2cc3O

Properties
Chemical formula	C_{15}H_{11}O_{6}^{+}
Molar mass	287.24 g/mol
- Except where otherwise noted, data are given for materials in their standard state (at 25 °C [77 °F], 100 kPa). verify (what is ?) Infobox references

Cyanidin (pH indicator)
below pH 3		above pH 11
3	⇌	11

Cyanidin is a natural organic compound. It is a particular type of anthocyanidin (glycoside version called anthocyanins). It is a pigment found in many red berries including grapes, bilberry, blackberry, blueberry, cherry, chokeberry, cranberry, elderberry, hawthorn, loganberry, açai berry and raspberry. It can also be found in other fruits such as apples and plums, and in red cabbage and red onion. It has a characteristic reddish-purple color, though this can change with pH; solutions of the compound are red at pH < 3, violet at pH 7-8, and blue at pH > 11. In certain fruits, the highest concentrations of cyanidin are found in the seeds and skin. Cyanidin has been found to be a potent sirtuin 6 (SIRT6) activator.

== List of cyanidin derivatives ==
- Antirrhinin (cyanidin-3-rutinoside or 3-C-R), found in black raspberry
- Cyanidin-3-xylosylrutinoside, found in black raspberry
- Cyanidin-3,4′-di-O-β-glucopyranoside, found in red onion
- Cyanidin-4′-O-β-glucoside, found in red onion
- Chrysanthemin (cyanidin-3-O-glucoside), found in blackcurrant pomace
- Idaein (cyanidin 3-O-galactoside), found in Vaccinium species
- Cyanin (cyanidin-3,5-O-diglucoside), found in red wine

== Biosynthesis ==
Cyanidin can be synthesized in berry plants through the shikimate pathway and polyketide synthase (PKS) III. The shikimate pathway is a biosynthetic pathways that uses the starting materials Phosphoenolpyruvic acid (PEP) and Erythrose 4-phosphate to form shikimic acid, which then further reacts to form specific aromatic amino acids. L-phenylalanine, which is necessary in the production of cyanidin, is synthesized through the shikimate pathway.

In the synthesis of L-phenylalanine, chorismate undergoes a Claisen rearrangement by a Chorismate mutase enzyme to form prephenate. Prephenate undergoes dehydration, decarboxylation, and transamination with Pyridoxal phosphate (PLP) and alpha-Ketoglutaric acid to form L-phenylalanine (figure 1).

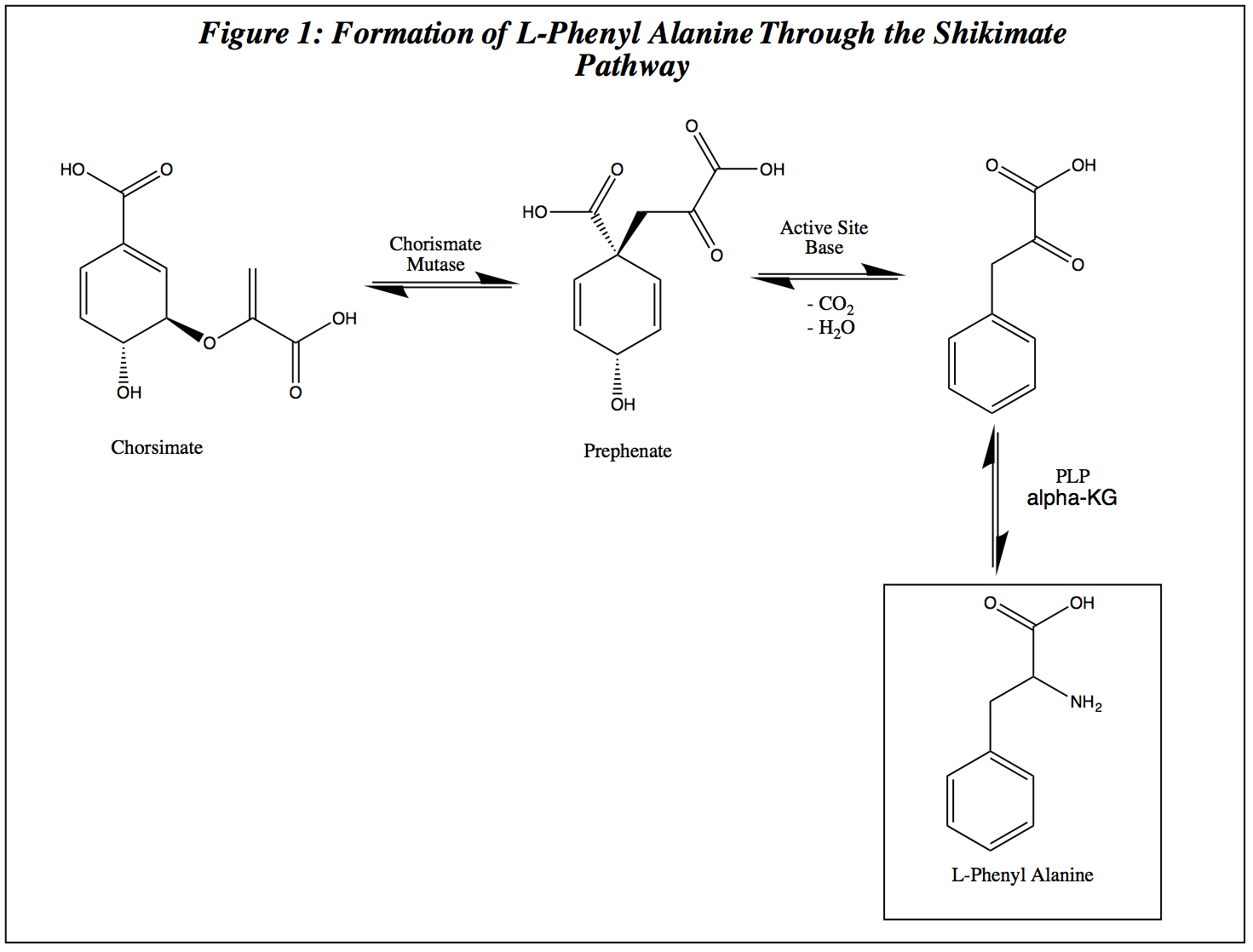

L-phenylalanine then undergoes an elimination of the primary amine with Phenylalanine ammonia-lyase (PAL) to form cinnamate. Through an oxidation with molecular oxygen and NADPH, a hydroxyl group is added to the para position of the aromatic ring. The compound then reacts with Coenzyme A (CoA), CoA ligase, and ATP to attach CoA to the carboxylic acid group. The compound reacts with naringenin-chalcone synthase and three malonyl CoA molecules to add six carbon atoms and three more keto groups ring through PKS III. Aureusidin synthase catalyses the aromatization and cyclization of the newly added carbonyl groups and facilitates the release of CoA. The compound then spontaneously cyclizes to form naringenin (figure 2).

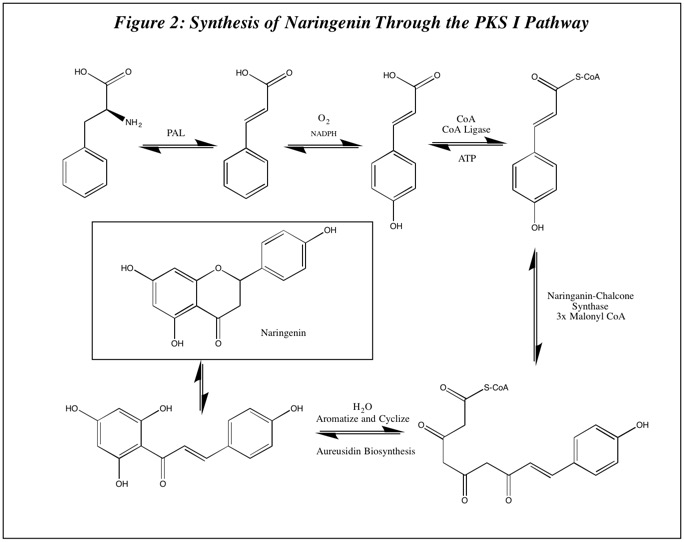

Naringenin is then converted to cyanidin through several oxidizing and reducing steps. First naringenin is reacted with two equivalents of oxygen, alpha-Ketogluteratic acid, and flavanone 3-hydroxylase to form dihydrokaempferol. The compound then reacts with NADPH and dihydroflavonol 4-reductase to form leucopelargonidin, which is further oxidized with oxygen, alpha-Ketogluteratic acid, and anthocyanidin synthase. This compound spontaneously loses a water molecule and a hydroxide ion to form cyanidin (figure 3).

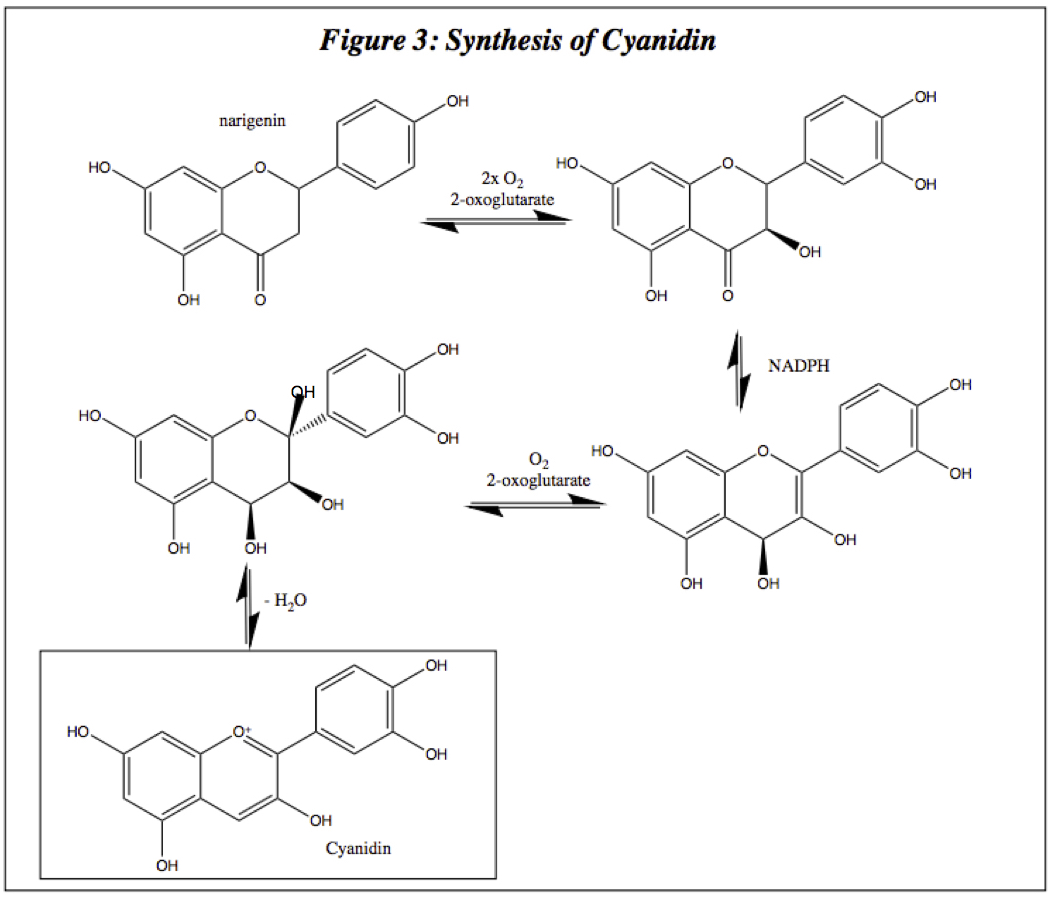

== Activation ==
Among many anthocyanidins studied, cyanidin most potently stimulated activity of the sirtuin 6 enzyme.
