= Sinensetin =

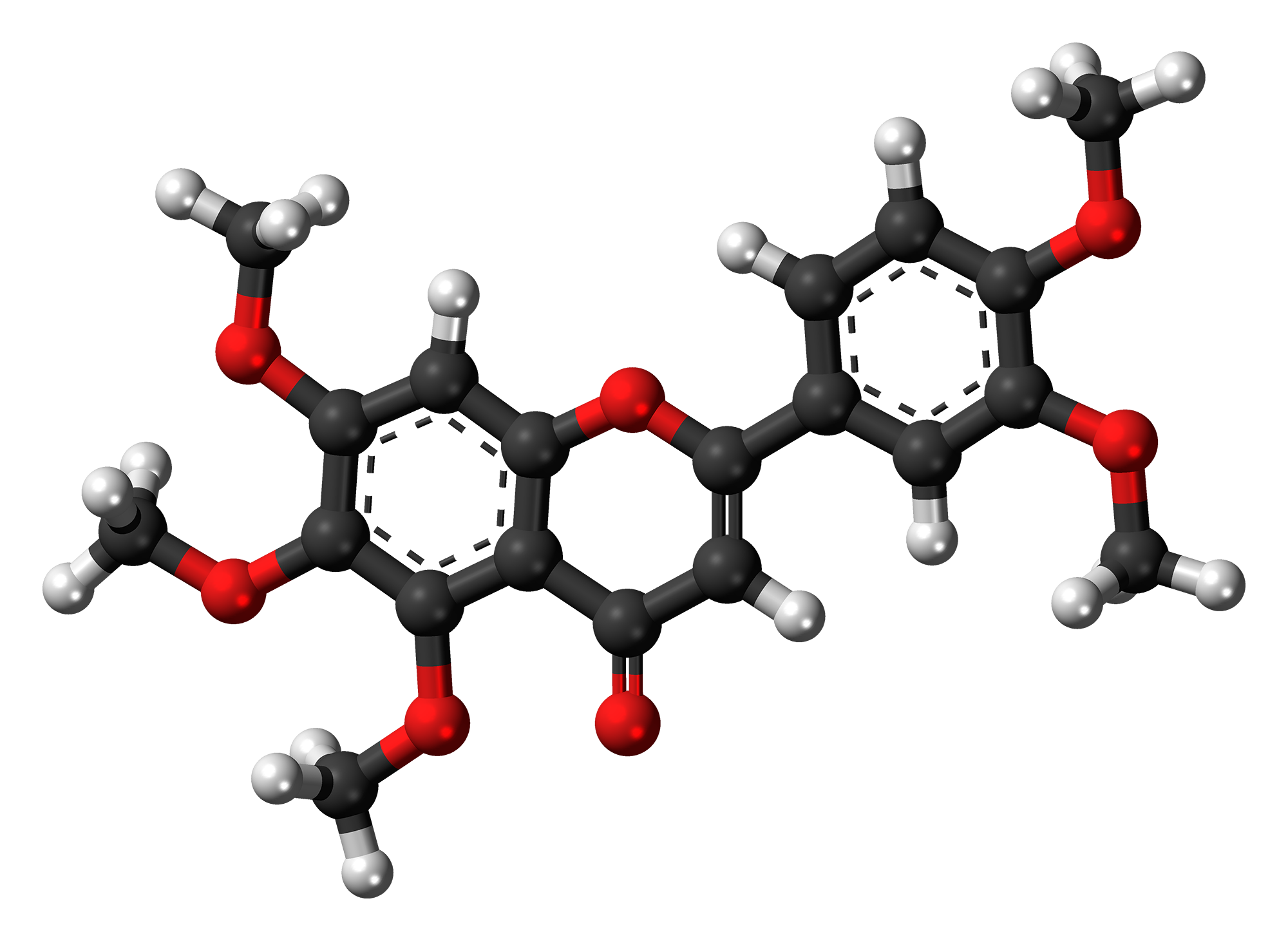

Names
- IUPAC name 3′,4′,5,6,7-Pentamethoxyflavone
- Systematic IUPAC name 2-(3,4-Dimethoxyphenyl)-5,6,7-trimethoxy-4H-1-benzopyran-4-one

Identifiers
CAS Number	2306-27-6
3D model (JSmol)	Interactive image
ChEBI	CHEBI:9159
ChEMBL	ChEMBL226507
ChemSpider	128491
ECHA InfoCard	100.230.396
PubChem CID	145659
UNII	240LNZ51AT
CompTox Dashboard (EPA)	DTXSID60177626
- InChI: InChI=1S/C20H20O7/c1-22-13-7-6-11(8-15(13)23-2)14-9-12(21)18-16(27-14)10-17(24-3)19(25-4)20(18)26-5/h6-10H,1-5H3 Key: LKMNXYDUQXAUCZ-UHFFFAOYSA-N
- SMILES: COC1=C(C=C(C=C1)C2=CC(=O)C3=C(C(=C(C=C3O2)OC)OC)OC)OC

Properties
Chemical formula	C_{20}H_{20}O_{7}
Molar mass	372.36 g/mol

Hazards
- GHS labelling
Pictograms	(GHS06: Toxic)
Signal word	Danger
Hazard statements	H301
Precautionary statements	P264, P270, P301+P310, P321, P330, P405, P501
- Except where otherwise noted, data are given for materials in their standard state (at 25 °C [77 °F], 100 kPa). verify (what is ?) Infobox references

Sinensetin is an O-methylated flavone. It can be found in Orthosiphon stamineus and in orange oil.
