= Pachypodol =

- Pachypodol structure

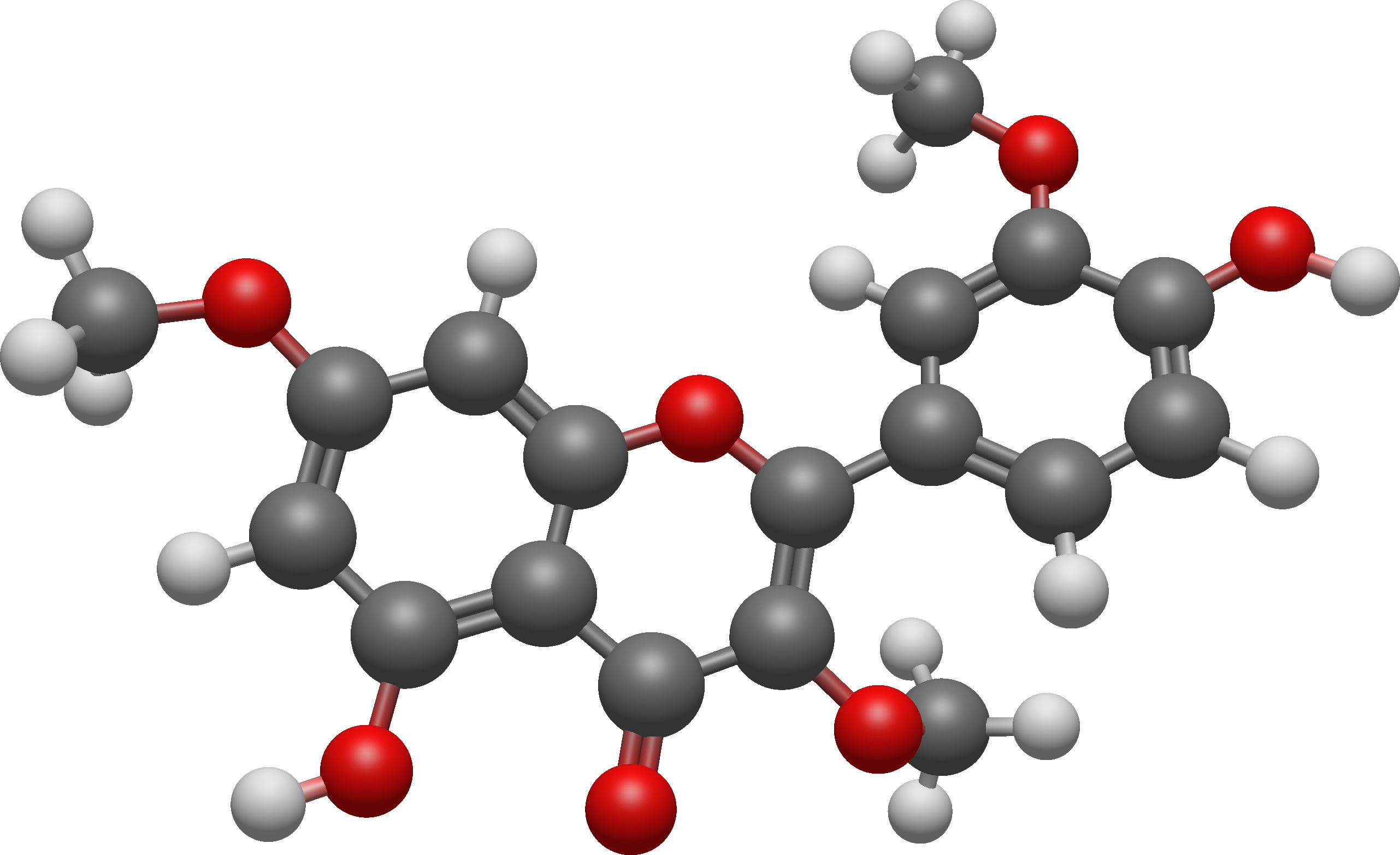
- Pachypodol 3D structure

Names
- IUPAC name 4′,5-Dihydroxy-3,3′,7-trimethoxyflavone
- Systematic IUPAC name 5-Hydroxy-2-(4-hydroxy-3-methoxyphenyl)-3,7-dimethoxy-4H-1-benzopyran-4-one
- Other names Quercetin 3,7,3'-trimethyl ether

Identifiers
| CAS Number | 33708-72-4 |
| 3D model (JSmol) | Interactive image |
| ChEBI | CHEBI:70007 |
| ChemSpider | 4444996 |
| MeSH | C008751 |
| PubChem CID | 5281677 |
| UNII | 8AG6B2DMP5 |
| CompTox Dashboard (EPA) | DTXSID80187388 |
- InChI: InChI=1S/C18H16O7/c1-22-10-7-12(20)15-14(8-10)25-17(18(24-3)16(15)21)9-4-5-11(19)13(6-9)23-2/h4-8,19-20H,1-3H3 Key: KQFUXLQBMQGNRT-UHFFFAOYSA-N; InChI=1/C18H16O7/c1-22-10-7-12(20)15-14(8-10)25-17(18(24-3)16(15)21)9-4-5-11(19)13(6-9)23-2/h4-8,19-20H,1-3H3 Key: KQFUXLQBMQGNRT-UHFFFAOYAA
- SMILES: COC1=CC(=C2C(=C1)OC(=C(C2=O)OC)C3=CC(=C(C=C3)O)OC)O

Properties
| Chemical formula | C_{18}H_{16}O_{7} |
| Molar mass | 344.319 g·mol^{−1} |
- Except where otherwise noted, data are given for materials in their standard state (at 25 °C [77 °F], 100 kPa). verify (what is ?) Infobox references

Pachypodol is a chemical compound classified as an O-methylated flavonol. It can be isolated from a variety of plants including Calycopteris floribunda, Pogostemon cablin, and Croton ciliatoglanduliferus.
