= Aurantinidin =

Names
- IUPAC name 3,4′,5,6,7-Pentahydroxyflavylium
- Systematic IUPAC name 3,5,6,7-Tetrahydroxy-2-(4-hydroxyphenyl)-1λ^{4}-benzopyran-1-ylium
- Other names 6-Hydroxypelargonidine

Identifiers
CAS Number	25041-66-1
3D model (JSmol)	Interactive image
ChemSpider	390278
PubChem CID	441648
UNII	D53KRD9FB8
CompTox Dashboard (EPA)	DTXSID40331603
- InChI: InChI=1S/C15H10O6/c16-8-3-1-7(2-4-8)15-11(18)5-9-12(21-15)6-10(17)14(20)13(9)19/h1-6H,(H4-,16,17,18,19,20)/p+1 Key: VGONRPRFJVEJKB-UHFFFAOYSA-O; InChI=1/C15H10O6/c16-8-3-1-7(2-4-8)15-11(18)5-9-12(21-15)6-10(17)14(20)13(9)19/h1-6H,(H4-,16,17,18,19,20)/p+1 Key: VGONRPRFJVEJKB-IKLDFBCSAP
- SMILES: Oc1ccc(cc1)c3[o+]c2cc(O)c(O)c(O)c2cc3O

Properties
Chemical formula	C_{15}H_{11}O_{6}^{+}
Molar mass	287.24 g/mol
- Except where otherwise noted, data are given for materials in their standard state (at 25 °C [77 °F], 100 kPa). verify (what is ?) Infobox references

Aurantinidin is a water-soluble, red plant dye. It is a member of the class of compounds known as anthocyanidins and is a hydroxy derivative of pelargonidin. Aurantinidin has been reported to occur in Impatiens aurantiaca (Balsaminaceae), and also in cultivars from genus Alstroemeria.
