= Annulatin =

- Chemical structure of annulatin

Names
- IUPAC name 3′,4′,5,5′,7-Pentahydroxy-3-methoxyflavone
- Systematic IUPAC name 5,7-Dihydroxy-3-methoxy-2-(3,4,5-trihydroxyphenyl)-4H-1-benzopyran-4-one
- Other names Myricetin 3-Methylether

Identifiers
CAS Number	1486-67-5
3D model (JSmol)	Interactive image
ChemSpider	24227213
PubChem CID	44259709
UNII	E49FR3626E
CompTox Dashboard (EPA)	DTXSID40658069
- InChI: InChI=1S/C16H12O8/c1-23-16-14(22)12-8(18)4-7(17)5-11(12)24-15(16)6-2-9(19)13(21)10(20)3-6/h2-5,17-21H,1H3 Key: XWTLYULBWZQAAZ-UHFFFAOYSA-N; InChI=1/C16H12O8/c1-23-16-14(22)12-8(18)4-7(17)5-11(12)24-15(16)6-2-9(19)13(21)10(20)3-6/h2-5,17-21H,1H3 Key: XWTLYULBWZQAAZ-UHFFFAOYAS
- SMILES: COc1c(=O)c2c(cc(cc2oc1c3cc(c(c(c3)O)O)O)O)O

Properties
Chemical formula	C_{16}H_{12}O_{8}
Molar mass	332.264 g·mol^{−1}
Density	1.807 g/mL
- Except where otherwise noted, data are given for materials in their standard state (at 25 °C [77 °F], 100 kPa). verify (what is ?) Infobox references

Annulatin is an O-methylated flavonol found in the roots of Pteroxygonum giraldii.
