= Nepetin =

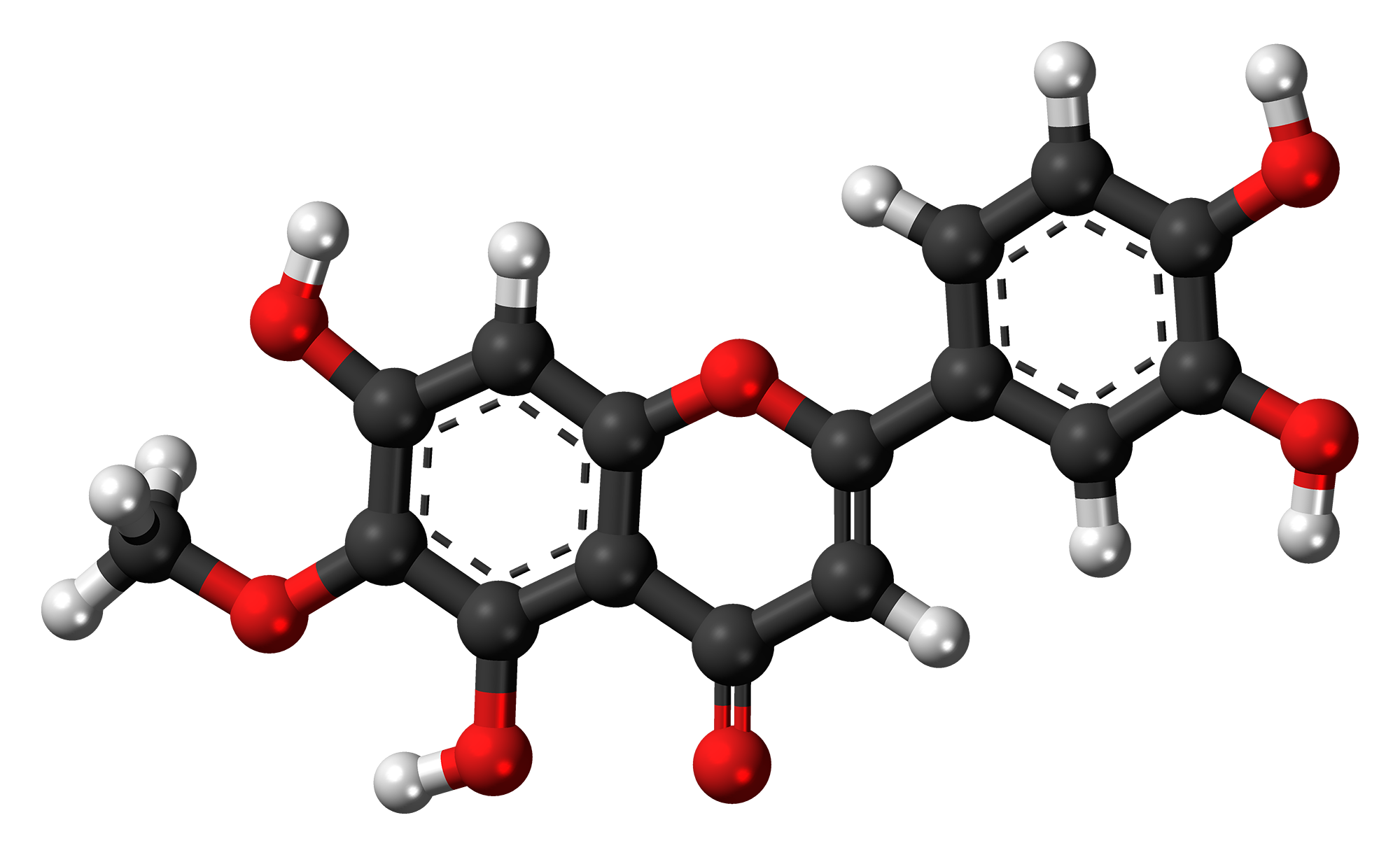

Names
- IUPAC name 3′,4′,5,7-Tetrahydroxy-6-methoxyflavone
- Systematic IUPAC name 2-(3,4-Dihydroxyphenyl)-5,7-dihydroxy-6-methoxy-4H-1-benzopyran-4-one
- Other names 6-Methoxyluteolin

Identifiers
CAS Number	520-11-6
3D model (JSmol)	Interactive image
ChEMBL	ChEMBL172350
ChemSpider	4476172
PubChem CID	5317284
UNII	I3O7LF3GED
CompTox Dashboard (EPA)	DTXSID10199959
- InChI: InChI=1S/C16H12O7/c1-22-16-11(20)6-13-14(15(16)21)10(19)5-12(23-13)7-2-3-8(17)9(18)4-7/h2-6,17-18,20-21H,1H3 Key: FHHSEFRSDKWJKJ-UHFFFAOYSA-N; InChI=1/C16H12O7/c1-22-16-11(20)6-13-14(15(16)21)10(19)5-12(23-13)7-2-3-8(17)9(18)4-7/h2-6,17-18,20-21H,1H3 Key: FHHSEFRSDKWJKJ-UHFFFAOYAR
- SMILES: COC1=C(C2=C(C=C1O)OC(=CC2=O)C3=CC(=C(C=C3)O)O)O

Properties
Chemical formula	C_{16}H_{12}O_{7}
Molar mass	316.26 g/mol
- Except where otherwise noted, data are given for materials in their standard state (at 25 °C [77 °F], 100 kPa). verify (what is ?) Infobox references

Nepetin is the 6-methoxy derivative of the pentahydroxyflavone 6-hydroxyluteolin, an O-methylated flavone. It can be found in Eupatorium ballotaefolium.

== Glycosides ==
Nepitrin is the 7-glucoside of nepetin.
