= Europetin =

- Chemical structure of europetin

Names
- IUPAC name 3,5,3′,4′,5′-Pentahydroxy-7-methoxyflavone
- Systematic IUPAC name 3,5-Dihydroxy-7-methoxy-2-(3,4,5-trihydroxyphenyl)-4H-1-benzopyran-4-one
- Other names 7-Methylmyricetin

Identifiers
CAS Number	16280-27-6
3D model (JSmol)	Interactive image
ChEBI	CHEBI:145786
ChemSpider	24845329
PubChem CID	44259636
UNII	PC84K5ZS4X
CompTox Dashboard (EPA)	DTXSID80658068
- InChI: InChI=1S/C16H12O8/c1-23-7-4-8(17)12-11(5-7)24-16(15(22)14(12)21)6-2-9(18)13(20)10(19)3-6/h2-5,17-20,22H,1H3 Key: BDZXSHDKBKYQKJ-UHFFFAOYSA-N
- SMILES: COC1=CC(=C2C(=C1)OC(=C(C2=O)O)C3=CC(=C(C(=C3)O)O)O)O

Properties
Chemical formula	C_{16}H_{12}O_{8}
Molar mass	332.264 g·mol^{−1}
- Except where otherwise noted, data are given for materials in their standard state (at 25 °C [77 °F], 100 kPa). verify (what is ?) Infobox references

Europetin is an O-methylated flavonol. It can be found in Plumbago europaea and it can be prepared synthetically.
