= Rosinidin =

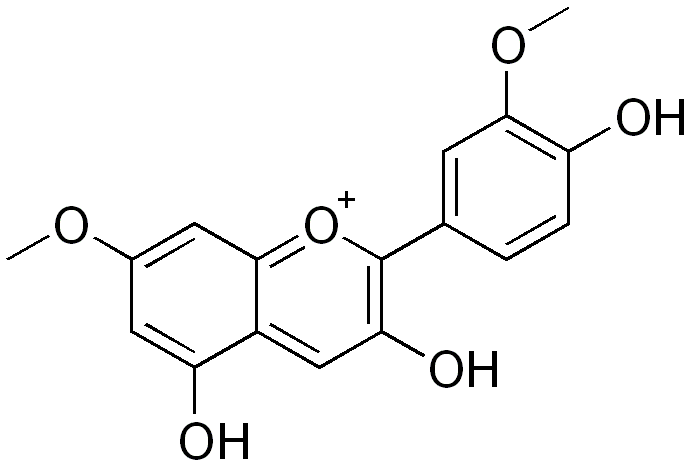

Names
- IUPAC name 3,4′,5-Trihydroxy-3′,7-dimethoxyflavylium
- Systematic IUPAC name 3,5-Dihydroxy-2-(4-hydroxy-3-methoxyphenyl)-7-methoxy-1λ^{4}-benzopyran-1-ylium

Identifiers
CAS Number	4092-64-2
3D model (JSmol)	Interactive image
ChEBI	CHEBI:8893
ChemSpider	390373
PubChem CID	441777
UNII	UV4WFM3878
CompTox Dashboard (EPA)	DTXSID80331627
- InChI: InChI=1S/C17H14O6/c1-21-10-6-13(19)11-8-14(20)17(23-15(11)7-10)9-3-4-12(18)16(5-9)22-2/h3-8H,1-2H3,(H2-,18,19,20)/p+1 Key: GNONHFYAESLOCB-UHFFFAOYSA-O; InChI=1/C17H14O6/c1-21-10-6-13(19)11-8-14(20)17(23-15(11)7-10)9-3-4-12(18)16(5-9)22-2/h3-8H,1-2H3,(H2-,18,19,20)/p+1 Key: GNONHFYAESLOCB-IKLDFBCSAN
- SMILES: Oc1cc2c(O)cc(OC)cc2[o+]c1c3cc(OC)c(O)cc3

Properties
Chemical formula	C_{17}H_{15}O_{6}+
Molar mass	315.30 g/mol
- Except where otherwise noted, data are given for materials in their standard state (at 25 °C [77 °F], 100 kPa). verify (what is ?) Infobox references

Rosinidin is an O-methylated anthocyanidin derived from Cyanidin. It is a pigment found in the flowers of Catharanthus roseus and, in lower concentration, in Primula rosea.
