= Nobiletin =

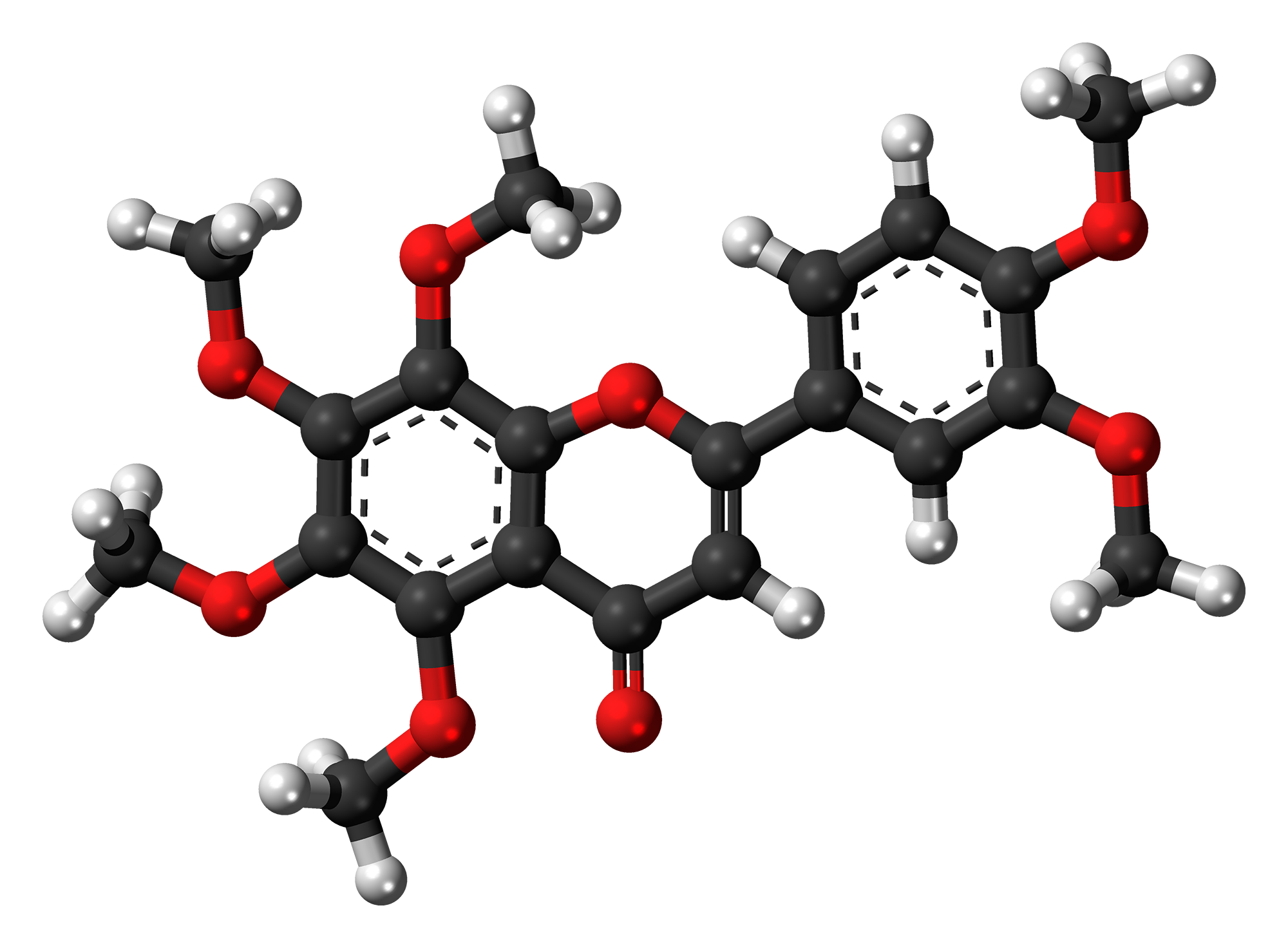

Names
- IUPAC name 3′,4′,5,6,7,8-Hexamethoxyflavone
- Systematic IUPAC name 2-(3,4-Dimethoxyphenyl)-5,6,7,8-tetramethoxy-4H-1-benzopyran-4-one
- Other names Hexamethoxyflavone

Identifiers
CAS Number	478-01-3
3D model (JSmol)	Interactive image
ChEBI	CHEBI:7602
ChemSpider	65283
KEGG	C10112
PubChem CID	72344
UNII	D65ILJ7WLY
CompTox Dashboard (EPA)	DTXSID30197275
- InChI: InChI=1S/C21H22O8/c1-23-13-8-7-11(9-15(13)24-2)14-10-12(22)16-17(25-3)19(26-4)21(28-6)20(27-5)18(16)29-14/h7-10H,1-6H3 Key: MRIAQLRQZPPODS-UHFFFAOYSA-N; InChI=1/C21H22O8/c1-23-13-8-7-11(9-15(13)24-2)14-10-12(22)16-17(25-3)19(26-4)21(28-6)20(27-5)18(16)29-14/h7-10H,1-6H3 Key: MRIAQLRQZPPODS-UHFFFAOYAI
- SMILES: c1c(OC)c(OC)ccc1C2=CC(=O)c3c(OC)c(OC)c(OC)c(OC)c3O2

Properties
Chemical formula	C_{21}H_{22}O_{8}
Molar mass	402.399 g·mol^{−1}
- Except where otherwise noted, data are given for materials in their standard state (at 25 °C [77 °F], 100 kPa). verify (what is ?) Infobox references

Nobiletin is a flavonoid isolated from citrus peels. It is an O-methylated flavone that has the activity to rescue bulbectomy-induced memory impairment.

== Potential pharmacology ==
Nobiletin was found to potentially inhibit cartilage degradation.

Nobiletin was shown to augment AMPA receptor activity and long-term potentiation in cell culture. Synergistic chemopreventive effects of nobiletin and atorvastatin on colon carcinogenesis have been described. Nobiletin enhances antitumor efficacy via suppression of IκB/NF-κB signaling in triple-negative breast cancer.
