= Europinidin =

Names
- IUPAC name 3,3′,4′,7-Tetrahydroxy-5,5′-dimethoxyflavylium
- Systematic IUPAC name 2-(3,4-Dihydroxy-5-methoxyphenyl)-5-methoxy-3,7-dimethyl-1λ^{4}-benzopyran-1-ylium
- Other names 5,3′-Di-O-methyldelphinidin

Identifiers
CAS Number	19077-87-3
3D model (JSmol)	Interactive image
ChemSpider	24842463
PubChem CID	14496547
UNII	PRX7D7G84W
CompTox Dashboard (EPA)	DTXSID90561014
- InChI: InChI=1S/C17H14O7/c1-22-13-5-9(18)6-14-10(13)7-12(20)17(24-14)8-3-11(19)16(21)15(4-8)23-2/h3-7H,1-2H3,(H3-,18,19,20,21)/p+1 Key: XJXMPIWHBIOJSH-UHFFFAOYSA-O
- SMILES: Oc1cc2c(OC)cc(O)cc2[o+]c1c3cc(OC)c(O)c(O)c3

Properties
Chemical formula	C_{17}H_{15}O_{7}^{+} (, Cl^{−})
Molar mass	331.30 g/mol
- Except where otherwise noted, data are given for materials in their standard state (at 25 °C [77 °F], 100 kPa). verify (what is ?) Infobox references

Europinidin (Eu) is an O-methylated anthocyanidin. It is a water-soluble, bluish red plant dye. It is a rare O-methylated flavonoid, a derivative of delphinidin. It can be found in some species of Plumbago and Ceratostigma.
