= Hirsutidin =

Names
- IUPAC name 3,4′,5-Trihydroxy-3′,5′,7-trimethoxyflavylium
- Systematic IUPAC name 3,5-Dihydroxy-2-(4-hydroxy-3,5-dimethoxyphenyl)-7-methoxy-1λ^{4}-benzopyran-1-ylium

Identifiers
CAS Number	151776-57-7; (chloride): 4092-66-4
3D model (JSmol)	Interactive image
ChEBI	CHEBI:5728
ChemSpider	390303
PubChem CID	441694
UNII	VV9H579AR2; (chloride): UX37SFW7Y9
CompTox Dashboard (EPA)	DTXSID40961303
- InChI: InChI=1S/C18H16O7/c1-22-10-6-12(19)11-8-13(20)18(25-14(11)7-10)9-4-15(23-2)17(21)16(5-9)24-3/h4-8H,1-3H3,(H2-,19,20,21)/p+1 Key: JGPCLGHKWGCWNO-UHFFFAOYSA-O; InChI=1/C18H16O7/c1-22-10-6-12(19)11-8-13(20)18(25-14(11)7-10)9-4-15(23-2)17(21)16(5-9)24-3/h4-8H,1-3H3,(H2-,19,20,21)/p+1 Key: JGPCLGHKWGCWNO-IKLDFBCSAS
- SMILES: Oc1cc2c(O)cc(OC)cc2[o+]c1c3cc(OC)c(O)c(OC)c3

Properties
Chemical formula	C_{18}H_{17}O_{7}+
Molar mass	345.32 g/mol
- Except where otherwise noted, data are given for materials in their standard state (at 25 °C [77 °F], 100 kPa). verify (what is ?) Infobox references

Hirsutidin is an O-methylated anthocyanidin, a chemical compound belonging to the anthocyanins. It can be found in Catharanthus roseus (Madagascar periwinkle) where it is the prominent compound in petals and can also be found in callus cultures.

== Glycosides ==
3-O-(6-O-p-coumaroyl) glucoside of hirsutidin can also be found in Catharanthus roseus.
