= O-methylated flavonoid =

Flavonoid with a methylated hydroxy group

The O-methylated flavonoids or methoxyflavonoids are flavonoids with methylations on hydroxyl groups (methoxy bonds). O-methylation has an effect on the solubility of flavonoids.

== Enzymes ==
O-methylated flavonoids formation implies the presence of specific O-methyltransferase (OMT) enzymes which accept a variety of substrates. Those enzymes mediate the O-methylation on a specific hydroxyl group, like on 4' (example in Catharanthus roseus) or 3' (example in rice) positions. Those positions can be ortho, meta, para and there can be a special 3-O-methyltransferase for the 3-OH position. Calamondin orange (Citrus mitis) exhibits all of those activities.

=== Plant enzymes ===
- Apigenin 4'-O-methyltransferase
- 8-hydroxyquercetin 8-O-methyltransferase
- Isoflavone 4'-O-methyltransferase
- Isoflavone 7-O-methyltransferase
- Isoliquiritigenin 2'-O-methyltransferase
- Isoorientin 3'-O-methyltransferase
- Kaempferol 4'-O-methyltransferase
- Luteolin O-methyltransferase
- Methylquercetagetin 6-O-methyltransferase
- 3-methylquercetin 7-O-methyltransferase
- Myricetin O-methyltransferase
- Quercetin 3-O-methyltransferase
- Vitexin 2"-O-rhamnoside 7-O-methyltransferase

=== Animal enzyme ===
- Catechol-O-methyl transferase

== O-methylated anthocyanidins ==
- 5-Desoxy-malvidin
- Capensinidin
- Europinidin
- Hirsutidin
- Malvidin
- Peonidin
- Petunidin
- Pulchellidin
- Rosinidin

== O-methylated flavanols ==
- Meciadanol (3-O'methyl catechin)

== O-methylated flavanones ==
- Hesperetin
- Homoeriodictyol
- Isosakuranetin
- Sakuranetin
- Sterubin

== O-methylated flavanonols ==
- Dihydrokaempferide

== O-methylated flavonols ==
of kaempferol

- Kaempferide

of myricetin

- Annulatin
- Combretol
- Europetin
- Laricitrin (3'-O-Dimethylmyricetin)
- 5-O-methylmyricetin
- Syringetin (3',5'-O-Dimethylmyricetin)

of quercetin

- Ayanin
- Azaleatin
- Isorhamnetin
- Ombuin
- Pachypodol
- Retusin (quercetin-3,7,3',4'-tetramethyl ether)
- Rhamnazin
- Rhamnetin
- Tamarixetin

other

- Eupatolitin
- Natsudaidain

== O-methylated flavones ==
- Acacetin
- Chrysoeriol
- Diosmetin
- Nepetin
- Nobiletin
- Oroxylin-A
- Sinensetin
- Tangeritin (Tangeretin)
- Thevetiaflavone
- Wogonin

== O-methylated isoflavones ==
- Biochanin A
- Calycosin
- Formononetin
- Glycitein
- Irigenin
- 5-O-methylgenistein
- Pratensein
- Prunetin
- Psi-tectorigenin
- Retusin
- Tectorigenin

== See also ==
- C-methylated flavonoid
