= Capensinidin =

Names
- IUPAC name 3,4′,7-Trihydroxy-3′,5,5′-trimethoxyflavylium
- Systematic IUPAC name 3,7-Dihydroxy-2-(4-hydroxy-3,5-dimethoxyphenyl)-5-methoxy-1λ^{4}-benzopyran-1-ylium
- Other names Capensinidin chloride

Identifiers
CAS Number	19077-85-1
3D model (JSmol)	Interactive image
ChEBI	CHEBI:3367
ChemSpider	390280
KEGG	C08595
PubChem CID	441658
UNII	4B8JXD85D6
CompTox Dashboard (EPA)	DTXSID00331604
- InChI: InChI=1S/C18H16O7/c1-22-13-6-10(19)7-14-11(13)8-12(20)18(25-14)9-4-15(23-2)17(21)16(5-9)24-3/h4-8H,1-3H3,(H2-,19,20,21)/p+1 Key: GYLVPQXQQPMCKK-UHFFFAOYSA-O; InChI=1/C18H16O7/c1-22-13-6-10(19)7-14-11(13)8-12(20)18(25-14)9-4-15(23-2)17(21)16(5-9)24-3/h4-8H,1-3H3,(H2-,19,20,21)/p+1 Key: GYLVPQXQQPMCKK-IKLDFBCSAS
- SMILES: Oc1cc2c(OC)cc(O)cc2[o+]c1c3cc(OC)c(O)c(OC)c3

Properties
Chemical formula	C_{18}H_{17}O_{7}^{+} (Cl^{−})
Molar mass	345.32 g/mol
- Except where otherwise noted, data are given for materials in their standard state (at 25 °C [77 °F], 100 kPa). verify (what is ?) Infobox references

Capensinidin (Cp) is an O-methylated anthocyanidin. It is a water-soluble, blue-red plant dye. It is a 5-methoxy analog of malvidin, has been obtained from Plumbago capensis.
