= Artemisia asiatica =

Artemisia asiatica is a plant name that has been used for two different species in the genus Artemisia.

- Artemisia asiatica Nakai ex Pamp. is a synonym of Artemisia indica
- Artemisia asiatica Nakai ex Kitam. is a synonym of Artemisia dubia Wall.
