= Cirsilineol =

Names
- IUPAC name 4′,5-Dihydroxy-3′,6,7-trimethoxyflavone
- Systematic IUPAC name 5-Hydroxy-2-(4-hydroxy-3-methoxyphenyl)-6,7-dimethoxy-4H-1-benzopyran-4-one
- Other names Eupatrin

Identifiers
CAS Number	41365-32-6
3D model (JSmol)	Interactive image
ChEBI	CHEBI:3718
ChemSpider	142644
PubChem CID	162464
UNII	08DZZ529FE
CompTox Dashboard (EPA)	DTXSID20194314
- InChI: InChI=1S/C18H16O7/c1-22-13-6-9(4-5-10(13)19)12-7-11(20)16-14(25-12)8-15(23-2)18(24-3)17(16)21/h4-8,19,21H,1-3H3 Key: VKOSQMWSWLZQPA-UHFFFAOYSA-N; InChI=1S/C18H16O7/c1-22-13-6-9(4-5-10(13)19)12-7-11(20)16-14(25-12)8-15(23-2)18(24-3)17(16)21/h4-8,19,21H,1-3H3 Key: VKOSQMWSWLZQPA-UHFFFAOYSA-N
- SMILES: COC1=C(C=CC(=C1)C2=CC(=O)C3=C(C(=C(C=C3O2)OC)OC)O)O

Properties
Chemical formula	C_{18}H_{16}O_{7}
Molar mass	344.319 g·mol^{−1}
- Except where otherwise noted, data are given for materials in their standard state (at 25 °C [77 °F], 100 kPa). Infobox references

Cirsilineol is a bioactive flavone isolated from Artemisia and from Teucrium gnaphalodes.
