= Delphinidin =

Names
- IUPAC name 3,3′,4′,5,5′,7-Hexahydroxyflavylium
- Systematic IUPAC name 3,5,7-Trihydroxy-2-(3,4,5-trihydroxyphenyl)-1λ^{4}-1-benzopyran-1-ylium

Identifiers
CAS Number	13270-61-6; 528-53-0 (chloride)
3D model (JSmol)	Interactive image
ChEBI	CHEBI:28436
ChEMBL	ChEMBL590878; ChEMBL276780
ChemSpider	114185
ECHA InfoCard	100.007.671
E number	E163b (colours)
KEGG	C05908
PubChem CID	68245
UNII	031A4BN94T; EM6MD4AEHE (chloride)
CompTox Dashboard (EPA)	DTXSID701019982
- InChI: InChI=1S/C15H10O7.ClH/c16-7-3-9(17)8-5-12(20)15(22-13(8)4-7)6-1-10(18)14(21)11(19)2-6;/h1-5H,(H5-,16,17,18,19,20,21);1H Key: FFNDMZIBVDSQFI-UHFFFAOYSA-N; InChI=1/C15H10O7.ClH/c16-7-3-9(17)8-5-12(20)15(22-13(8)4-7)6-1-10(18)14(21)11(19)2-6;/h1-5H,(H5-,16,17,18,19,20,21);1H Key: FFNDMZIBVDSQFI-UHFFFAOYAW
- SMILES: C1=C(C=C(C(=C1O)O)O)C2=C(C=C3C(=CC(=CC3=[O+]2)O)O)O.[Cl-]

Properties
Chemical formula	C_{15}H_{11}O_{7}^{+}
Molar mass	303.24 g/mol
- Except where otherwise noted, data are given for materials in their standard state (at 25 °C [77 °F], 100 kPa). verify (what is ?) Infobox references

Delphinidin (also delphinidine) is an anthocyanidin, a primary plant pigment, and also an antioxidant. Delphinidin gives blue hues to flowers in the genera Viola and Delphinium. It also gives the blue-red color of the grape variety Cabernet Sauvignon, and can be found in cranberries and Concord grapes as well as pomegranates, and bilberries.

Delphinidin, like nearly all other anthocyanidins, is pH-sensitive, i.e. a natural pH indicator, and changes from blue in basic solution to red in acidic solution.

Delfinidin (pH indicator)
below pH 3		above pH 11
3	⇌	11

== Glycosides ==
Several glycosides derived from delphinidin are known:

- Myrtillin (delphinidin-3-O-glucoside) and tulipanin (delphinidin-3-O-rutinoside) can be found in blackcurrant pomace.
- Violdelphin (delphinidin 3-rutinoside-7-O-(6-O-(4-(6-O-(4-hydroxybenzoyl)-β-D-glucosyl)oxybenzoyl)-β-D-glucoside) is responsible for the purplish-blue flower color of Aconitum chinense.
- Nasunin (delphinidin-3-(p-coumaroylrutinoside)-5-glucoside) is responsible for the colour of the eggplant fruit's purple skin.
- Delphinidin ternatins including Clitoria ternatea ternatins

== See also ==
- Prodelphinidin, a type of condensed tannins
