= Grape =

Fruit growing on woody vines in clusters

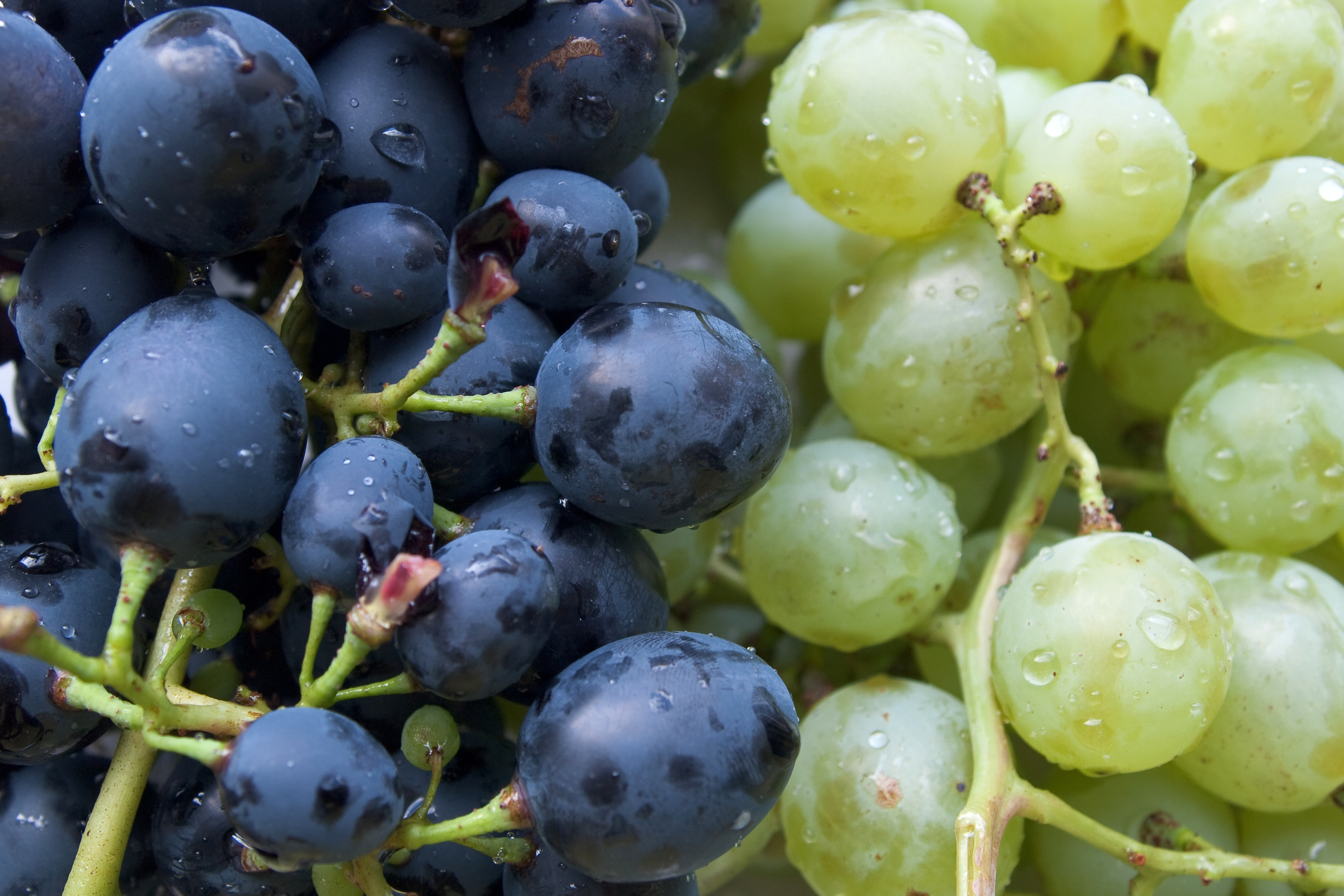
"Black" (dark blue) and "white" (light green) table grapes

A grape is a fruit, botanically a berry, of the deciduous woody vines of the flowering plant genus Vitis. Grapes are a non-climacteric type of fruit, generally occurring in clusters.

The cultivation of grapes began approximately 8,000 years ago, and the fruit has been used as human food throughout history. Eaten fresh or in dried form (as raisins, currants and sultanas), grapes also hold cultural significance in many parts of the world, particularly for their role in winemaking. Other grape-derived products include various types of jam, juice, vinegar and oil.

== History ==
The Middle East is generally described as the homeland of grapes and the cultivation of this plant began there 6,000–8,000 years ago. Yeast, one of the earliest domesticated microorganisms, occurs naturally on the skins of grapes, leading to the discovery of alcoholic drinks such as wine. The earliest archaeological evidence for a dominant position of wine-making in human culture dates from 8,000 years ago in Georgia.

The oldest known winery, the Areni-1 winery, was found in Armenia and dates back to around 4000 BC. By the 9th century AD, the city of Shiraz was known to produce some of the finest wines in the Middle East. Thus it has been proposed that Syrah red wine is named after Shiraz, a city in Persia where the grape was used to make Shirazi wine.

Ancient Egyptian hieroglyphics record the cultivation of purple grapes, and history attests to the ancient Greeks, Cypriots, Phoenicians, and Romans growing purple grapes for eating and wine production. The growing of grapes later spread to other regions in Europe, North and South Africa, North America, South America,Australia and New Zealand.

In 2005, a team of archaeologists concluded that Chalcolithic wine jars discovered in Cyprus in the 1930s dated back to 3500 BC, making them the oldest of their kind in the world. Commandaria, a sweet dessert wine from Cyprus, is the oldest manufactured wine in the world with origins as far back as 2000 BC.

In North America, native grapes belonging to various species of the genus Vitis proliferate in the wild across the continent and were a part of the diet of many Native Americans, but early European colonists considered them to be unsuitable for wine. In the 19th century, Ephraim Bull of Concord, Massachusetts, cultivated seeds from wild Vitis labrusca vines to create the Concord grape, which would become an important agricultural crop in the United States.

Grape production

Grape yield

== Description ==
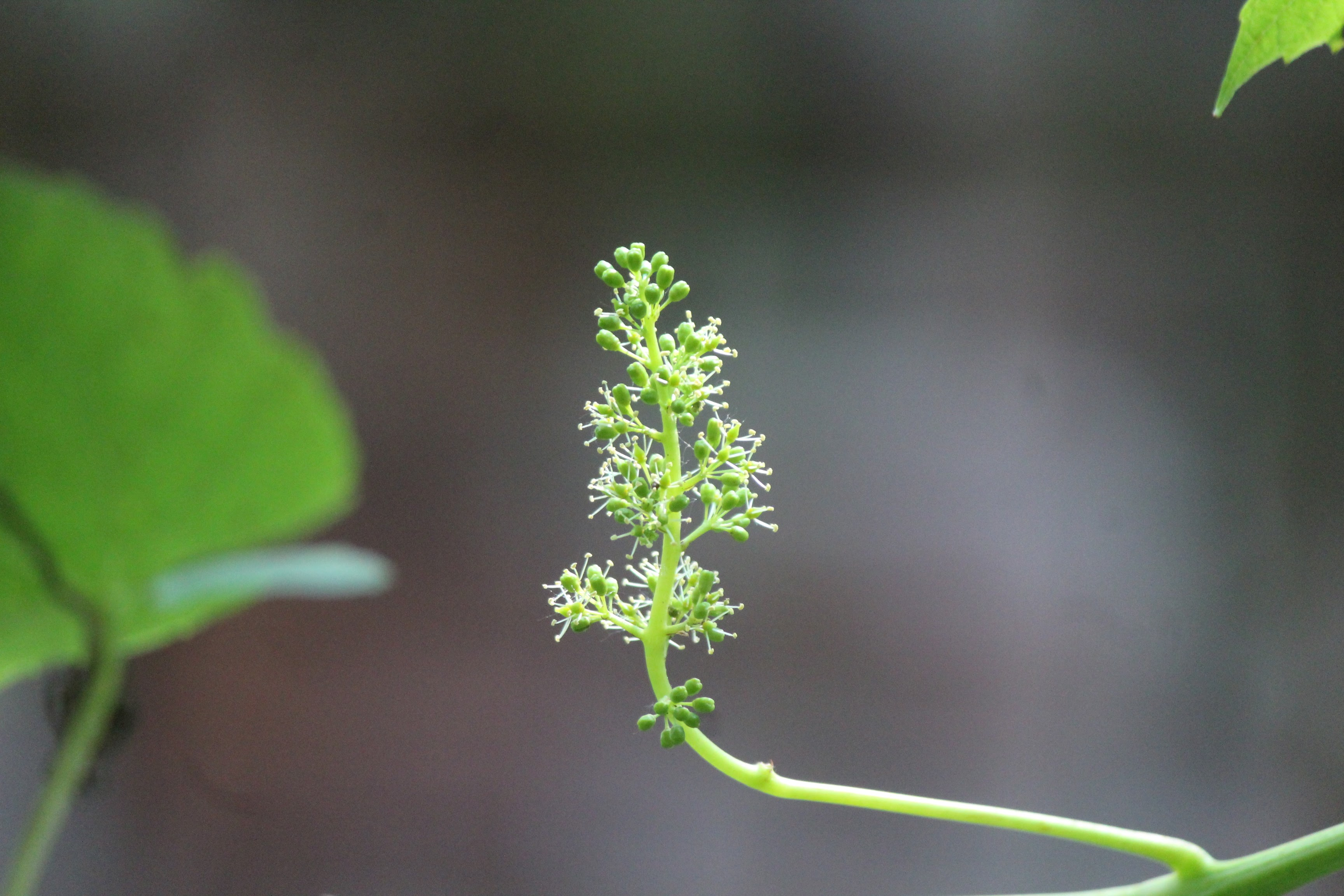
Grape flower buds during flowering period.

Grapes are a type of berry fruit that grow in clusters of 15 to 300. The berries appear within a 60 day period after fertilization first producing tartaric acid, then later malic acid when their flesh increases in reaction to the hormone of ethylene; these acids give slight sour tastes to the berries other than their sweetness. When these young berries reach a ripening stage (called véraison from the French language), the berries change to darker colours, increase in size and produce sugars; this véraison period begins in August taking around about 45 days with normal conditions in the Northern Hemisphere. Ripe grape berries are typically ellipsoid in shape resembling a prolate spheroid. Their flesh has 75-85% water content; the water is obtained from the plant xylem before ripening, the phloem supplies water with soluble sugars glucose and fructose following the ripening stage.

Anthocyanins and other pigment chemicals of the larger family of polyphenols in purple grapes are responsible for the varying shades of purple in the grape berries and red wines they produce. Various grapes ripen can be crimson, black, dark blue, yellow, green, orange, and pink. "White" grapes are actually green in color and are evolutionarily derived from the purple grape. Mutations in two regulatory genes of white grapes turn off production of anthocyanins, which are responsible for the color of purple grapes.

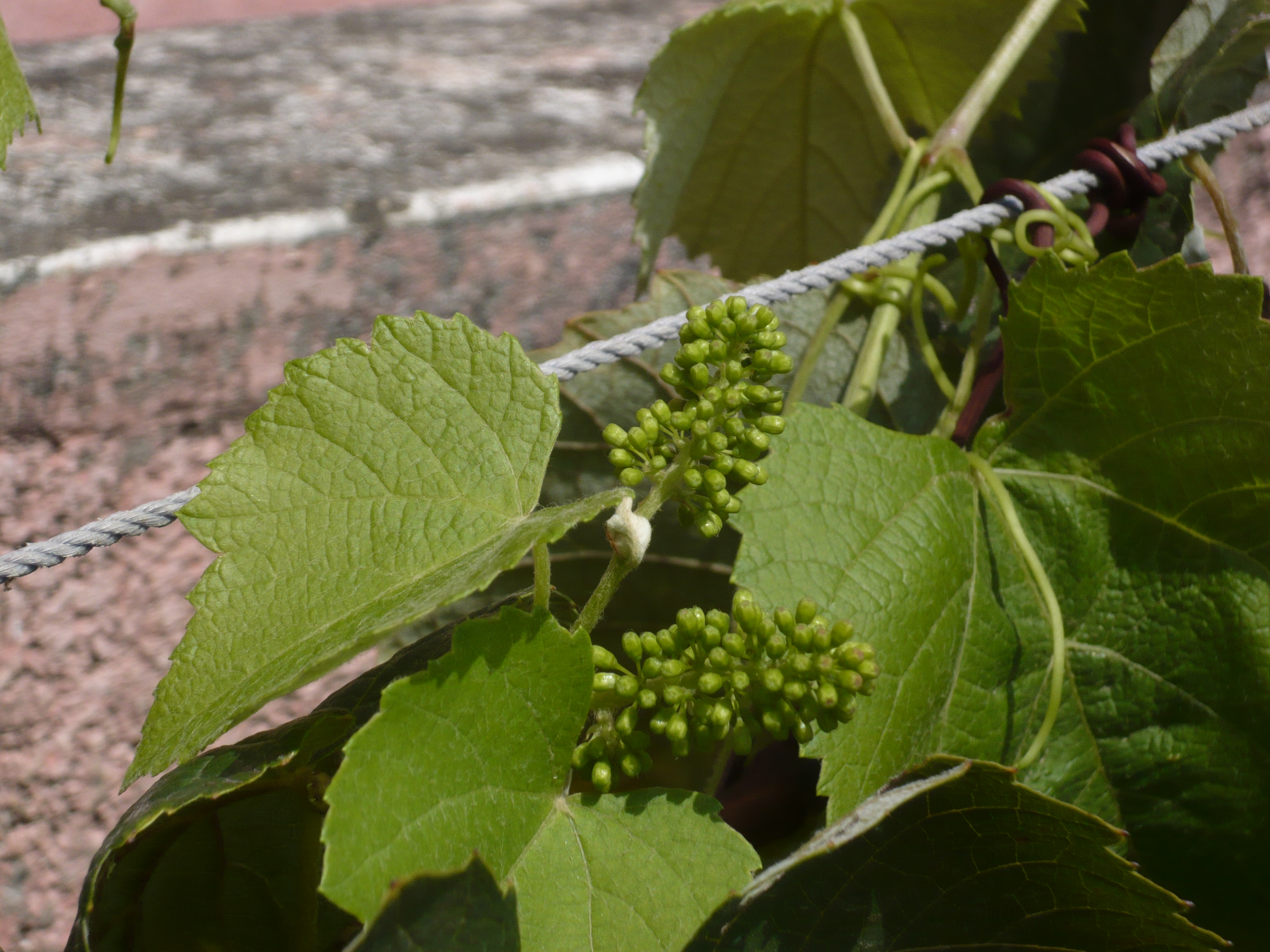
Flower buds

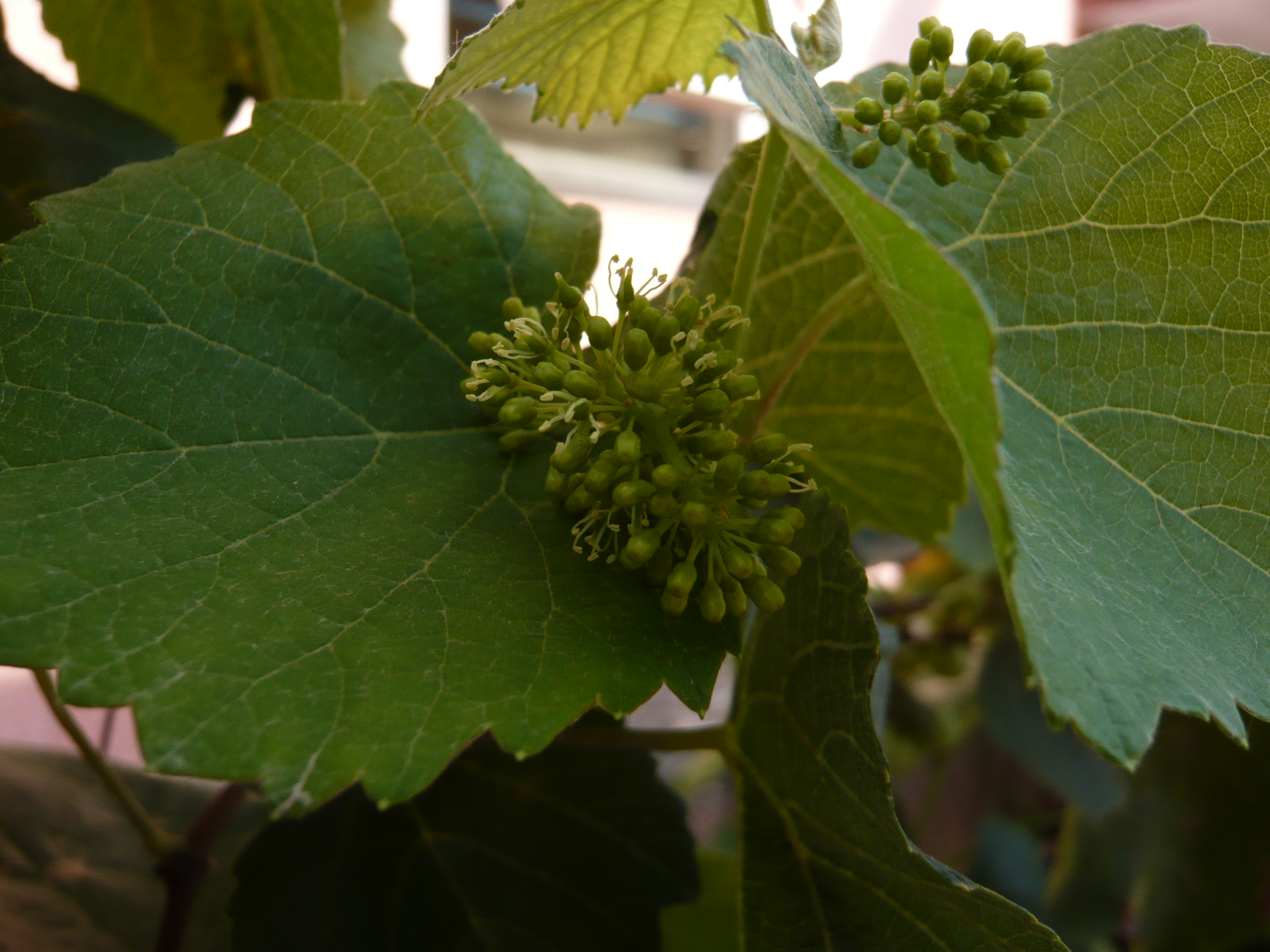
Flowers

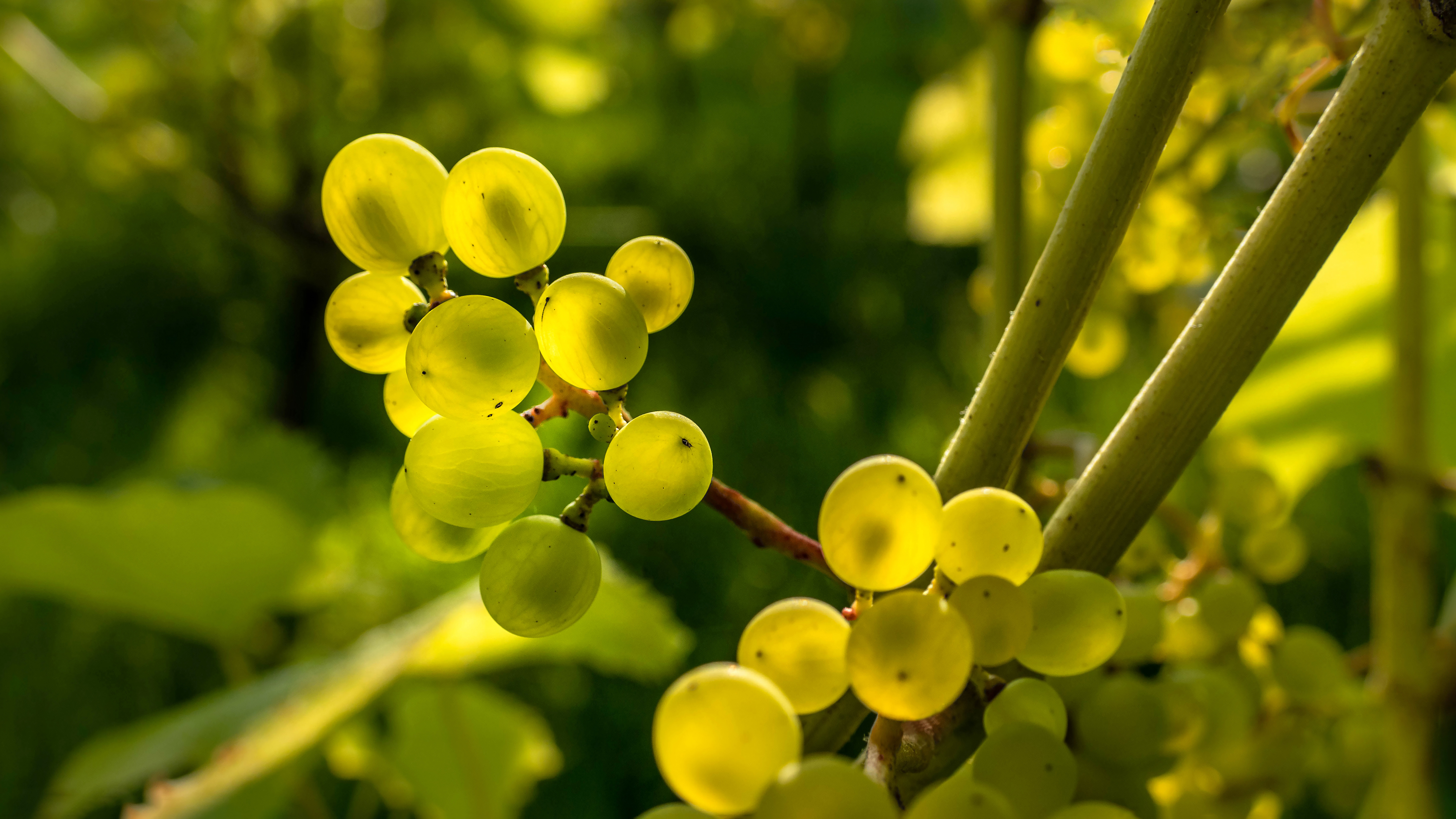
Immature fruit

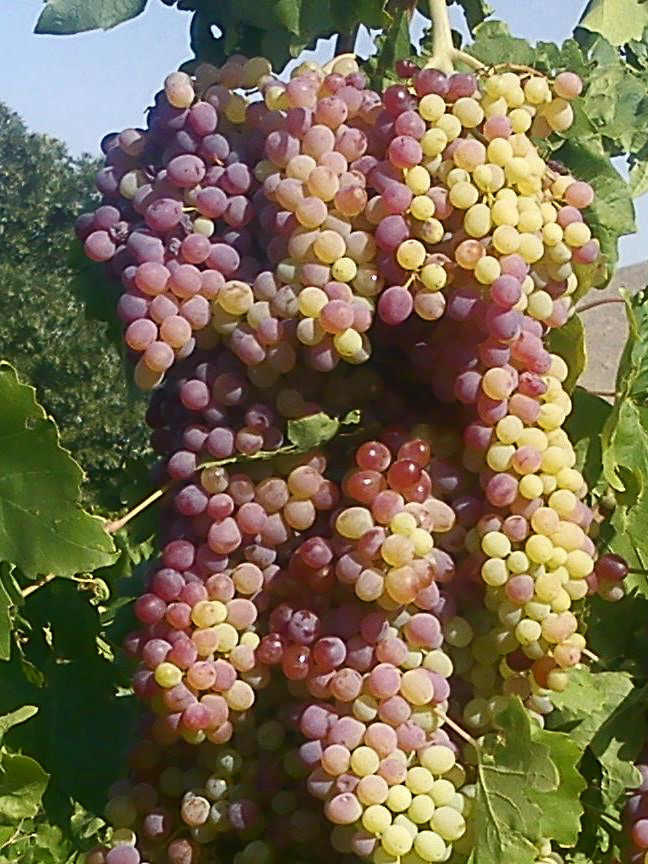
Grapes in Abhar County, Iran

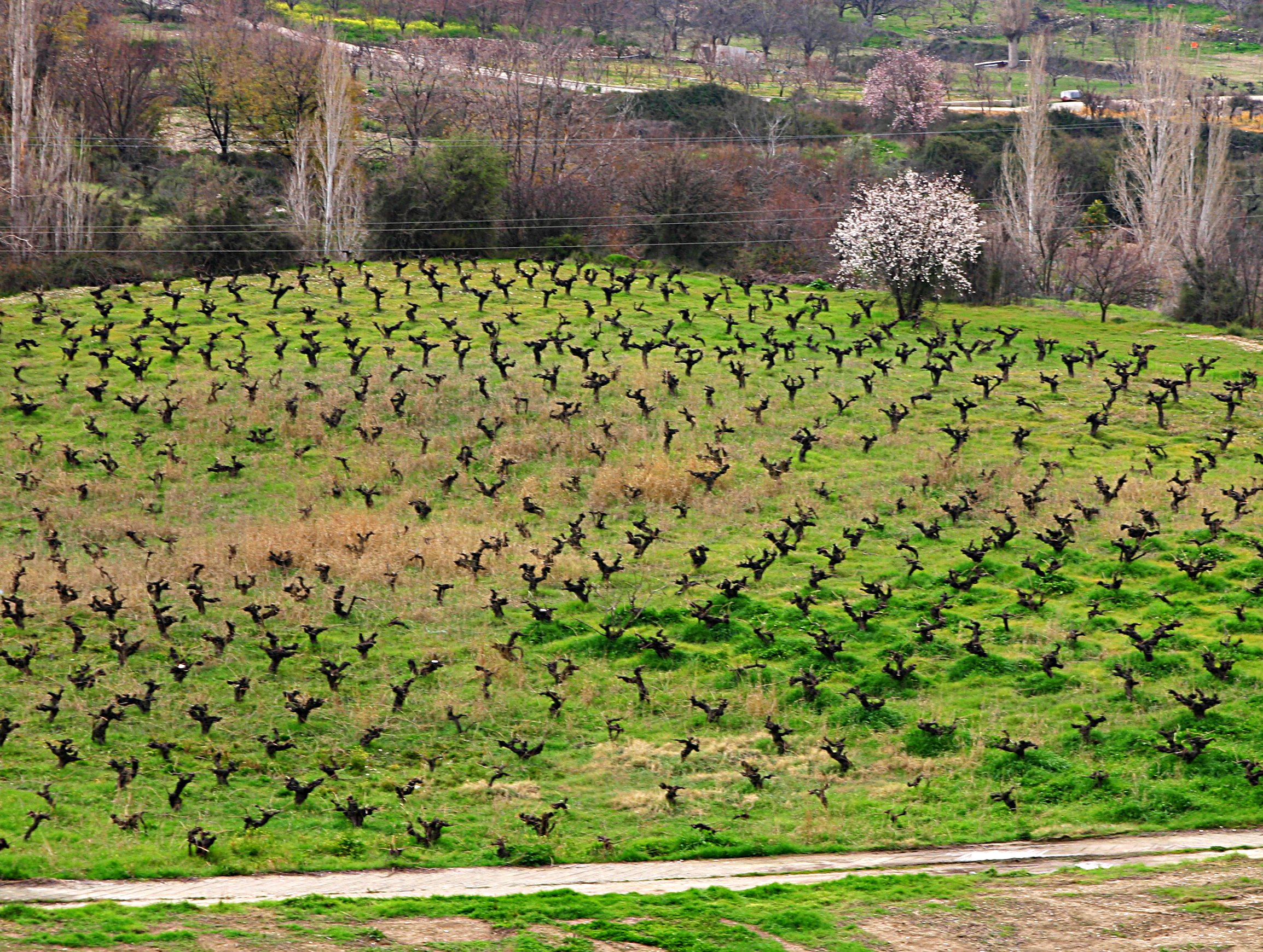
Vineyard in the Troodos Mountains

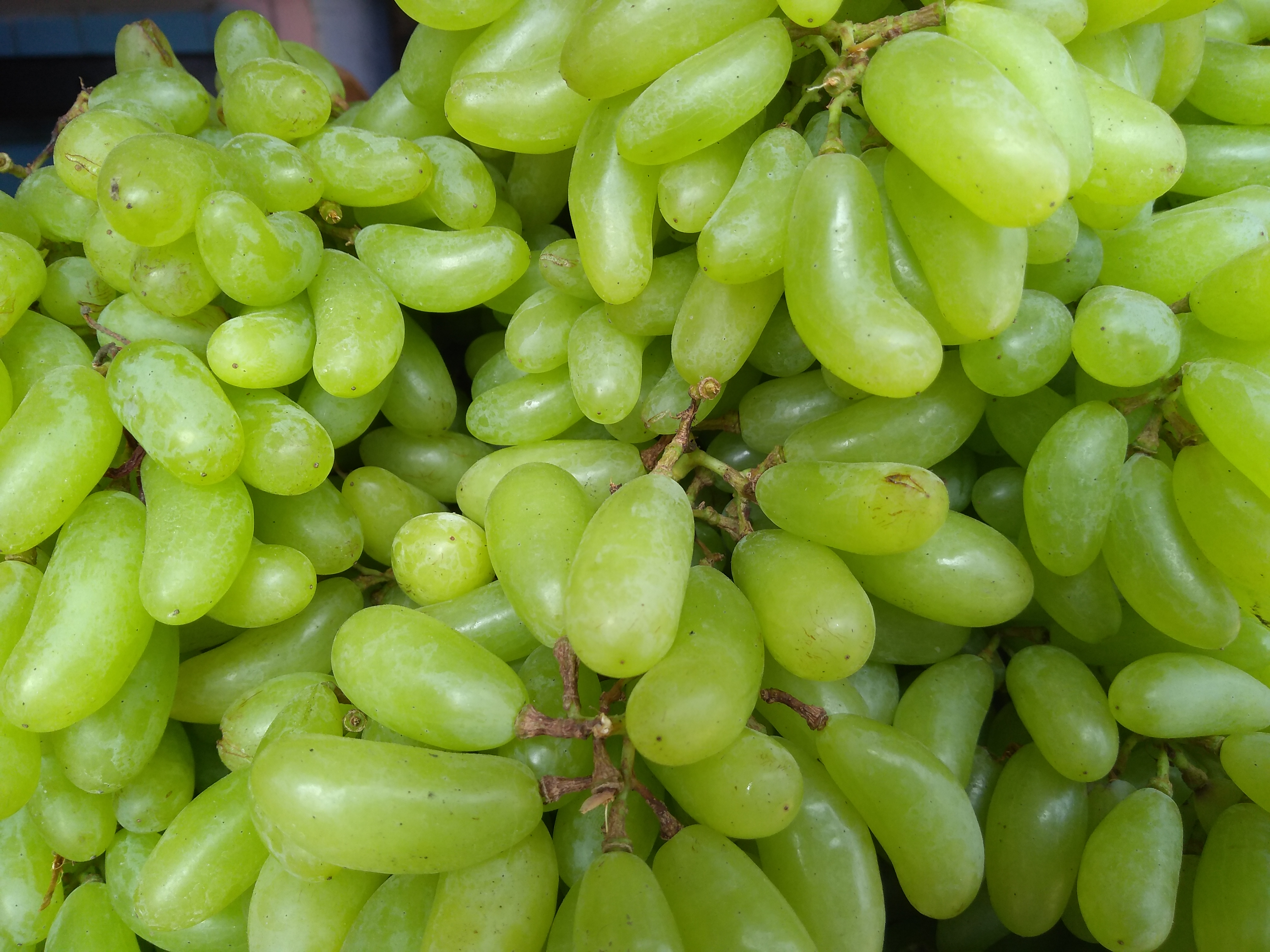
seedless grapes

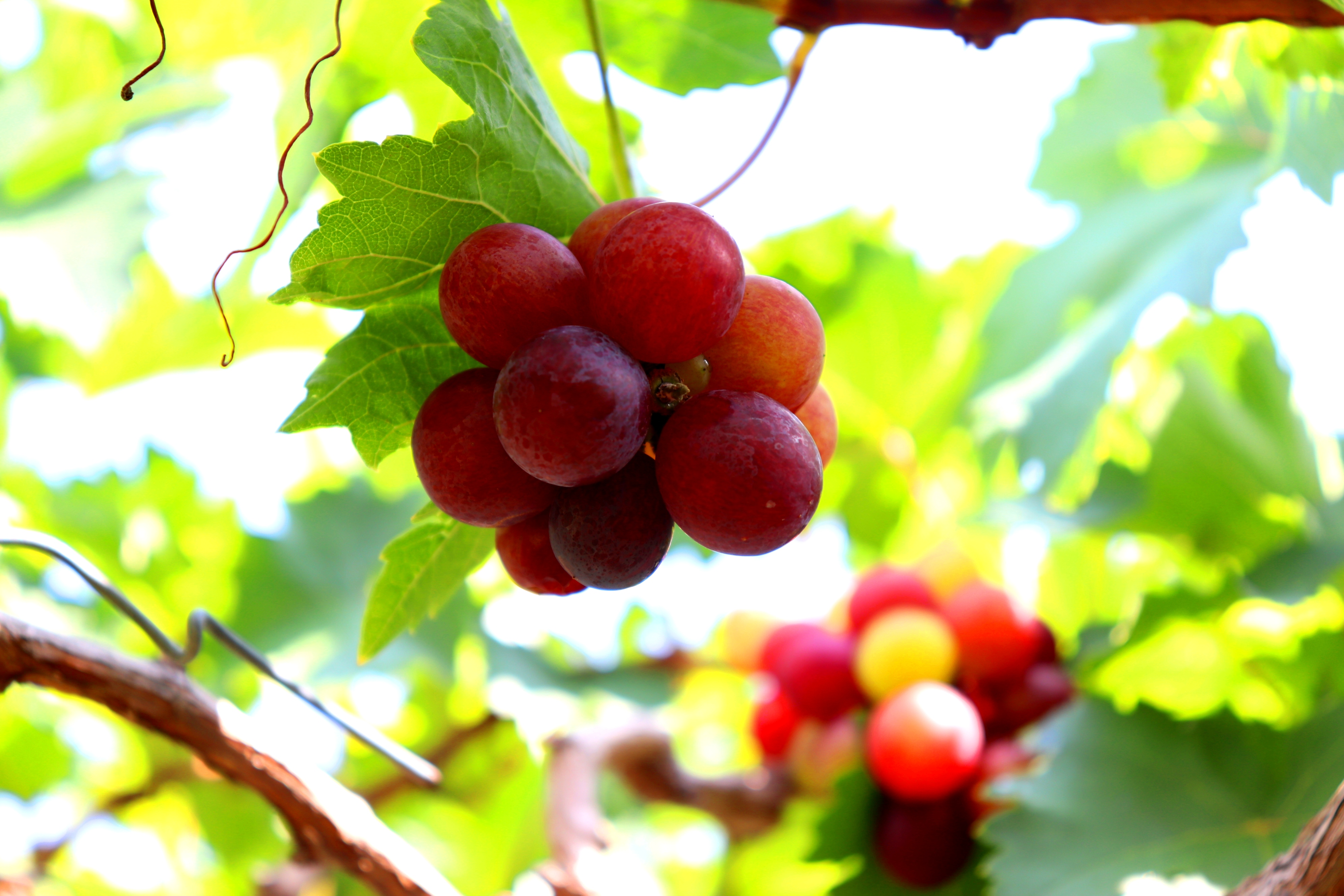
Grapes in the La Union, Philippines

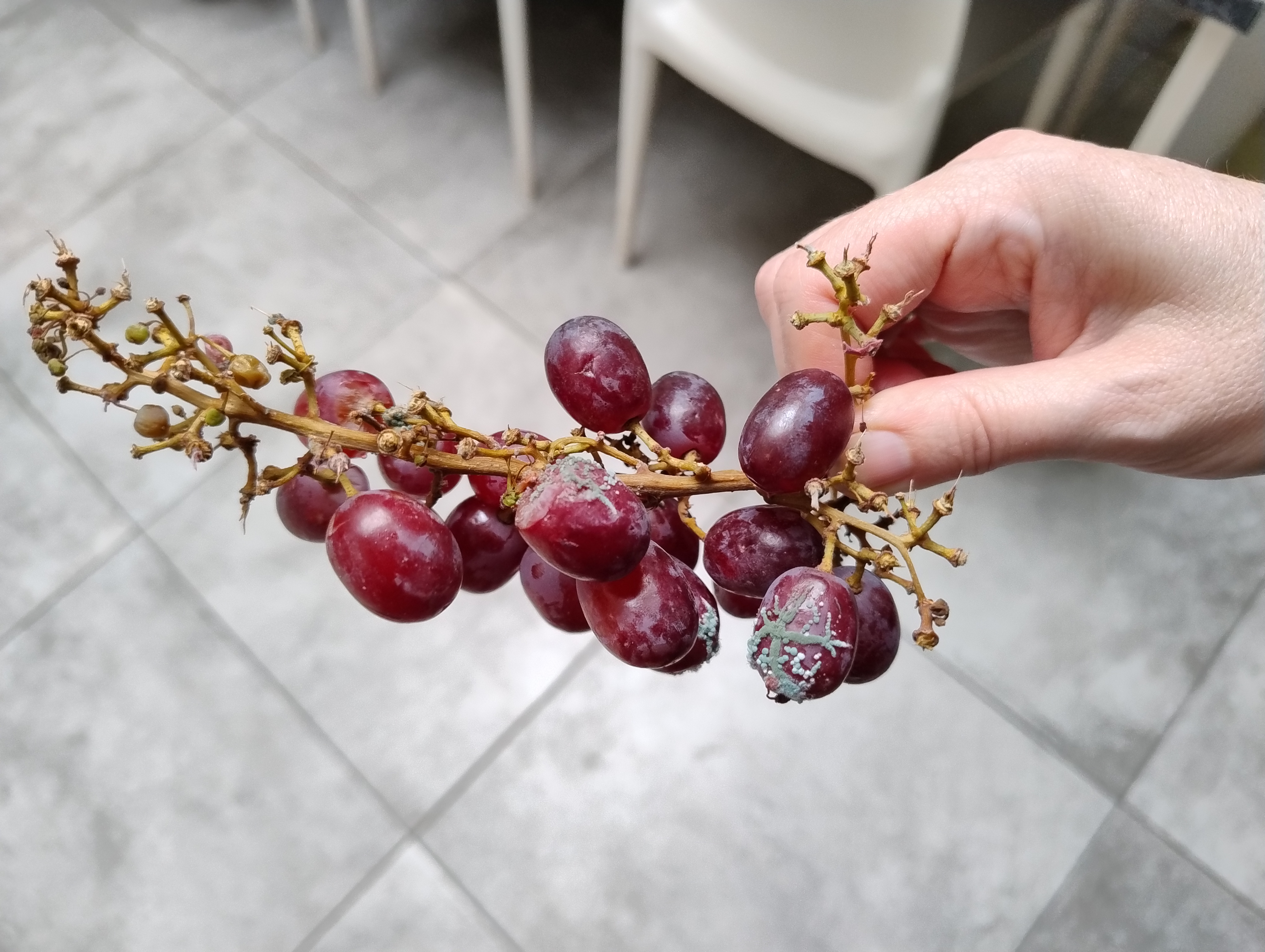
Moldy grapes

== Nutrition ==
Grapes, red or green
Nutritional value per 100 g (3.5 oz)
- Energy: 288 kJ (69 kcal)
- Carbohydrates: 18.1 g
- Sugars: 15.48 g
- Dietary fiber: 0.9 g
- Fat: 0.16 g
- Protein: 0.72 g
Vitamins and minerals
Vitamins	Quantity %DV^{†}
Thiamine (B1)	6% 0.069 mg
Riboflavin (B2)	5% 0.07 mg
Niacin (B3)	1% 0.188 mg
Pantothenic acid (B5)	1% 0.05 mg
Vitamin B6	5% 0.086 mg
Folate (B9)	1% 2 μg
Choline	1% 5.6 mg
Vitamin C	4% 3.2 mg
Vitamin E	1% 0.19 mg
Vitamin K	12% 14.6 μg
Minerals	Quantity %DV^{†}
Calcium	1% 10 mg
Iron	2% 0.36 mg
Magnesium	2% 7 mg
Manganese	3% 0.071 mg
Phosphorus	2% 20 mg
Potassium	6% 191 mg
Sodium	0% 2 mg
Zinc	1% 0.07 mg
- Other constituents: Quantity
- Water: 81 g
- Link to USDA Database entry
- ^{†}Percentages estimated using US recommendations for adults, except for potassium, which is estimated based on expert recommendation from the National Academies.

Raw grapes are 81% water, 18% carbohydrates, 1% protein, and have negligible fat (table). A 100-gram (3 1/2-ounce) reference amount of raw grapes supplies 288 kilojoules (69 kilocalories) of food energy and a moderate amount of vitamin K (12% of the Daily Value), with no other micronutrients in significant amounts (table).

== Grapevines ==
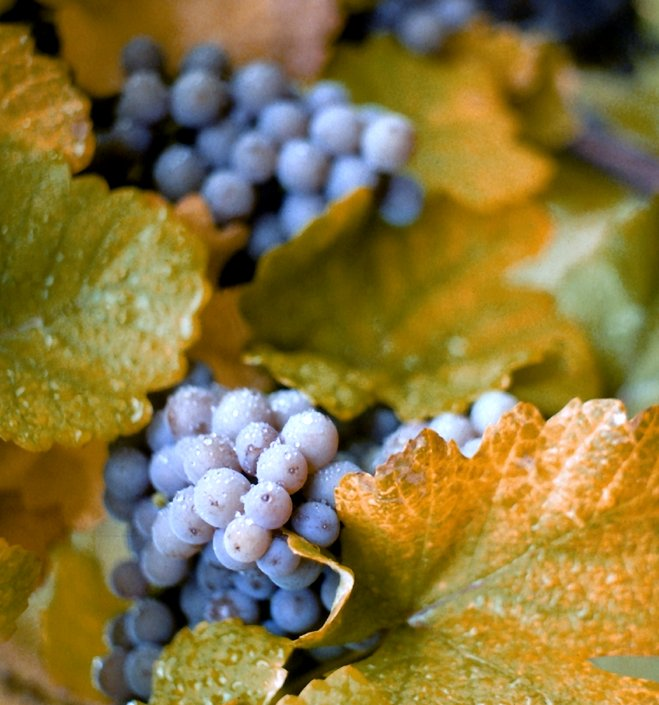
Concord is a variety of North American labrusca grape

Most domesticated grapes come from cultivars of Vitis vinifera, a grapevine native to the Mediterranean and Central Asia. Minor amounts of fruit and wine come from American and Asian species such as:

- Vitis amurensis, the most important Asian species
- Vitis labrusca, the North American table and grape juice grapevines (including the Concord cultivar), sometimes used for wine, are native to the Eastern United States and Canada.
- Vitis mustangensis (the mustang grape), found in Mississippi, Alabama, Louisiana, Texas, and Oklahoma
- Vitis riparia, a wild vine of North America, is sometimes used for winemaking and jam. It is native to the entire Eastern United States and north to Quebec.
- Vitis rotundifolia (the muscadine), used for jams and wine, is native to the Southeastern United States from Delaware to the Gulf of Mexico.

Grape production 2023, millions of tonnes
China	13.5
Italy	6.7
France	6.2
United States	5.4
Spain	4.8
Turkey	3.4
Chile	2.3
World	72.5
Source: FAOSTAT of the United Nations

== Distribution of agriculture ==
In 2023, the world total of land dedicated to grape growing (in hectares, ha) was 6,595,680 ha (16,298,300 acres). By country dedicating farmland for grape growing in 2023, Spain had 913,000 ha (2,260,000 acres), France 753,340 ha (1,861,500 acres), Italy 713,350 ha (1,762,700 acres), and China 607,030 ha (1,500,000 acres). Approximately 71% of world grape production is used for wine, 27% as fresh fruit, and 2% as dried fruit.

There are no reliable statistics that break down grape production by variety. It is believed that the most widely planted variety is Sultana, also known as Thompson Seedless, with at least 3,600 km^{2} (880,000 acres) dedicated to it. The second most common variety is Airén. Other popular varieties include Cabernet Sauvignon, Sauvignon blanc, Cabernet Franc, Merlot, Grenache, Tempranillo, Riesling, and Chardonnay.

== Production ==
In 2023, world production of grapes was 72.5 million tonnes, led by China with 19% of the total, with Italy and France as major secondary producers (table).

Grape exports 2023, tonnes
Peru	647,967
Chile	529,470
China	483,373
Italy	386,672
Netherlands	346,128
South Africa	318,126
Source: FAOSTAT of the United Nations

== Exports ==
In 2023, the leading exporters of grapes were Peru and Chile, each with more than half a million tonnes (table).

== Table and wine grapes ==
Commercially cultivated grapes can usually be classified as either table or wine grapes, based on their intended method of consumption: eaten raw (table grapes) or used to make wine (wine grapes). The sweetness of grapes depends on when they are harvested, as they do not continue to ripen once picked. While almost all belong to the same species, Vitis vinifera, table and wine grapes have significant differences, brought about through selective breeding. Table grape cultivars tend to have large, seedless fruit (see below) with relatively thin skin. Wine grapes are smaller, usually seeded, and have relatively thick skins (a desirable characteristic in winemaking, since much of the aroma in wine comes from the skin).

Grapes accumulate sugars as they grow on the grapevine through the transportation of sucrose molecules that are produced by photosynthesis from the leaves. During ripening the sucrose molecules are hydrolyzed (separated) into glucose and fructose. Wine grapes tend to be very sweet: they are harvested at the time when their juice is approximately 24% sugar by weight. By comparison, commercially produced "100% grape juice", made from table grapes, is usually around 15% sugar by weight.

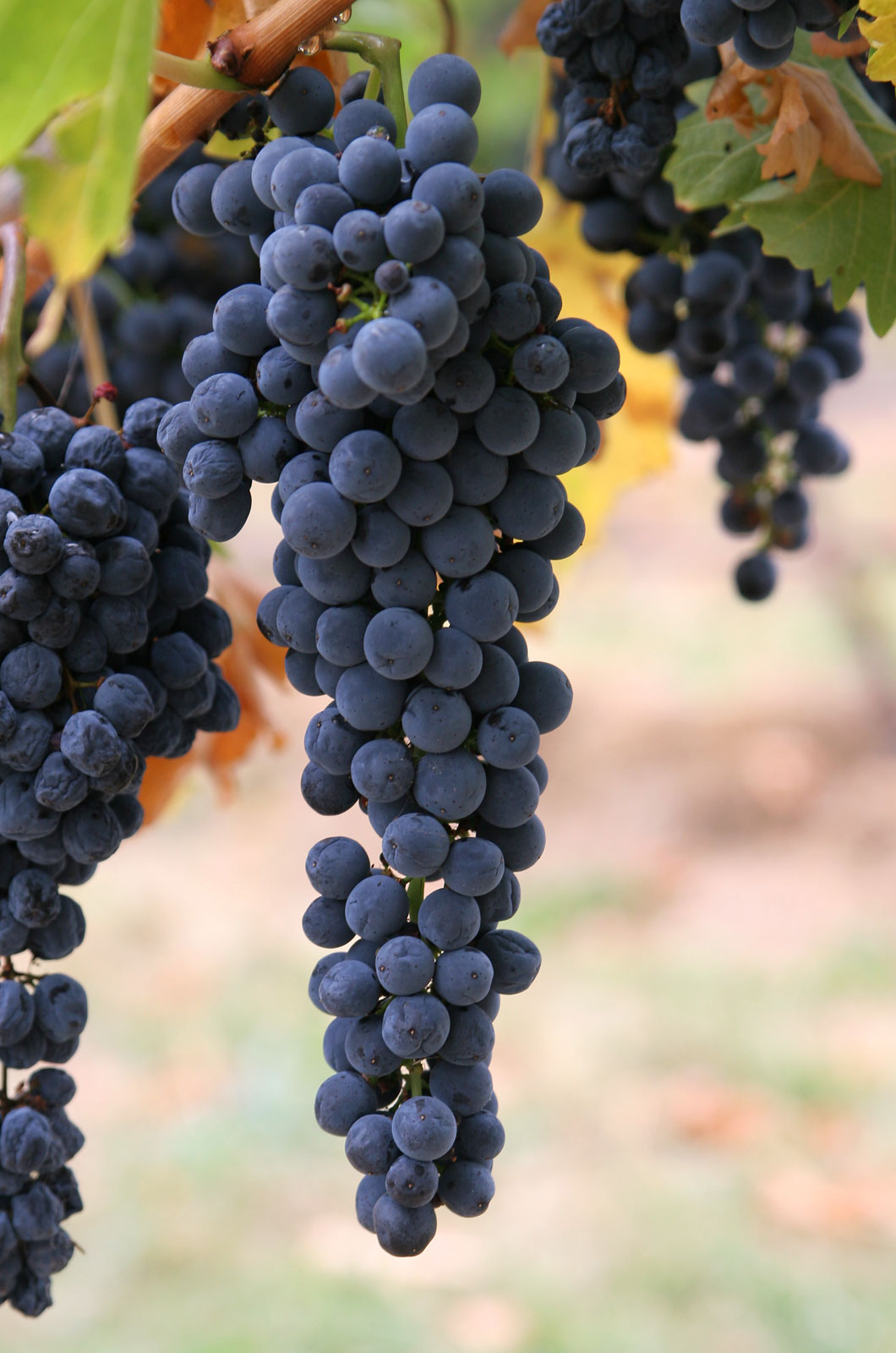
Wine grapes on the vine

== Seedless grapes ==
Seedless cultivars now make up the overwhelming majority of table grape plantings. Because grapevines are vegetatively propagated by cuttings, the lack of seeds does not present a problem for reproduction. It is an issue for breeders, who must either use a seeded variety as the female parent or rescue embryos early in development using tissue culture techniques.

There are several sources of the seedlessness trait, and essentially all commercial cultivators get it from one of three sources: Thompson Seedless, Russian Seedless, and Black Monukka, all being cultivars of Vitis vinifera. There are currently more than a dozen varieties of seedless grapes. Several, such as Einset Seedless, Benjamin Gunnels's Prime seedless grapes, Reliance, and Venus, have been specifically cultivated for hardiness and quality in the relatively cold climates of northeastern United States and southern Ontario.

An offset to the improved eating quality of seedlessness is the loss of potential health benefits provided by the enriched phytochemical content of grape seeds.

== Uses ==
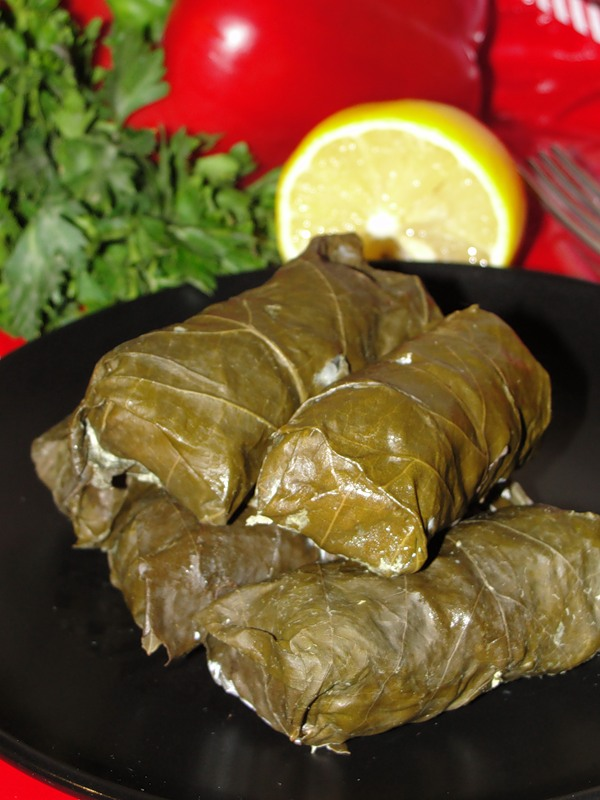
Grape leaves in cuisine (dolma)

=== Food ===
Grapes are eaten raw, dried (as raisins, currants and sultanas), or cooked. Also, depending on the grape cultivar, grapes are used in winemaking. Grapes can be processed into a multitude of products such as jams, juices, vinegars and oils. Commercially cultivated grapes are classified as either table or wine grapes. These categories are based on their intended method of consumption: grapes that are eaten raw (table grapes), or grapes that are used to make wine (wine grapes). Table grape cultivars normally have large, seedless fruit and thin skins. Wine grapes are smaller (in comparison to table grapes), usually contain seeds, and have thicker skins (a desirable characteristic in making wine). Most of the aroma in wine is from the skin. Wine grapes tend to have a high sugar content. They are harvested at peak sugar levels (approximately 24% sugar by weight.) In comparison, commercially produced "100% grape juice" made from table grapes are normally around 15% sugar by weight.

==== Raisins, currants and sultanas ====
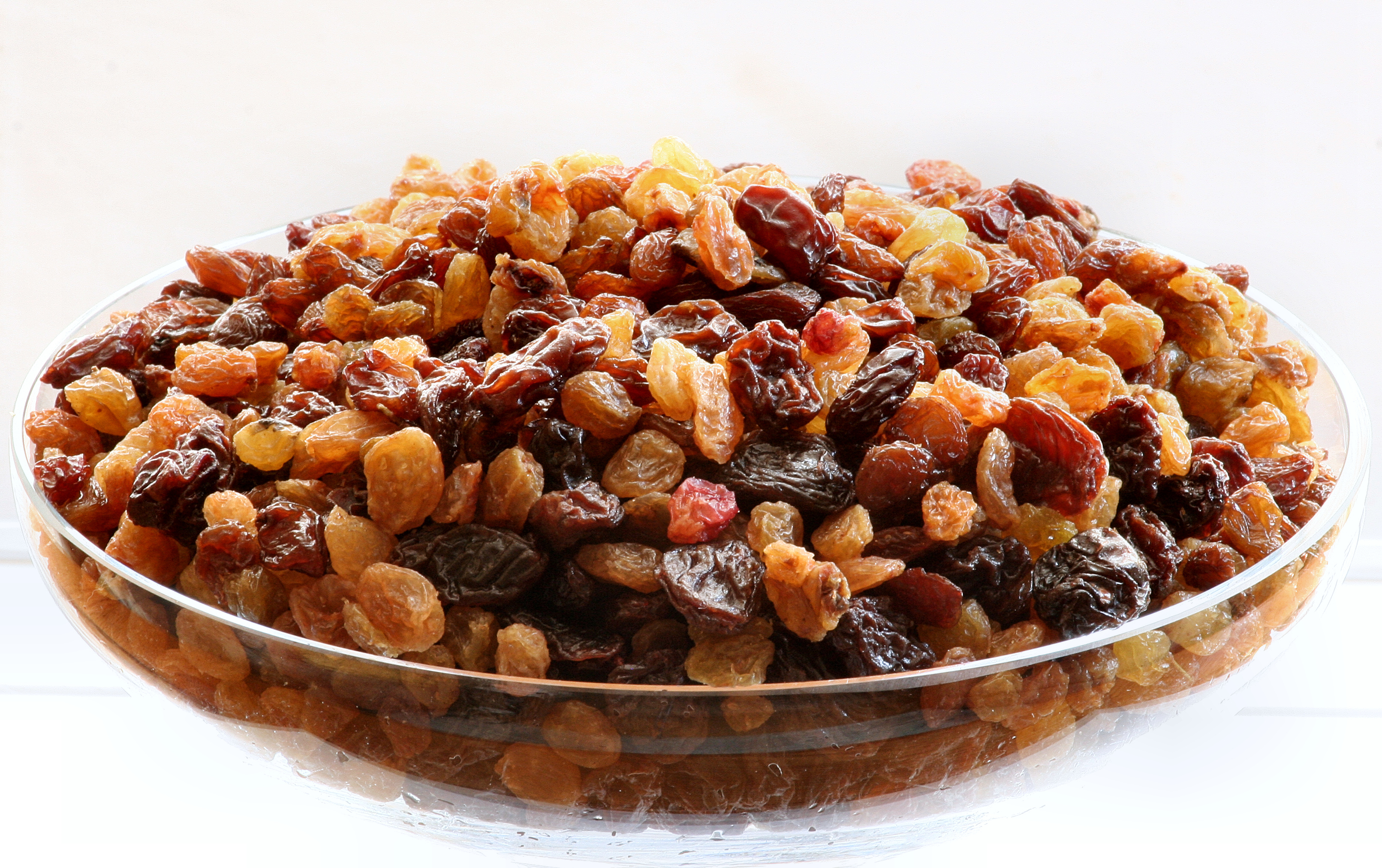
Raisins

In most of Europe and North America, dried grapes are referred to as raisins or the local equivalent. In Britain and Ireland, three different varieties are recognized, forcing the EU to use the term "dried vine fruit" in official documents.

A raisin is any dried grape. While raisin is a French loanword, the word in French refers to the fresh fruit; grappe (from which the English grape is derived) refers to the bunch (as in une grappe de raisins). A raisin in French is called raisin sec ('dry grape').

A currant is a dried Zante Black Corinth grape, the name being a corruption of the French raisin de Corinthe (Corinth grape). The names of the black and red currant, now more usually blackcurrant and redcurrant, two berries unrelated to grapes, are derived from this use. Some other fruits of similar appearance are also so named, for example, Australian currant, native currant, Indian currant.

A sultana was originally a raisin made from Sultana grapes of Turkish origin (known as Thompson Seedless in the United States), but the word is now applied to raisins made from either white grapes or red grapes that are bleached to resemble the traditional sultana.

==== Juice ====
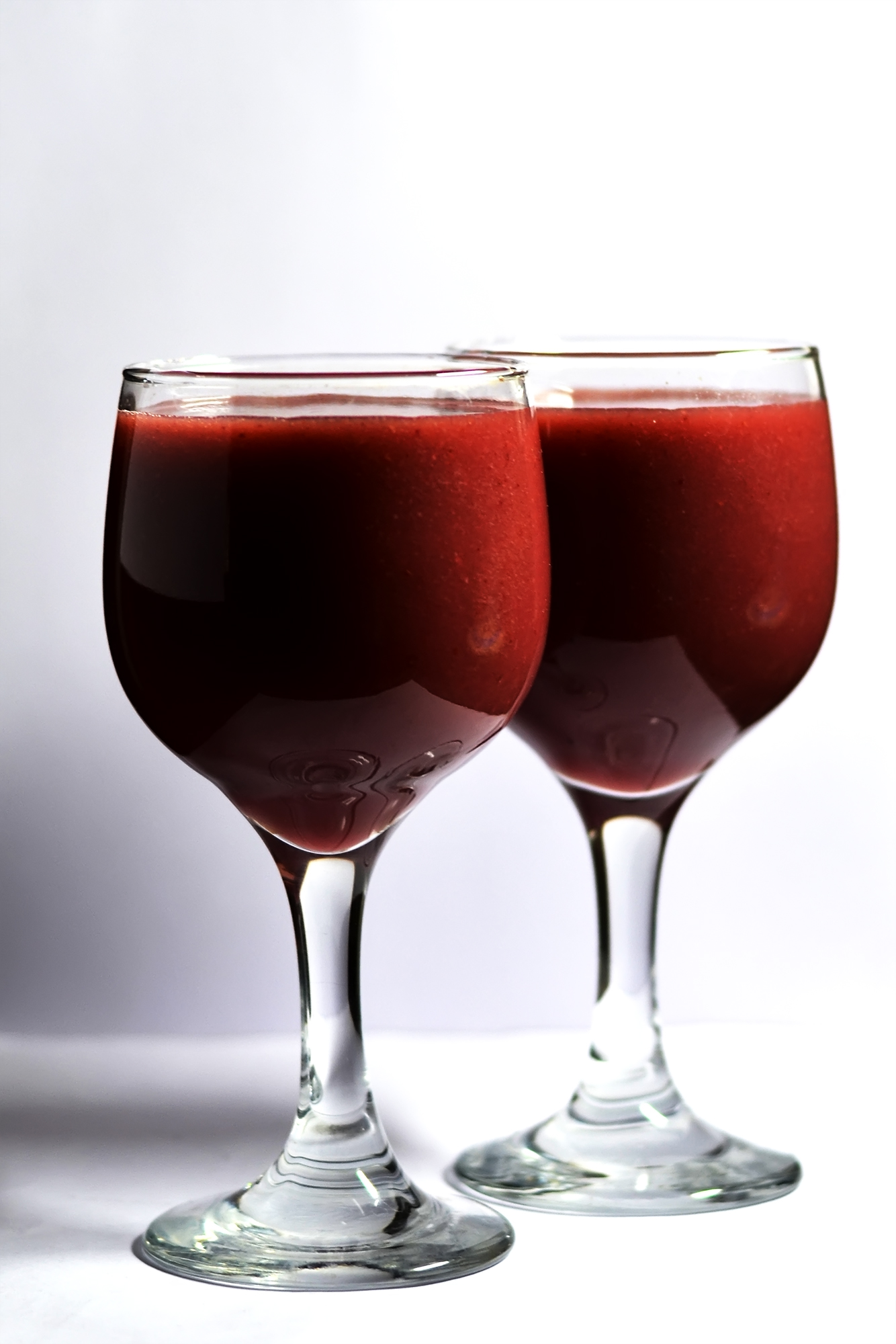
Grape juice

Grape juice is obtained from crushing and blending grapes into a liquid. The juice is often sold in stores or fermented and made into wine, brandy, or vinegar. Grape juice that has been pasteurized, removing any naturally occurring yeast, will not ferment if kept sterile, and thus contains no alcohol. In the wine industry, grape juice that contains 7–23% of pulp, skins, stems and seeds is often referred to as "must".

In North America, the most common grape juice is purple and made from Concord grapes, while white grape juice is commonly made from Niagara grapes, both of which are varieties of native American grapes, a different species from European wine grapes. In California, Sultana (known there as Thompson Seedless) grapes are sometimes diverted from the raisin or table market to produce white juice.

==== Vinegars ====
Husrum, also known as verjuice, is a type of vinegar made from sour grapes in the Middle East. It is produced by crushing unripened grapes, collecting and salting the juice, simmering it to remove foam, and then storing it with a layer of olive oil to prevent contamination and oxidation. It is then used as an acidic ingredient in salads and stuffed vegetables. Unripened husrum grapes sent from Ashkelon to Egypt are mentioned in a 12th-century document found in the Cairo Geniza. In Iran, a sour grape vinegar is used for making Shirazi salad.

== Pomace and phytochemicals ==
Winemaking from red and white grape flesh and skins produces substantial quantities of organic residues, collectively called pomace (also "marc"), which includes crushed skins, seeds, stems, and leaves generally used as compost. Grape pomace – some 10–30% of the total mass of grapes crushed – contains various phytochemicals, such as unfermented sugars, alcohol, polyphenols, tannins, anthocyanins, and numerous other compounds, some of which are harvested and extracted for commercial applications (a process sometimes called "valorization" of the pomace).

=== Skin ===
Grape cross-section

Anthocyanins tend to be the main polyphenolics in purple grapes, whereas flavan-3-ols (i.e. catechins) are the more abundant class of polyphenols in white varieties. Total phenolic content is higher in purple varieties due almost entirely to anthocyanin density in purple grape skin compared to absence of anthocyanins in white grape skin. Phenolic content of grape skin varies with cultivar, soil composition, climate, geographic origin, and cultivation practices or exposure to diseases, such as fungal infections.

Muscadine grapes contain a relatively high phenolic content among dark grapes. In muscadine skins, ellagic acid, myricetin, quercetin, kaempferol, and trans-resveratrol are major phenolics.

The flavonols syringetin, syringetin 3-O-galactoside, laricitrin and laricitrin 3-O-galactoside are also found in purple grape but absent in white grape.

=== Seeds ===
Muscadine grape seeds contain about twice the total polyphenol content of skins. Grape seed oil from crushed seeds is used in cosmeceuticals and skincare products. Grape seed oil, including tocopherols (vitamin E) and high contents of phytosterols and polyunsaturated fatty acids such as linoleic acid, oleic acid, and alpha-linolenic acid.

=== Resveratrol ===
Resveratrol, a stilbene compound, is found in widely varying amounts among grape varieties, primarily in their skins and seeds. Muscadine grapes have about one hundred times higher concentration of stilbenes than pulp. Fresh grape skin contains about 50 to 100 micrograms of resveratrol per gram.

=== Grape and raisin toxicity in dogs ===
The consumption of grapes and raisins presents a potential health threat to dogs. Their toxicity to dogs can cause the animal to develop acute kidney failure (the sudden development of kidney failure) with anuria (a lack of urine production) and may be fatal.

== See also ==
- Seven species
- Annual growth cycle of grapevines
- Drakshasava, a traditional Ayurvedic tonic made from grapes
- Grape syrup
- List of grape dishes
- List of grape varieties
- Menispermum canadense, a poisonous species resembling wild grapes
- Propagation of grapevines
- The Fox and the Grapes
