= Hill reaction =

Chemical reaction

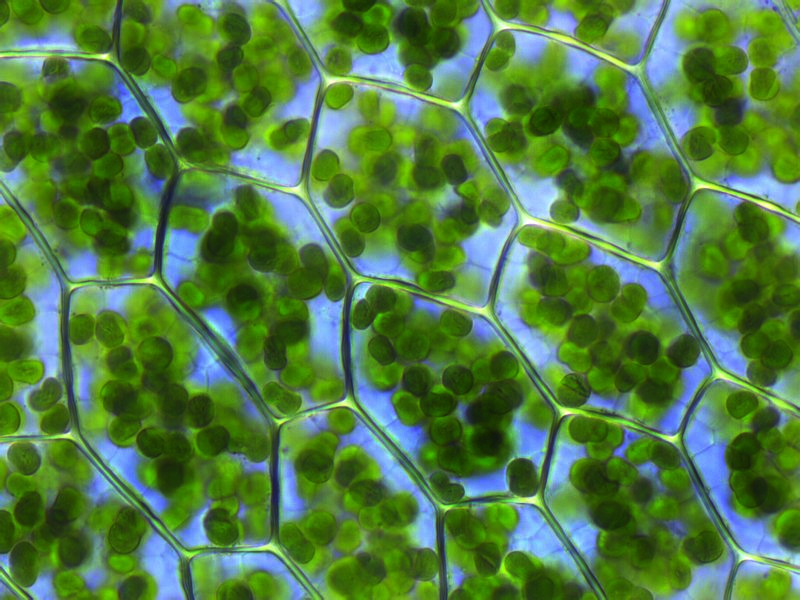
Plant cells with visible chloroplasts (from a moss, Plagiomnium affine)

The Hill reaction is the light-driven transfer of electrons from water to Hill reagents (non-physiological oxidants) in a direction against the chemical potential gradient as part of photosynthesis. Robin Hill discovered the reaction in 1937. He demonstrated that the process by which plants produce oxygen is separate from the process that converts carbon dioxide to sugars.

== History ==
The evolution of oxygen during the light-dependent steps in photosynthesis (Hill reaction) was proposed and proven by British biochemist Robin Hill. He demonstrated that isolated chloroplasts would make oxygen (O_{2}) but not fix carbon dioxide (CO_{2}). This is evidence that the light and dark reactions occur at different sites within the cell.

Hill's finding was that the origin of oxygen in photosynthesis is water (H_{2}O) not carbon dioxide (CO_{2}) as previously believed. Hill's observation of chloroplasts in dark conditions and in the absence of CO_{2}, showed that the artificial electron acceptor was oxidized but not reduced, terminating the process, but without production of oxygen and sugar. This observation allowed Hill to conclude that oxygen is released during the light-dependent steps (Hill reaction) of photosynthesis.

Hill also discovered Hill reagents, artificial electron acceptors that participate in the light reaction, such as Dichlorophenolindophenol (DCPIP), a dye that changes color when reduced. These dyes permitted the finding of electron transport chains during photosynthesis.

Further studies of the Hill reaction were made in 1957 by plant physiologist Daniel I. Arnon. Arnon studied the Hill reaction using a natural electron acceptor, NADP. He demonstrated the light-independent reaction, observing the reaction under dark conditions with an abundance of carbon dioxide. He found that carbon fixation was independent of light. Arnon effectively separated the light-dependent reaction, which produces ATP, NADPH, H^{+} and oxygen, from the light-independent reaction that produces sugars.

== Biochemistry ==
Noncyclic photophosphorylation through light-dependent reactions of photosynthesis at the thylakoid membrane

Photosynthesis is the process in which light energy is absorbed and converted to chemical energy. This chemical energy is eventually used in the conversion of carbon dioxide to sugar in plants.

=== Natural electron acceptor ===
During photosynthesis, natural electron acceptor NADP is reduced to NADPH in chloroplasts. The following equilibrium reaction takes place.

A reduction reaction that stores energy as NADPH:

$\ce{NADP+ + 2H+ + 2e- -> NADPH + H+}$ (Reduction)

An oxidation reaction as NADPH's energy is used elsewhere:

$\ce{NADPH - 2H+ <- NADPH + H+}$ (Oxidation)

Ferredoxin, also known as an NADP+ reductase, is an enzyme that catalyzes the reduction reaction. It is easy to oxidize NADPH but difficult to reduce NADP^{+}, hence a catalyst is beneficial. Cytochromes are conjugate proteins that contain a haem group. The iron atom from this group undergoes redox reactions:

$\mathrm{Fe^{3+} + e^- \longrightarrow Fe^{2+}}$ (Reduction)

$\mathrm{Fe^{3+} + e^- \longleftarrow Fe^{2+}}$ (Oxidation)

The light-dependent redox reaction takes place before the light-independent reaction in photosynthesis.

=== Chloroplasts in vitro ===
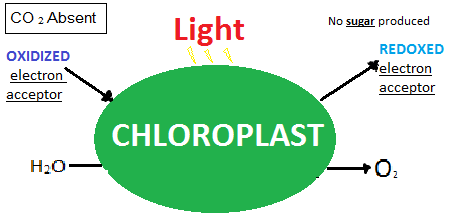
A diagram of the Hill reaction which shows with the usage of an artificial electron acceptor such as DCPIP, and the chloroplast is subjected to light there is a release of oxygen, Also with the absence of CO_{2} there is no sugar production

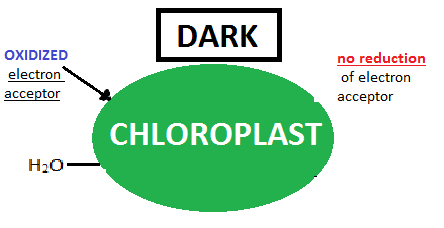
A diagram of the Hill reaction taking place under dark conditions there is no oxygen emitted and the no reduction of the electron acceptors occur

Isolated chloroplasts placed under light conditions but in the absence of CO_{2}, reduce and then oxidize artificial electron acceptors, allowing the process to proceed. Oxygen (O_{2}) is released as a byproduct, but not sugar (CH_{2}O).

Chloroplasts placed under dark conditions and in the absence of CO_{2}, oxidize the artificial acceptor but do not reduce it, terminating the process, without production of oxygen or sugar.

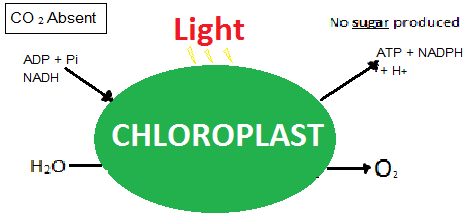
A diagram of the hill reaction under light conditions and the use of a natural electron acceptor

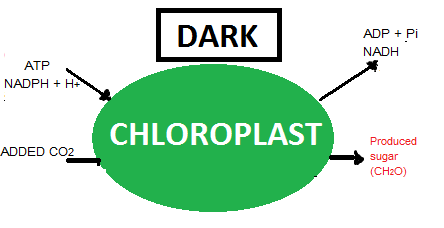
A diagram of the light-independent reaction as found by Arnon(1954) which shows the formation of sugar without the presence of light

=== Relation to phosphorylation ===
The association of phosphorylation and the reduction of an electron acceptor such as ferricyanide increase similarly with the addition of phosphate, magnesium (Mg), and ADP. The existence of these three components is important for maximal reductive and phosphorylative activity. Similar increases in the rate of ferricyanide reduction can be stimulated by a dilution technique. Dilution does not cause a further increase in the rate in which ferricyanide is reduced with the accumulation of ADP, phosphate, and Mg to a treated chloroplast suspension. ATP inhibits the rate of ferricyanide reduction. Studies of light intensities revealed that the effect was largely on the light-independent steps of the Hill reaction. These observations are explained in terms of a proposed method in which phosphate esterifies during electron transport reactions, reducing ferricyanide, while the rate of electron transport is limited by the rate of phosphorylation. An increase in the rate of phosphorylation increases the rate by which electrons are transported in the electron transport system.

== Hill reagent ==
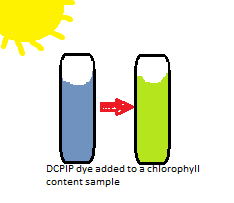
The addition of DCPIP experimentally to a chlorophyll molecule containing solution which shows a change in color due to the reduction of DCPIP

It is possible to introduce an artificial electron acceptor into the light reaction, such as a dye that changes color when it is reduced. These are known as Hill reagents. These dyes permitted the finding of electron transport chains during photosynthesis. Dichlorophenolindophenol (DCPIP), an example of these dyes, is widely used by experimenters. DCPIP is a dark blue solution that becomes lighter as it is reduced. It provides experimenters with a simple visual test and easily observable light reaction.

In another approach to studying photosynthesis, light-absorbing pigments such as chlorophyll can be extracted from chloroplasts. Like so many important biological systems in the cell, the photosynthetic system is ordered and compartmentalized in a system of membranes.

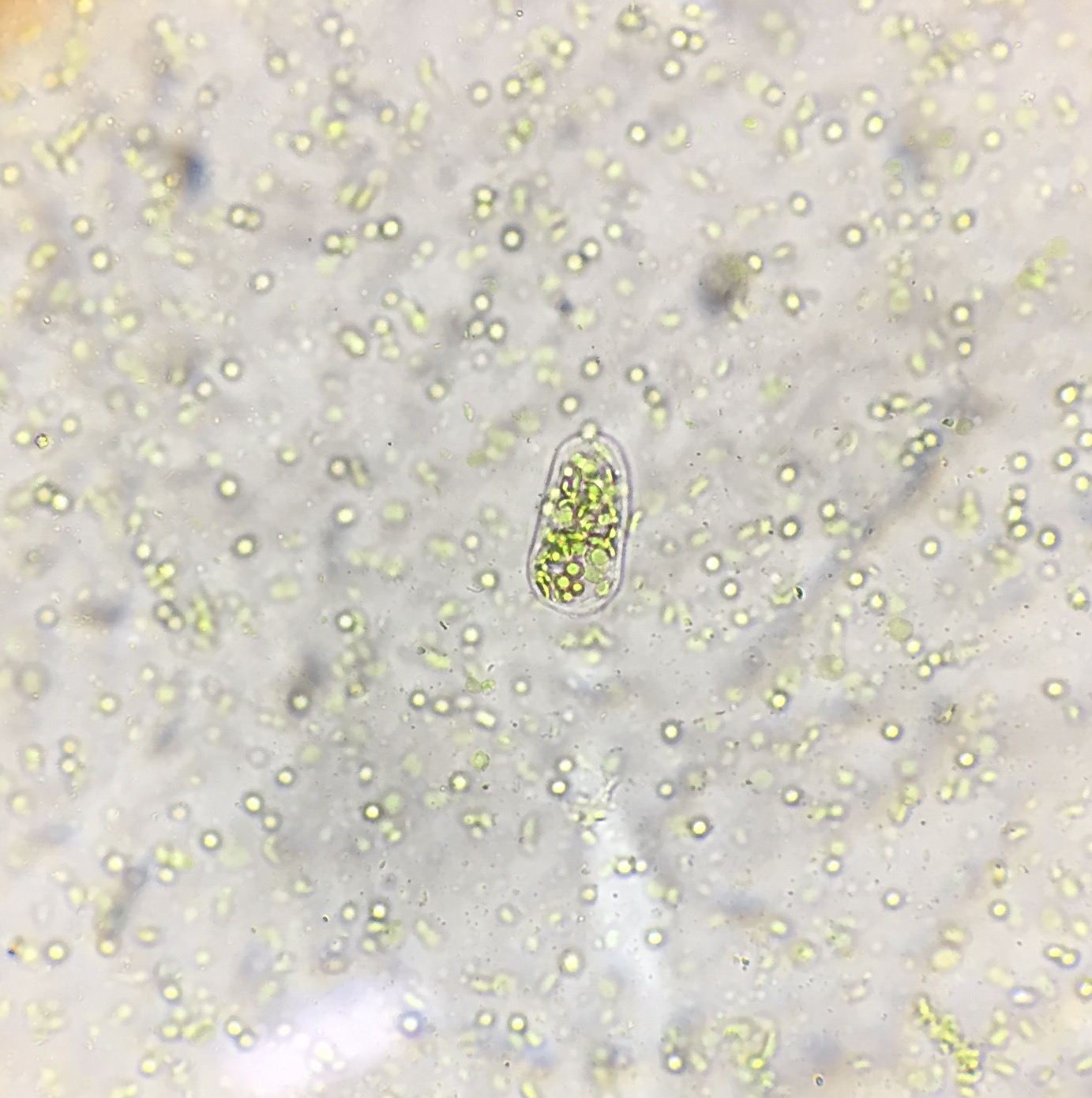
Isolated chloroplasts from spinach leaves, viewed under light microscope

== See also ==
- Cell biology
- Photophosphorylation
- Daniel I. Arnon
