= Francis Dickens (disambiguation) =

Francis Dickens was the son of Charles Dickens.

Francis or Frank Dickens or Dickins is also the name of:

- Frank Dickens (1932–2016), British cartoonist
- Frank Dickens (biochemist)
- Francis Dickins, MP for Cambridge
