= 2,6-Dichloroquinone-4-chloroimide =

Names
- Preferred IUPAC name 2,6-Dichloro-4-(chloroimino)cyclohexa-2,5-dien-1-one

Identifiers
CAS Number	101-38-2
3D model (JSmol)	Interactive image
ChEMBL	ChEMBL3276931
ChemSpider	7275
ECHA InfoCard	100.002.671
EC Number	202-937-2
PubChem CID	7556
UNII	Y19A13RZO0
CompTox Dashboard (EPA)	DTXSID2059229
- InChI: InChI=1S/C6H2Cl3NO/c7-4-1-3(10-9)2-5(8)6(4)11/h1-2H Key: YHUMTHWQGWPJOQ-UHFFFAOYSA-N
- SMILES: C1=C(C(=O)C(=CC1=NCl)Cl)Cl

Properties
Chemical formula	C_{6}H_{2}Cl_{3}NO
Molar mass	210.44 g·mol^{−1}

Hazards
- GHS labelling
Pictograms	(GHS02: Flammable) (GHS07: Exclamation mark)
Signal word	Warning
Hazard statements	H242, H315, H319, H335
Precautionary statements	P210, P220, P234, P261, P264, P271, P280, P302+P352, P304+P340, P305+P351+P338, P312, P321, P332+P313, P337+P313, P362, P370+P378, P403+P233, P403+P235, P405, P411, P420, P501
- Except where otherwise noted, data are given for materials in their standard state (at 25 °C [77 °F], 100 kPa). Infobox references

2,6-Dichloroquinone-4-chloroimide (Gibbs reagent) is an organic compound used as an colorimetric indicator to detect phenolic compounds. Upon reaction with phenol itself, 2,6-dichlorophenolindophenol is formed, a chemical that is used as a redox indicator.
