= Laricitrin =

- Chemical structure of laricitrin

Names
- IUPAC name 3,3′,4′,5,7-Pentahydroxy-5′-methoxyflavone
- Systematic IUPAC name 2-(3,4-Dihydroxy-5-methoxyphenyl)-3,5,7-trihydroxy-4H-1-benzopyran-4-one
- Other names 3'-O-Methylmyricetin

Identifiers
CAS Number	53472-37-0
3D model (JSmol)	Interactive image
ChEBI	CHEBI:31763
ChemSpider	4445351
KEGG	C12633
PubChem CID	5282154
UNII	JQZ2DUC4C9
CompTox Dashboard (EPA)	DTXSID40415210
- InChI: InChI=1S/C16H12O8/c1-23-11-3-6(2-9(19)13(11)20)16-15(22)14(21)12-8(18)4-7(17)5-10(12)24-16/h2-5,17-20,22H,1H3 Key: CFYMYCCYMJIYAB-UHFFFAOYSA-N; InChI=1/C16H12O8/c1-23-11-3-6(2-9(19)13(11)20)16-15(22)14(21)12-8(18)4-7(17)5-10(12)24-16/h2-5,17-20,22H,1H3 Key: CFYMYCCYMJIYAB-UHFFFAOYAK
- SMILES: O=C1c3c(O/C(=C1/O)c2cc(O)c(O)c(OC)c2)cc(O)cc3O

Properties
Chemical formula	C_{16}H_{12}O_{8}
Molar mass	332.264 g·mol^{−1}
- Except where otherwise noted, data are given for materials in their standard state (at 25 °C [77 °F], 100 kPa). verify (what is ?) Infobox references

Laricitrin is an O-methylated flavonol, a type of flavonoid. It is found in red grape (absent in white grape) and in Vaccinium uliginosum (bog bilberries). It is one of the phenolic compounds present in wine.

== Metabolism ==
Laricitrin is formed from myricetin by the action of the enzyme myricetin O-methyltransferase. It is further methylated by laricitrin 5'-O-methyltransferase into syringetin.

=== Glycosides ===
- Laricitrin 3-O-galactoside, found in grape
- Laricitrin 3-glucoside found in Larix sibirica
- Laricitrin 3,5’-di-O-β-glucopyranoside, found in Medicago littoralis
