= Myricetin =

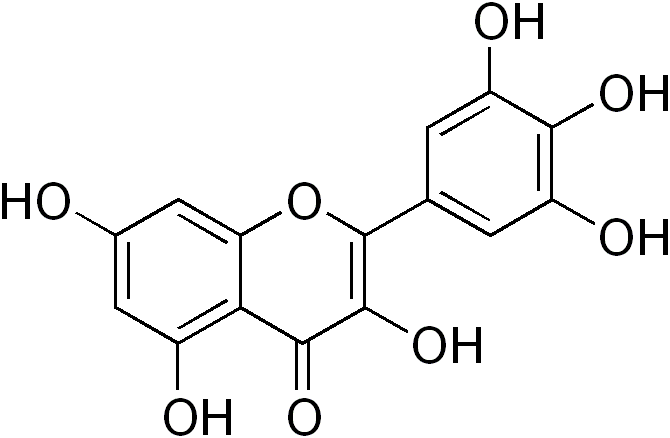

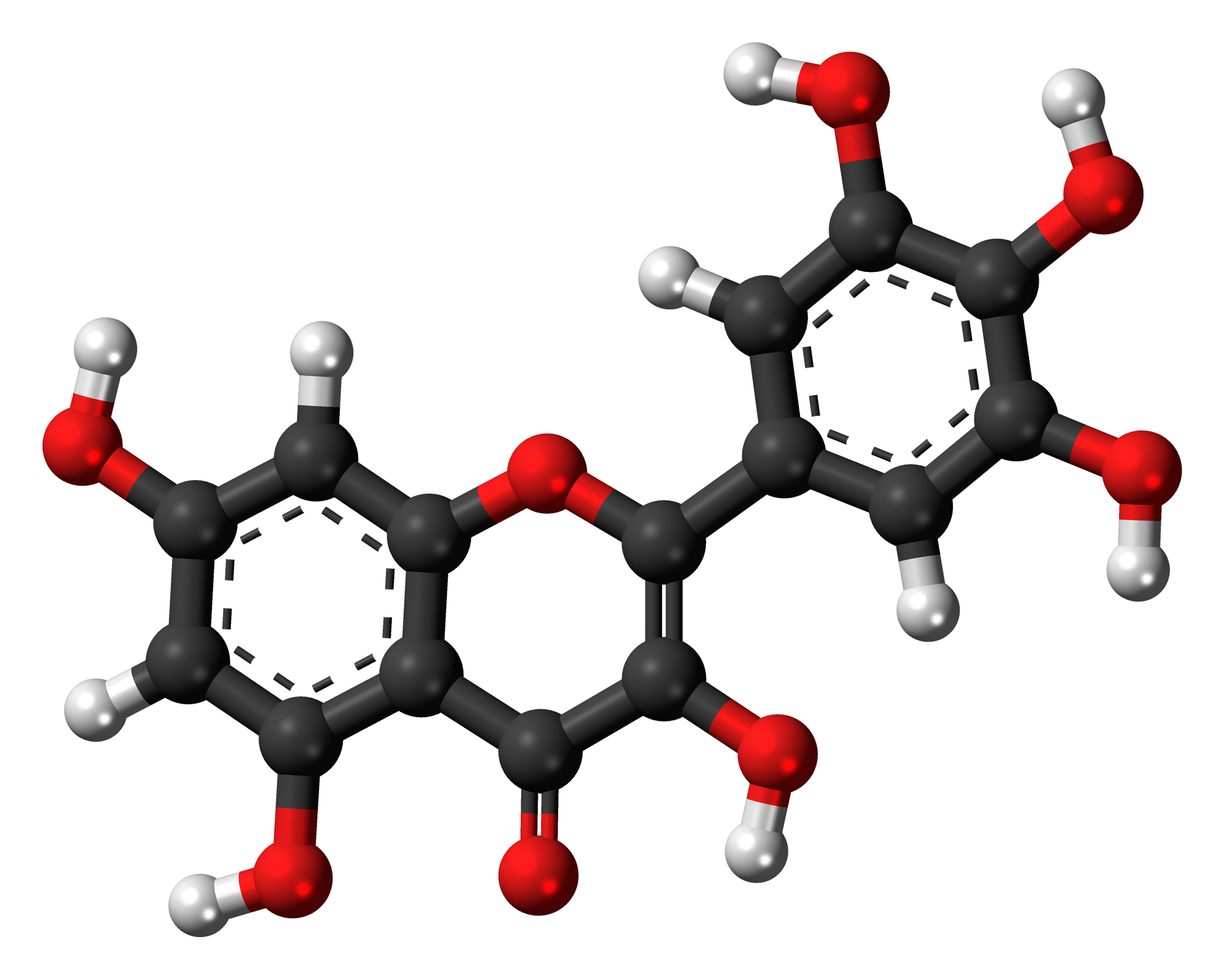

Names
- IUPAC name 3,3′,4′,5,5′,7-Hexahydroxyflavone
- Systematic IUPAC name 3,5,7-Trihydroxy-2-(3,4,5-trihydroxyphenyl)-4H-1-benzopyran-4-one
- Other names Cannabiscetin; Myricetol; Myricitin

Identifiers
CAS Number	529-44-2
3D model (JSmol)	Interactive image
ChEBI	CHEBI:18152
ChEMBL	ChEMBL164
ChemSpider	4444991
DrugBank	DB02375
ECHA InfoCard	100.007.695
EC Number	208-463-2
KEGG	C10107
PubChem CID	5281672
UNII	76XC01FTOJ
CompTox Dashboard (EPA)	DTXSID8022400
- InChI: InChI=1S/C15H10O8/c16-6-3-7(17)11-10(4-6)23-15(14(22)13(11)21)5-1-8(18)12(20)9(19)2-5/h1-4,16-20,22H Key: IKMDFBPHZNJCSN-UHFFFAOYSA-N
- SMILES: Oc1cc(O)c2c(=O)c(O)c(oc2c1)c3cc(O)c(O)c(O)c3

Properties
Chemical formula	C_{15}H_{10}O_{8}
Molar mass	318.237 g·mol^{−1}
Density	1.912 g/mL

Hazards
- GHS labelling
Pictograms	(GHS07: Exclamation mark)
Signal word	Warning
Hazard statements	H315, H319, H335
Precautionary statements	P261, P264, P271, P280, P302+P352, P304+P340, P305+P351+P338, P312, P321, P332+P313, P337+P313, P362, P403+P233, P405, P501
- Except where otherwise noted, data are given for materials in their standard state (at 25 °C [77 °F], 100 kPa). verify (what is ?) Infobox references

Myricetin is a member of the flavonoid class of polyphenolic compounds, with antioxidant properties. Common dietary sources include vegetables (including tomatoes), fruits (including oranges), nuts, berries, tea, and red wine.

Myricetin is structurally similar to fisetin, luteolin, and quercetin and is reported to have many of the same functions as these other members of the flavonol class of flavonoids. Reported average intake of myricetin per day varies depending on diet, but has been shown in the Netherlands to average 23 mg/day.

Myricetin is produced from the parent compound taxifolin through the (+)-dihydromyricetin intermediate and can be further processed to form laricitrin and then syringetin, both members of the flavonol class of flavonoids. Dihydromyricetin is frequently sold as a supplement and has controversial function as a partial GABA_{A} receptor potentiator and treatment in Alcohol Use Disorder (AUD). Myricetin can alternatively be produced directly from kaempferol, which is another flavonol.

== Sources ==
Foods	Myricetin (mg/100g)
carob fiber	48
fennel leaves, raw	20
parsley, fresh	15
goji berry, dried	11
bog blueberry, frozen	7
carob flour	7
cranberry	7
dock, raw	6
European black currant, raw	6
crowberry	5
rabbit-eye blueberry, raw	5
sweet potato leaves, raw	4

== Oxidative Properties ==
=== Antioxidant ===
Antioxidants are molecules present in fruits and vegetables that have been demonstrated to protect against some forms of cancer and cardiovascular disease. Biomolecules and cell structures can experience oxidative stress due to the presence and activity of reactive oxygen species (ROS). ROS like •OH, •O_{2}^{−}, and H_{2}O_{2} are produced during cellular metabolism processes (aerobic respiration). ROS can damage lipids, DNA, and proteins.

Gradual but steady accretion of such damage can lead to the development of many diseases and conditions including thrombosis, diabetes, persistent inflammation, cancer, and atherosclerosis. Flavonoids including myricetin are able to scavenge for ROS and can chelate intracellular transition metal ions that ultimately produce ROS.

Myricetin also enhances the effects of other antioxidants. Myricetin can induce the enzyme glutathione S-transferase (GST). GST has been suggested to protect cells against oxidative stress by protecting cells against free-radicals. In vitro studies have shown that myricetin significantly increased GST activity.

=== Pro-oxidant ===
Multiple studies have demonstrated that myricetin also has the potential to act as a pro-oxidant due to its tendency to undergo autoxidation depending upon its environment. It has been seen that when in the presence of cyanide, autoxidation is favored, resulting in superoxide, a byproduct characteristic of causing cellular damage. However, sodium azide, superoxide dismutase, and catalase have been seen to inhibit the autoxidation of myricetin.

Myricetin may also act as a pro-oxidant in its ability to increase the production of hydroxy radicals through reactions with Fe^{2+} or Fe^{3+}−EDTA and hydrogen peroxide. The resulting hydroxy radicals are often linked to DNA degradation, however, there are doubts as to whether or not this damage would be significant when analyzed in vivo since in vitro studies with both bovine and human serum albumin exhibited extensive protection against it.

Myricetin's pro-oxidative capabilities can also be seen in its ability to act as an inhibitory agent against glutathione reductase, which is responsible for regenerating glutathione, a scavenger of free radicals and peroxides.

== Potential health effects ==
=== Anticarcinogen ===
Myricetin is also effective in protecting cells from carcinogenic mutation. Myricetin reduces the risk of skin tumorigenicity that is caused by polycyclic aromatic hydrocarbons like benzo(a)pyrene, a highly carcinogenic compound. Myricetin provided protection against the formation of skin tumors in mice models after tumor initiating and tumor promoter agents were applied to the skin. On a more biochemical level, it was shown that topical application of myricetin to mice inhibited the binding of benzo(a)pyrenes to DNA and protein native to epidermal skin cells.

Myricetin also has been shown to inhibit the act of genetic mutation as exhibited by the Ames test. This test showed that myricetin was more effective in preventing mutagenesis initiated by certain carcinogenic polycyclic aromatic hydrocarbons (benzo(a)pyrene, dibenzo(a,h)pyrene, and dibenzo(a,i)pyrene) as compared to others in which it was less effective in preventing against mutagenesis (benzo(a)pyrene 4, 5-oxide and the bay-region diol-epoxides of benzo(a)anthracene, chrysene, and benzo(c)phenathrene). This data shows that myricetin is not unilaterally able to reduce the carcinogenic activity of all polycyclic aromatic hydrocarbons or even the more specific subclass of benzo(a)pyrenes. Myricetin's exact biochemical activity is still not fully understood. Clearly there is a multifaceted, complex system involved in the anticarcinogenic activity displayed by myricetin that does not apply equally to all carcinogens of the same subfamily.

=== Mutagen ===
It has also been shown that myricetin can itself act as an agent of mutagenicity. Myricetin can produce frameshift mutations in the genomes of particular strains of Salmonella typhimurium. In general, biochemical structural studies have shown that flavonoid structures can tautomerize in biological systems to become active mutagens.

=== Interactions with DNA ===
Myricetin can act as a pro-oxidant compound when it interacts with DNA. Studies involving in vitro models have shown that myricetin causes the degradation of DNA. Additionally, myricetin, in the presence of Fe^{3+} and Cu^{2+}, intensified this DNA degradation. The antioxidants catalase, superoxide dismutase, mannitol, and sodium azide in combination with Cu^{2+} increased the DNA degradation activity of myricetin. Myricetin was shown to create reactive oxygen species that caused the DNA damage.

It has been demonstrated that myricetin, depending on its concentration, displays different oxidizing effects on DNA. Polyphenols like myricetin are able to reduce (donate electrons to) Fe^{3+}. Thus, this reaction yields a less oxidized (more reduced) form of the iron cation: Fe^{2+} and a less reduced (more oxidized) form of myricetin. This allows myricetin to form a complex with oxygen and biochemically target the DNA molecule. At higher and higher concentrations of myricetin, the rate of DNA damage has been shown to decrease. A current hypothesis for why this occurs can be attributed to myricetin's ability to chelate iron (Fe) (myricetin ligand forms two or more coordinate bonds to iron). These in vitro studies cannot be correlated directly to human models and should not be extrapolated.

Myricetin also impacts the biochemical efficacy and binding ability of large intracellular biomolecules. Myricetin has been shown to inhibit viral reverse transcriptase, cellular DNA polymerase, and cellular RNA polymerase. Inhibition of cellular DNA polymerases could have dangerous effects on the cell's ability to replicate its genome and its progression through the cell cycle. Inhibition of cellular RNA polymerase could have deleterious effects on the cell's capacity to transcribe and translate DNA and RNA to produce vital proteins for the cell. Researchers have found that myricetin has the ability to interfere in the RNA polymerase pathway in two different ways. In E. coli myricetin competitively inhibited GTP substrate binding to RNA polymerase. In T7 bacteriophages myricetin competitively inhibited DNA template binding to RNA polymerase.

=== Antiviral ===
Myricetin has been seen to demonstrate antiviral activity against a number of viruses including Moloney murine leukemia virus, Rauscher murine leukemia virus, and the human immunodeficiency virus. Its effects against the proliferation of viruses is thought to be a consequence of myricetin's ability to inhibit the proper functioning of reverse transcriptase. Myricetin was identified as a competitive inhibitor of the reverse transcriptase of Rauscher murine leukemia virus and a partial competitor with respect to the human immunodeficiency virus. Investigations into the activity of the HIV-1 strain when introduced to myricetin suggest the antiviral effects are derived from the inhibition of HIV-1 integrase, however, there are suspicions that the inhibition is non-specific. Structural analysis of myricetin and other flavonoids with observed antiviral effects indicate that the 3,4' free hydroxyl groups likely are responsible for inhibition.

=== Antithrombotic ===
Polyphenols such as myricetin may prevent oxidative stress-induced platelet activation/aggregation. Thus, consumption of antioxidants may serve an anti-thrombotic function. In addition to offering protection by neutralizing peroxide radicals and effecting thromboxane production via the PTGS1 pathway, polyphenols such as myricetin may target other platelet activation pathways, limiting fibrinogen's ability to bind platelet surface receptors.

=== Antidiabetic ===
Several in vitro and animal studies have indicated the antidiabetic capabilities of myricetin; however, the evidence in clinical trials is less convincing. The flavonoid has been demonstrated to have a hypoglycemic effect by increasing the ability of adipocytes, as well as cells of the soleus muscle and liver of rats, to uptake glucose. This insulinomimetic effect is hypothesized to be a consequence of myricetin's either direct or indirect interaction with GLUT4, however, no analysis has produced concrete conclusions detailing exactly from where this effect is derived. In the hepatocytes of rats suffering from diabetes, myricetin has been observed to increase the activity of glycogen synthase 1. In trials done on Xenopus laevis oocytes, myricetin is thought to regulate the transport of glucose and fructose through the function of glucose transporter 2 (GLUT2) in sugar absorption. In addition, daily injections of myricetin into rats has been seen to be correlated with increased sensitivity to insulin, indicating the possibility of using a myricetin as treatment or protection against insulin resistance, a frequent cause of diabetes mellitus. In the mouse myoblast cell line known as C2C12, treatment with myricetin not only increased glucose uptake, but also enhanced lipogenesis, a result not seen from any of the other bioflavonoids tested.

Although myricetin has not been concluded to have more than a neutral effect on humans, it has been used as a form of traditional medicine for diabetes in Northern Brazil and is hypothesized by the Finnish Mobile Clinic Health Examination Survey to potentially be correlated to the lower risk of Type 2 diabetes in individuals whose diets included higher than average amounts of myricetin. However, since studies in the United States, such as the Women's Health Study, do not confirm these results, there is doubt of whether or not the difference is risk can actually be accredited to myricetin and is not the result of the inability to fully control other variables such as racial background or inconsistencies in diet between participants.

There is also evidence indicating that other characteristics of myricetin, such as its effect against inflammation, oxidative stress, and hyperlipidemia, may be helpful to reduce or even prevent other clinical issues which arise from diabetes mellitus.

=== Antiatherosclerotic ===
Antioxidants, including flavonoids such as myricetin, are often touted to reduce the risk of atherosclerosis, the hardening of arteries associated with high cholesterol. However, in vivo studies are lacking and in vitro studies are contradictory and do not support this claim. This claim is based on myricetin's proposed ability to increase LDL uptake by macrophages, which in theory would protect against atherosclerosis. This theoretical action of myricetin is not supported by experimental data. It is also proposed that myricetin may have the ability as a potent flavonoid antioxidant to prevent LDL oxidation, thus slowing the body's local inflammatory response and delaying the appearance of the first fatty streak and onset of atherosclerosis.

Although mechanisms relating to myricetin specifically have not been proven, a diet that is rich in fruits and vegetables, and therefore rich in antioxidants, correlates with a decreased risk of cardiovascular disease, including atherosclerosis.

=== Neuroprotectant ===
It has also been shown that myricetin is effective in protecting neurons against oxidative stressors. Researchers have shown that PC12 cells treated with hydrogen peroxide (H_{2}O_{2}) as an oxidative stressor experience cell death due to apoptosis. When treated with myricetin, these oxidatively stressed cells displayed statistically significant increased cell survival. It has been suggested that myricetin not only has oxygen radical scavenging abilities, but also inherent, specific cell-survival capacities. Other molecules known for oxygen radical scavenging (vitamin E and boldine) did not successfully protect the cell models from oxidative stress and eventual cell death as effectively as myricetin and other biochemically related molecules.

=== Anti-inflammatory ===
Myricetin, along with other lipoxygenase- and cyclooxygenase-blocker flavonoids are seen to have significant anti-inflammatory characteristics, demonstrated by their ability to reduce edemas caused by carrageenan and croton oil. The anti-inflammatory nature of myricetin lies in its ability to inhibit the amplified production of cytokines that occurs during inflammation. Testing on various types of macrophage cells, including RAW264.7, as well as on human synovial sarcoma cells, demonstrated the inhibition of several kinds of cytokines, such as interleukin-12 and interleukin-1β, through down-regulation of transcription factors and mediators involved in their production. Other studies suggest that myricetin's anti-inflammatory nature could also potentially be dependent upon interfering in inflammatory signal pathways by inhibiting various kinases and, consequently, the function of tumor necrosis factor alpha.

=== Anti-platelet aggregation activity ===
Exposure to myricetin caused inhibition of rabbit platelet aggregation, induced by adenosine diphosphate, arachidonic acid, collagen and platelet activating factor (PAF). It inhibited specific receptor binding of PAF in rabbit platelets. The compound was found to be active against thrombin and neutrophil elastase. In addition, A prostacyclin-stimulated rise in the levels of platelet adenosine 3',5'-cyclic monophosphate (cAMP) was stimulated by myricetin.

=== Immunomodulatory activities ===
Myricetin's preclinical immunomodulatory properties are now becoming increasingly widely known. It was discovered that myricetin may prevent T-lymphocyte stimulation in a mouse model by binding to anti-CD3 and anti-CD28 monoclonal antibodies immobilised on beads. The inhibitory effect of myricetin on T cells, which was described in this study, was explained as being mediated via extracellular H_{2}O_{2} production. Through the inhibition of NF-B binding activity, these natural compounds were reported to significantly reduce the lipopolysaccharide (LPS)-induced interleukin (IL)-12 production in mouse main macrophages as well as the RAW264.7 monocytic cell-line. Myricetin produced epithelial layer contractile reflexes in separate rat aortic rings at a concentration of 50 M. This substance induces the synthesis of cytosolic unbound calcium in cultured bovine endothelial cells. Myricetin suppressed the release of IL-2 protein from mouse EL-4 T cells that had been stimulated with phorbol 12-myristate 13-acetate (PMA) and ionomycin in a daily dosage approach.
