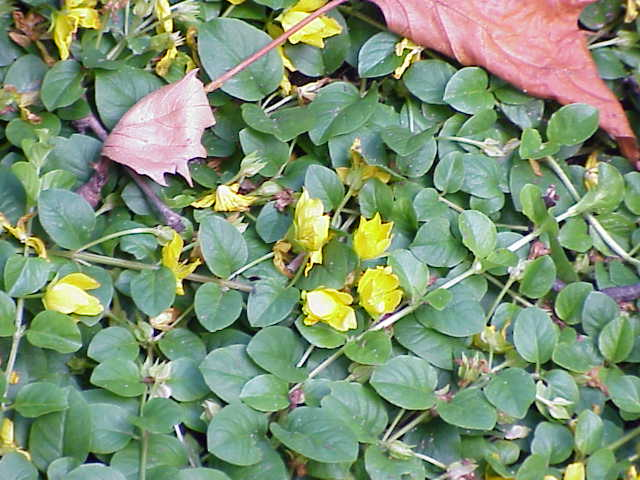

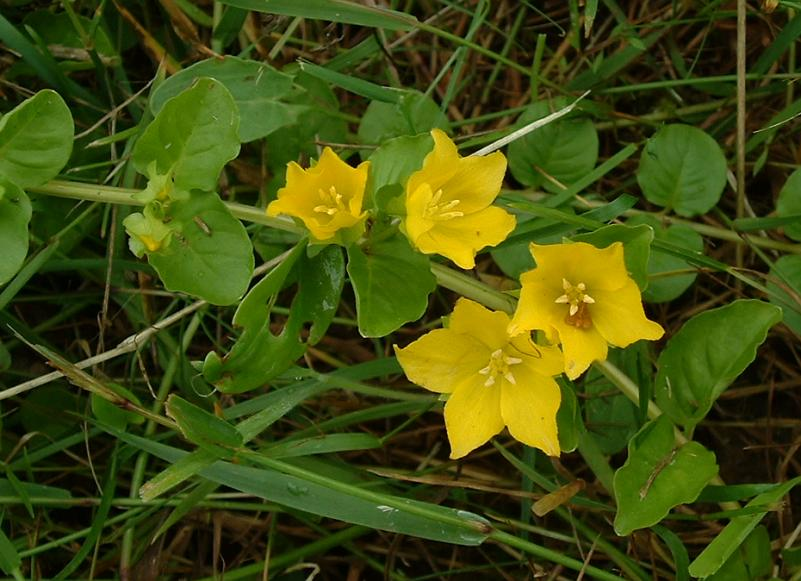

Conservation status
- Least Concern (IUCN 3.1)

Scientific classification
- Kingdom: Plantae
- Clade: Tracheophytes
- Clade: Angiosperms
- Clade: Eudicots
- Clade: Asterids
- Order: Ericales
- Family: Primulaceae
- Genus: Lysimachia
- Species: L. nummularia

Binomial name
- Lysimachia nummularia L.

= Lysimachia nummularia =

Species of flowering plant in the Primulaceae

Lysimachia nummularia is a species of flowering plant in the primrose family Primulaceae. Its common names include moneywort, creeping jenny, (Note: This name also sometimes refers to Lysimachia congestiflora.) herb twopence and twopenny grass.

== Description ==
It is a vigorous, prostrate, evergreen perennial growing to 5 cm (2 in) in height and spreading rapidly and indefinitely by stem-rooting. It has rounded leaves arranged in opposite pairs, and cup-shaped yellow flowers 2 cm in diameter, in summer. It is particularly associated with damp or even wet areas, though in cultivation it will tolerate drier conditions. It is hardy, surviving lows of −15 °C (5 °F) (RHS H5).

== Distribution ==
It is native to Europe, but has been introduced to North America, where it is considered an invasive species in some areas. It aggressively spreads in favorable conditions, such as low wet ground or near ponds. It can be weeded by hand, if all stems and stem fragments are removed, to prevent the stems from rooting and regrowing.

== Etymology ==
The Latin specific epithet nummularia means "like a coin", referring to the shape of the leaves; hence the common names, such as "moneywort", which also references coins.

== Cultivation ==
The cultivar 'Aurea' (golden creeping Jenny) has yellow leaves, and is somewhat less aggressive than the undomesticated species. It is cultivated as an ornamental plant, for groundcover where the range of its growth can be limited. It is also suitable as a bog garden or aquatic marginal plant. It has gained the Royal Horticultural Society's Award of Garden Merit.

== Chemistry ==
The plant contains a number of phenolic acids.
