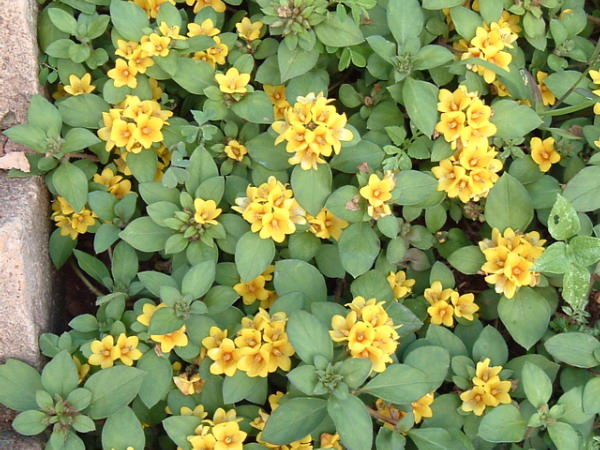

Scientific classification
- Kingdom: Plantae
- Clade: Embryophytes
- Clade: Tracheophytes
- Clade: Angiosperms
- Clade: Eudicots
- Clade: Asterids
- Order: Ericales
- Family: Primulaceae
- Genus: Lysimachia
- Species: L. congestiflora

Binomial name
- Lysimachia congestiflora Hemsl.

Synonyms
- Lysimachia congestiflora var. atronervata C.C.Wu; Lysimachia gymnocephala Hand.-Mazz.; Lysimachia hui Diels; Lysimachia japonica var. cephalantha Franch.; Lysimachia rubroglandulosa C.Y.Wu; Lysimachia smithiana Craib

= Lysimachia congestiflora =

Species of flowering plant

Lysimachia congestiflora, known as golden globes loosestrife or creeping Jenny, (Note: "Creeping Jenny" usually refers to Lysimachia nummularia.) is a species of flowering plant in the primrose family Primulaceae. It is native to southeast Asia.

== Description ==
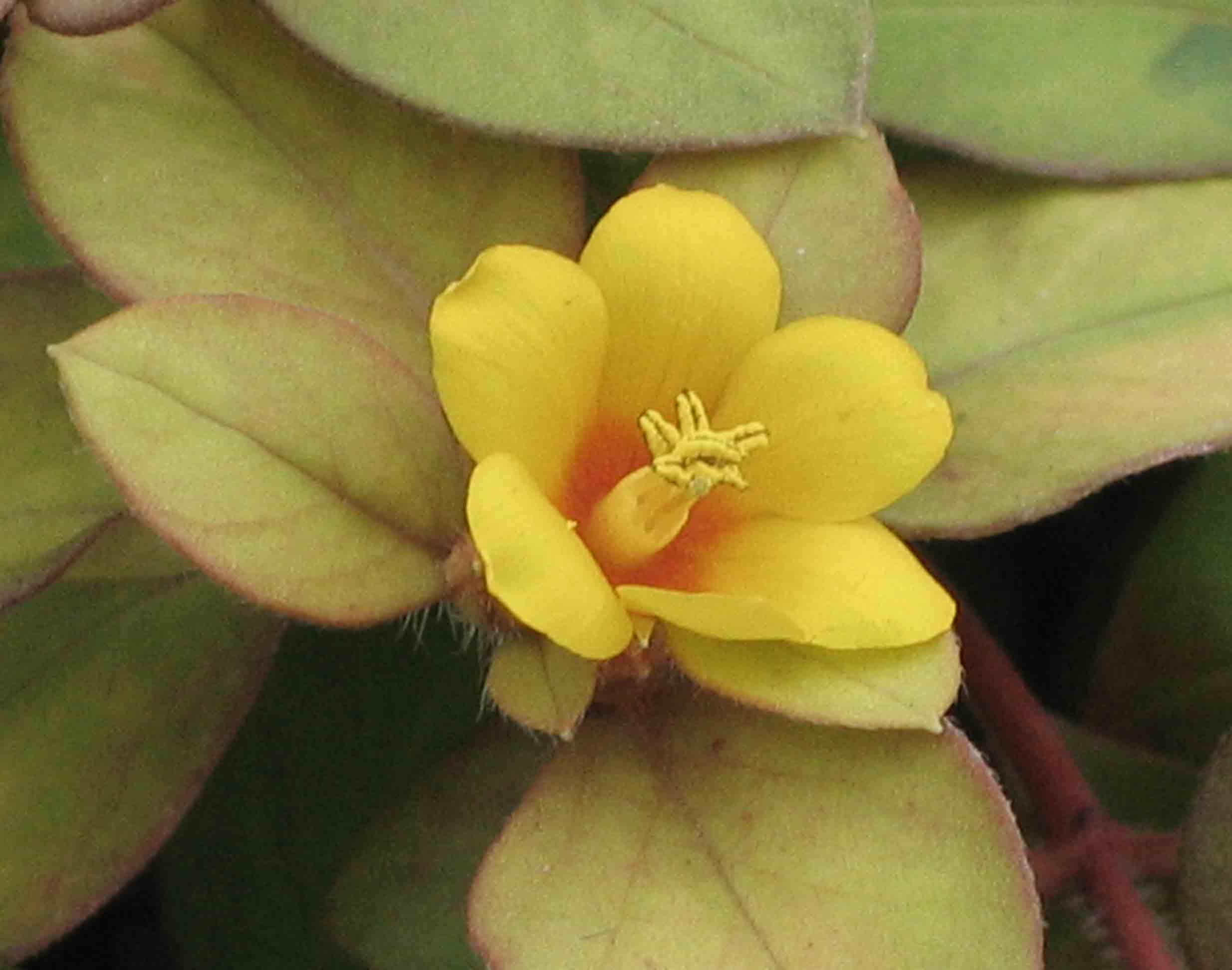
Flower closeup

It is an aboveground perennial and a herbaceous, stolon-former plant that reaches heights of 10 to 20 cm. The stem is creeping to ascending and forms knots at the roots.

The leaves are opposite. There are two pairs of leaves just below the inflorescence. The leaf blade measures (0.7) 1.4 to 3 (4.5) × (0.6) 1.3 to 2.2 (3) centimetres and is ovate to broadly ovate or almost circular. It has pressed, articulated hair, and mainly has reddish or black glandular points on the edge.

=== Inflorescences ===
The flowers are heaped upside down at the end of the stem in two to four. The flowers are colored yellow with a red eye. The ovary is hairy. The flowering period extends from spring to summer.

== Distribution ==
It occurs in China, Bhutan, northeast India, Nepal, Sikkim, Myanmar and Thailand in moist forest edges, bushes and the edges of rice fields at altitudes of 200 to 2100 meters.

== Cultivation ==
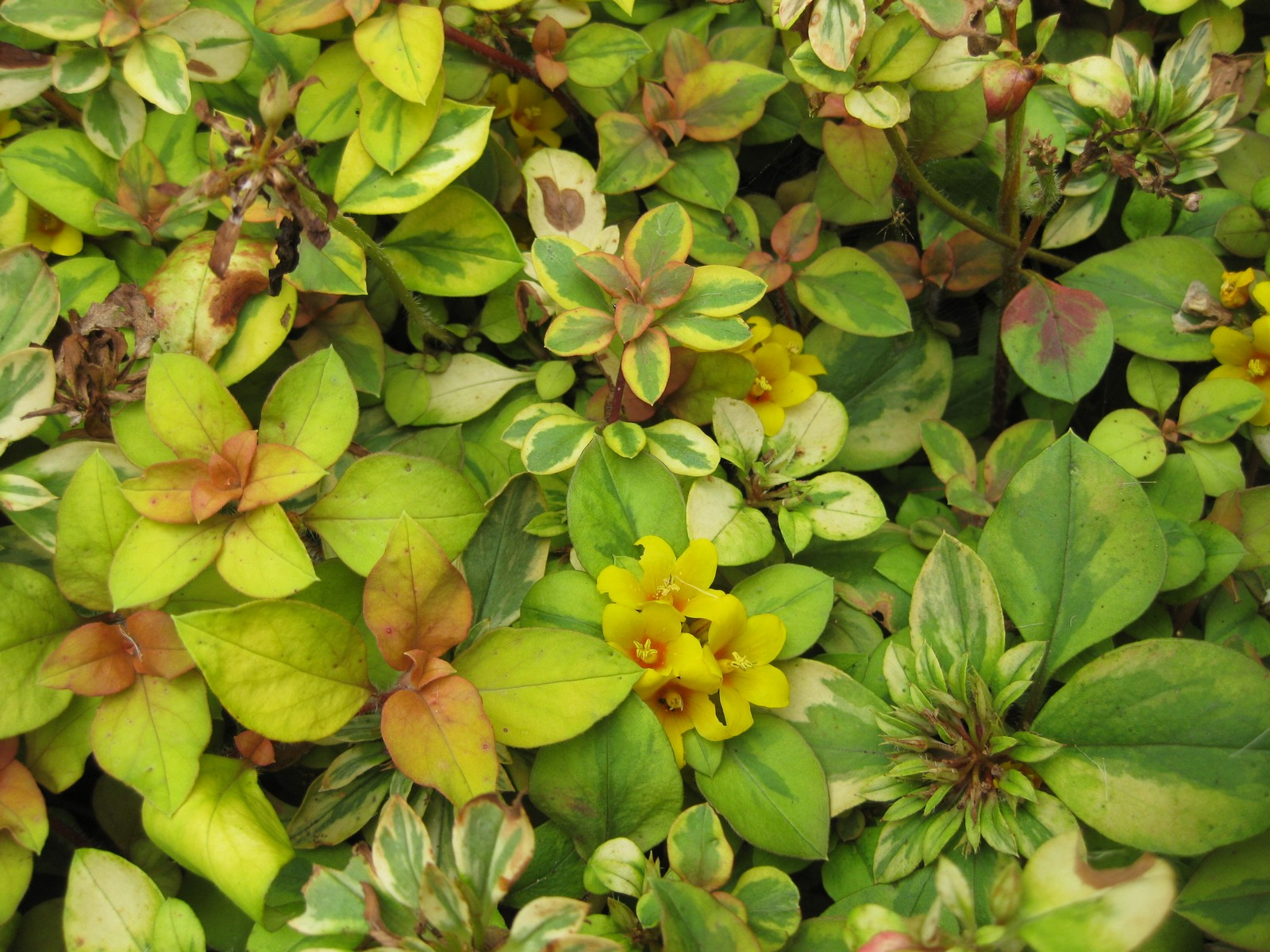
'Outback Sunset' cultivar

It is grown as an ornamental plant for its bright yellow flowers and easy maintenance, in moist well-drained soils, thriving in full sun to partial shade. It can be grown from stem cuttings. Cultivars include:

- ‘Aurea’
- 'Outback Sunset' (variegated leaves)
- ‘Persian Chocolate’ (purplish foliage)
- 'Waikiki Sunset' (variegated leaves)
- ‘Zimai’ (purple-veined leaves)

== Chemistry ==
Lysimachia congestiflora yields the O-methylated flavonol syringetin.
