= Myricetin O-methyltransferase =

Enzyme

Identifiers
- EC no.: 2.1.1.149

Databases
- IntEnz: IntEnz view
- BRENDA: BRENDA entry
- ExPASy: NiceZyme view
- KEGG: KEGG entry
- MetaCyc: metabolic pathway
- PRIAM: profile
- PDB structures: RCSB PDB PDBe PDBsum
Search
- PMC: articles
- PubMed: articles
- NCBI: proteins

In enzymology, a myricetin O-methyltransferase (EC 2.1.1.149) is an enzyme that catalyzes the chemical reaction

2 S-adenosyl-L-methionine + myricetin $\rightleftharpoons$ 2 S-adenosyl-L-homocysteine + syringetin

Thus, the two substrates of this enzyme are S-adenosyl methionine and myricetin, whereas its two products are S-adenosylhomocysteine and syringetin.

This enzyme belongs to the family of transferases, specifically those transferring one-carbon group methyltransferases. The systematic name of this enzyme class is S-adenosyl-L-methionine:myricetin O-methyltransferase.
