= Robin Hill (biochemist) =

British plant biochemist

Robert Hill FRS
- Robert Hill FRS
- Born: Robert Hill; 2 April 1899; Leamington Spa, Warwickshire, United Kingdom
- Died: 15 March 1991 (aged 91)
- Education: University of Cambridge
- Known for: Hill reaction; Hill reagent
- Awards: Royal Medal (1963); Copley Medal (1987)
- Scientific career
- Fields: Biochemistry
- Notable students: Frederick Whatley; David Alan Walker (postdoc)

Robert Hill FRS (2 April 1899 – 15 March 1991), known as Robin Hill, was a British plant biochemist who, in 1939, demonstrated the 'Hill reaction' of photosynthesis, proving that oxygen is evolved during the light requiring steps of photosynthesis. He also made significant contributions to the development of the Z-scheme of oxygenic photosynthesis.

== Education and early life ==
Hill was born in New Milverton, a suburb of Leamington Spa, Warwickshire. He was educated at Bedales School, where he became interested in biology and astronomy (he published a paper on sunspots in 1917), and Emmanuel College, Cambridge, where he read Natural Sciences. During the First World War he served in the Anti-gas Department of the Royal Engineers.

== Career ==
In 1922, he joined the Department of Biochemistry at Cambridge, where he was directed to research haemoglobin. He published a number of papers on haemoglobin, and in 1926 he began to work with David Keilin on the haem containing protein cytochrome c. In 1932, he commenced work on plant biochemistry, focusing on photosynthesis and the oxygen evolution of chloroplasts, leading to the discovery of the 'Hill reaction'.

From 1943, Hill's work was funded by the Agricultural Research Council (ARC), although he continued to work in the Cambridge Biochemistry Department. Hill continued to receive most of his recognition for his earlier work on photosynthesis, and beginning in the late 1950s, his work concentrated on the energetics of photosynthesis. In collaboration with Fay Bendall, he made his second great contribution to photosynthesis research with the discovery of the 'Z scheme' of electron transport.

Hill retired from the ARC in 1966, although his research at Cambridge continued until his death in 1991. In his later years Hill worked on the issue of the application of the second law of thermodynamics to photosynthesis.

He was an expert on natural dyes and cultivated plants such as madder and woad. He painted watercolours using pigments he himself extracted. In the 1920s, he developed a fish-eye camera and used it to take stereoscopic whole-sky images, recording cloud patterns in three dimensions.

== Awards and honours ==
The Robert Hill Institute at the University of Sheffield, from which he received an honorary degree in 1990, was named after him. Hill was elected a Fellow of the Royal Society (FRS) in 1946, his certificate of election reads:

Distinguished for his research on Haemoglobin and Photosynthesis. He was the first to demonstrate the reconstruction of haemoglobin from its components: globin and haematin. This was the first case of the splitting and reconstruction of a conjugated protein. He determined the properties and dissociation curve of myoglobin which explain the physiological function of the pigment. He also determined the structure and properties of several haematin compounds thereby aiding the study of their catalytic activities. He discovered a new approach to the biochemical study of photosynthesis which enabled him to demonstrate and to measure the evolution of oxygen by isolated chloroplasts exposed to light in the complete absence of CO2. This remarkable photochemical reaction was found by him to have the same properties as "light reaction" obtained with intact green cells in presence of CO2, and it led him to formulate an interesting working hypothesis of the mechanism of photosynthesis.

He was awarded the Royal Medal in 1963, and the Copley Medal in 1987.
