= List of fellows of the Royal Society elected in 1946 =

This is a list of people elected Fellow of the Royal Society in 1946.

== Fellows ==
- Agnes Arber, third woman elected and first female botanist
- Wilson Baker
- Sir George Lindor Brown
- Sir Gordon Roy Cameron
- Frank Dickens
- Harry Julius Emeleus
- Sir Frank Leonard Engledow
- Edmund Brisco Ford
- Robert Alexander Frazer
- Sir Claude Dixon Gibb
- Edward Armand Guggenheim
- Robert Hill
- Chalmers Jack Mackenzie
- Sir Ernest Marsden
- William George Penney, 1st Baron Penney of East Hendred
- Sir John Turton Randall
- Roderick Oliver Redman
- Archibald Read Richardson
- Louis Rosenhead
- John Alexander Sinton
- Harold Haydon Storey
- Sir Harold Warris Thompson
- John William Trevan
- Lawrence Rickard Wager
- Sir Francis Martin Rouse Walshe
- Charles Maurice Yonge

== Foreign members ==
- Herbert Spencer Gasser
- Jean Frederic Joliot
- Theodore von Kármán
- Erik Helge Oswald Stensiö
