= Pro-oxidant =

Chemical that induces oxidative stress

Pro-oxidants are chemicals that induce oxidative stress, either by generating reactive oxygen species or by inhibiting antioxidant systems. The oxidative stress produced by these chemicals can damage cells and tissues, for example, an overdose of the analgesic paracetamol (acetaminophen) can fatally damage the liver, partly through its production of reactive oxygen species.

Some substances can serve as either antioxidants or pro-oxidants, depending on conditions. Some of the important conditions include the concentration of the chemical and if oxygen or transition metals are present. While thermodynamically very favored, reduction of molecular oxygen or peroxide to superoxide or hydroxyl radical respectively is spin forbidden. This greatly reduces the rates of these reactions, thus allowing aerobic life to exist. As a result, the reduction of oxygen typically involves either the initial formation of singlet oxygen, or spin–orbit coupling through a reduction of a transition-series metal such as manganese, iron, or copper. This reduced metal then transfers the single electron to molecular oxygen or peroxide.

== Metals ==
Transition metals can serve as pro-oxidants. For example, chronic manganism is a classic "pro-oxidant" disease. Another disease associated with the chronic presence of a pro-oxidant transition-series metal is hemochromatosis, associated with elevated iron levels. Similarly, Wilson's disease is associated with elevated tissue levels of copper. Such syndromes tend to be associated with common symptomology. Thus, all are occasional symptoms of (e.g) hemochromatosis, another name for which is "bronze diabetes". The pro-oxidant herbicide paraquat, Wilson's disease, and striatal iron have similarly been linked to human Parkinsonism. Paraquat also produces Parkinsonian-like symptoms in rodents.

== Fibrosis ==
Fibrosis or scar formation is another pro-oxidant-related symptom. E.g., interocular copper or vitreous chalicosis is associated with severe vitreous fibrosis, as is interocular iron. Liver cirrhosis is also a major symptom of Wilson's disease. The pulmonary fibrosis produced by paraquat and the antitumor agent bleomycin is also thought to be induced by the pro-oxidant properties of these agents. It may be that oxidative stress produced by such agents mimics a normal physiological signal for fibroblast conversion to myofibroblasts.

== Pro-oxidant vitamins ==
Vitamins that are reducing agents can be pro-oxidants. Vitamin C has antioxidant activity when it reduces oxidizing substances such as hydrogen peroxide, however, it can also reduce metal ions which leads to the generation of free radicals through the Fenton reaction.

2 Fe^{2+} + 2 H_{2}O_{2} → 2 Fe^{3+} + 2 OH· + 2 OH^{−}

2 Fe^{3+} + Ascorbate → 2 Fe^{2+} + Dehydroascorbate

The metal ion in this reaction can be reduced, oxidized, and then re-reduced, in a process called redox cycling that can generate reactive oxygen species.

The relative importance of the antioxidant and pro-oxidant activities of antioxidant vitamins is an area of current research, but vitamin C, for example, appears to have a mostly antioxidant action in the body. However, less data is available for other dietary antioxidants, such as polyphenol antioxidants, zinc, and vitamin E.

== Use in medicine ==
Several important anticancer agents both bind to DNA and generate reactive oxygen species. These include adriamycin and other anthracyclines, bleomycin, and cisplatin. These agents may show specific toxicity towards cancer cells because of the low level of antioxidant defenses found in tumors. Recent research demonstrates that redox dysregulation originating from metabolic alterations and dependence on mitogenic and survival signaling through reactive oxygen species represents a specific vulnerability of malignant cells that can be selectively targeted by pro-oxidant non-genotoxic redox chemotherapeutics.

Photodynamic therapy is used to treat some cancers as well as other conditions. It involves the administration of a photosensitizer followed by exposing the target to appropriate wavelengths of light. The light excites the photosensitizer, causing it to generate reactive oxygen species, which can damage or destroy diseased or unwanted tissue.

== See also ==
- Antioxidant
- Oxidizing agent
- Reducing agent
- Methylene blue
- DCPIP
