= Hill reagent =

Dye used in biochemistry

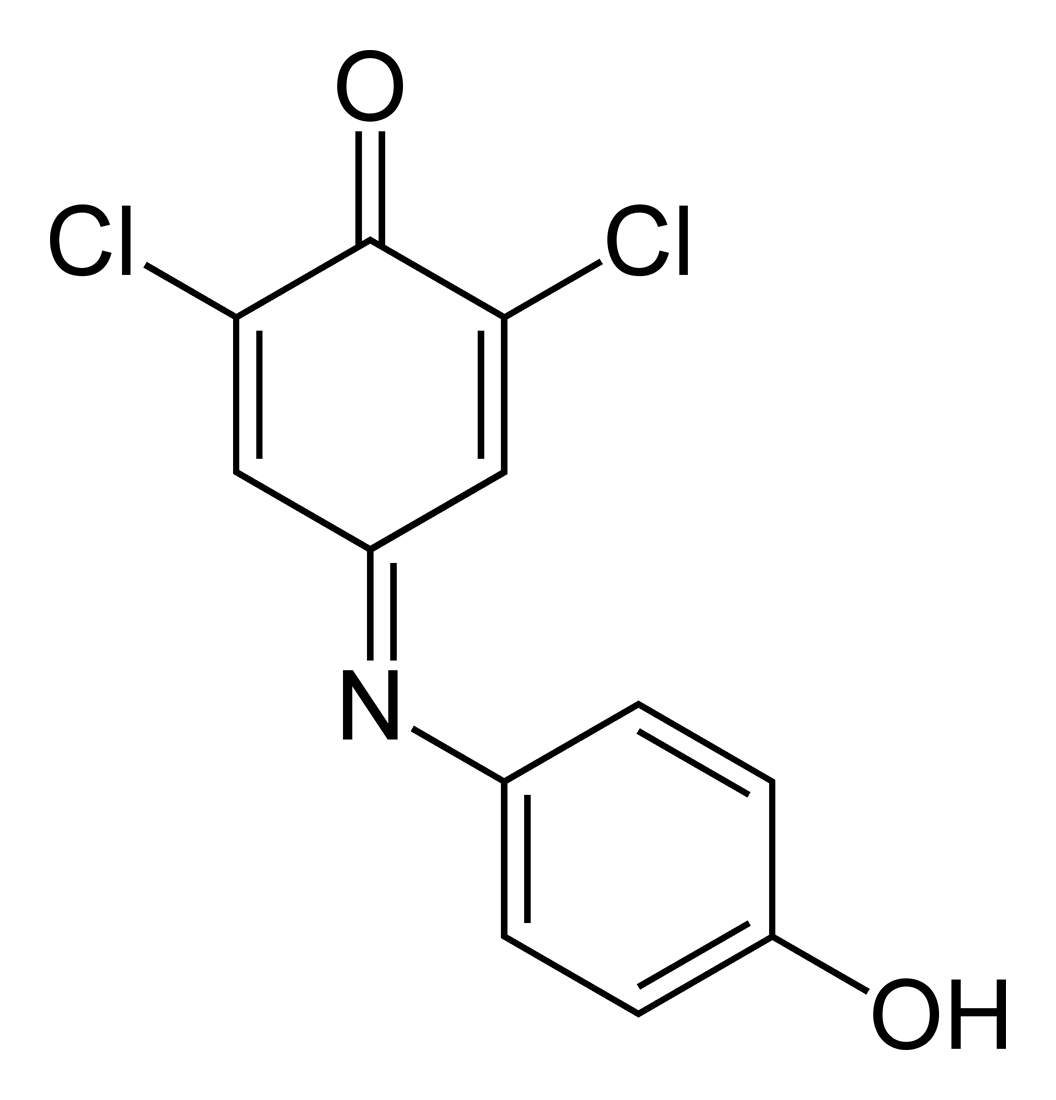
Chemical structure of 2,6-dichlorophenolindophenol, a Hill reagent

Discovered in 1937 by Robin Hill, Hill reagents allowed the discovery of electron transport chains during photosynthesis. These are dyes that act as artificial electron acceptors, changing color when they are reduced. An example of a Hill reagent is 2,6-dichlorophenolindophenol (DCPIP).
