= Frank Dickens (biochemist) =

British biochemist (1899–1986)

Frank Dickens FRS (15 December 1899 – 15 June 1986) was a biochemist, best known for his work at the Courtauld Institute of Biochemistry with Edward Charles Dodds on the pentose phosphate pathway which generates NADPH.

== Early life ==
He was born in Northampton, England, and educated at Northampton Grammar School. He father was the owner of a leather factory in Kettering Road, Northampton, which his four brothers joined and turned into Dickens Brothers Ltd. However, Frank developed an interest in science and won a scholarship to Magdalene College, Cambridge in 1918. He did not take this up till 1919 as he enlisted in the army, becoming a second lieutenant in the Northamptonshire Regiment, although he was not in action. He graduated in 1921, with a 2nd class degree, and then attended Imperial College, London and obtained a PhD in organic chemistry.

== Career ==
In 1923 he began research at the Middlesex Hospital in London working with Dodds on insulin to make it available for patients. He then did work with Dodds on the isolation of the female sex hormone stilboestrol which led to its eventual synthesis in 1938.

He spent 1929 working with Otto Warburg in Berlin and later translated Warburg's book Über den Stoffwechsel der Tumoren (On the Metabolism of Tumours) into English.

From 1933 to 1946 Dickens was director of the Cancer Research Laboratory at the Royal Victoria Infirmary in Newcastle upon Tyne. Dodds then invited him back to the Courtauld Institute as the Philip Hill Professor of Experimental Biochemistry where he did research on the mechanism of how energy is derived by living tissues from carbohydrates, known as the "pentose phosphate pathway", and its link to the rate of tumour growth.

== Personal life ==
He married Molly Jelleyman of Northampton in 1925 and they had two daughters, Jane and Diana, and eight grandchildren. He became a Fellow of the Royal Society in 1946. He died at Ferring, a small village now part of Worthing, West Sussex.

== Bibliography ==
- The Chemical and Physiological Properties of the Internal Secretions E C Dodds & F. Dickens Pub: Oxford University Press (1925) ASIN: B000KMKBP2
- The Metabolism of Tumours Otto Heinrich Warburg (Author) F Dickens (translation) Publisher: Constable (1930) ASIN: B00087B1OY
