= Dichlorophenolindophenol =

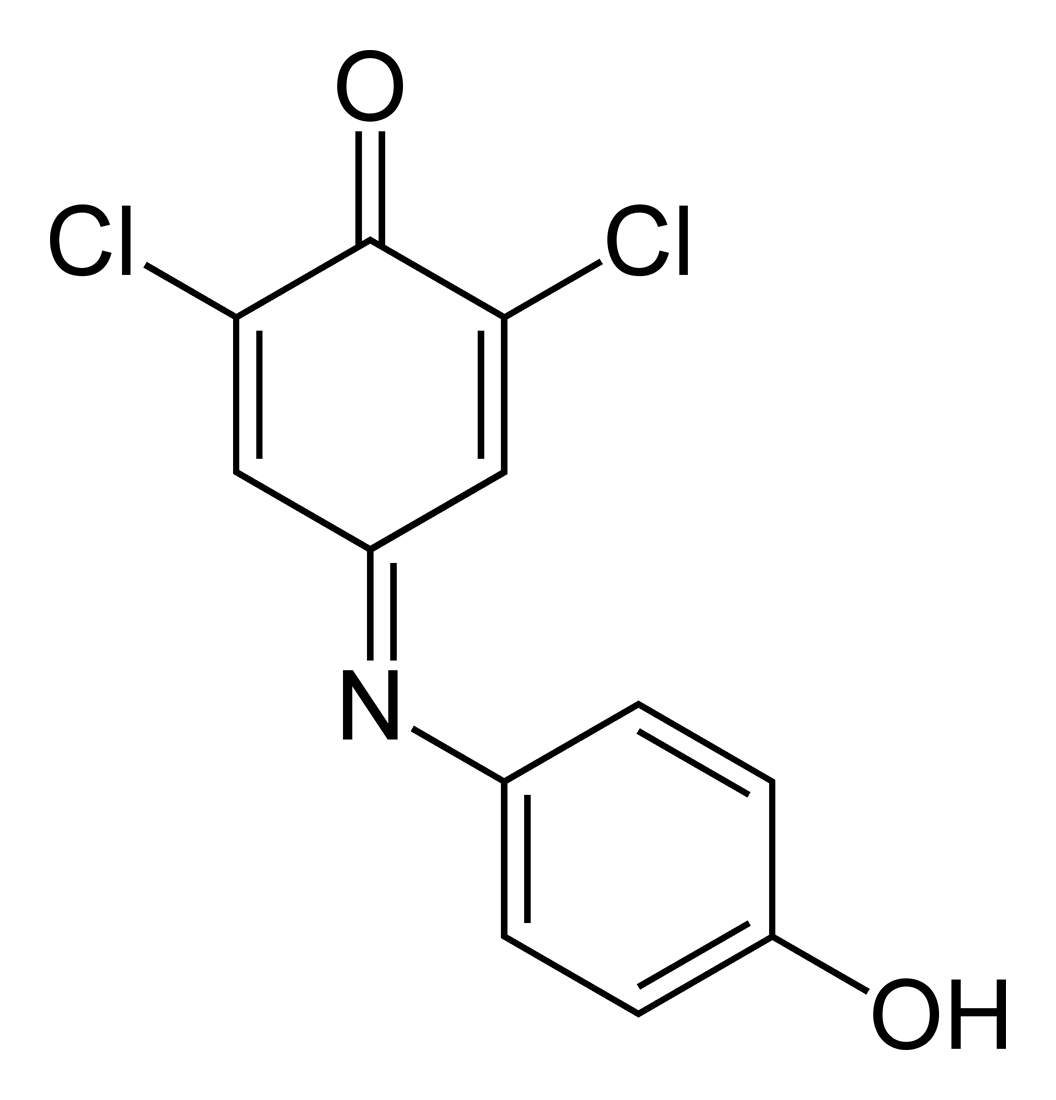

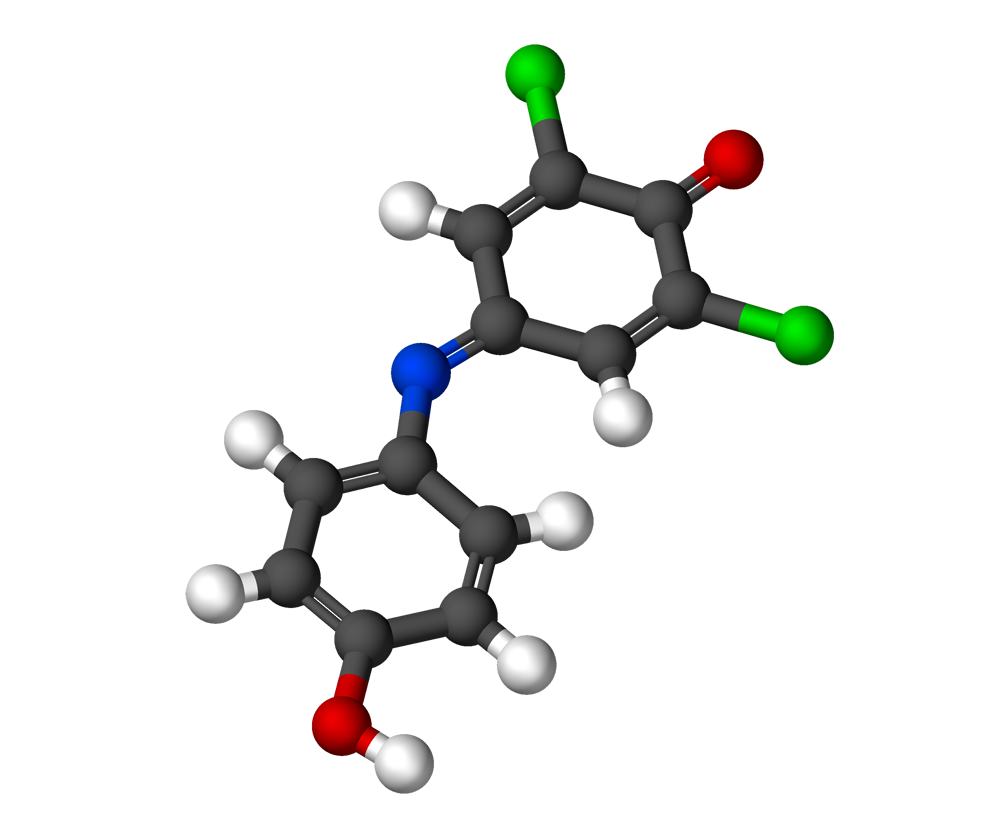

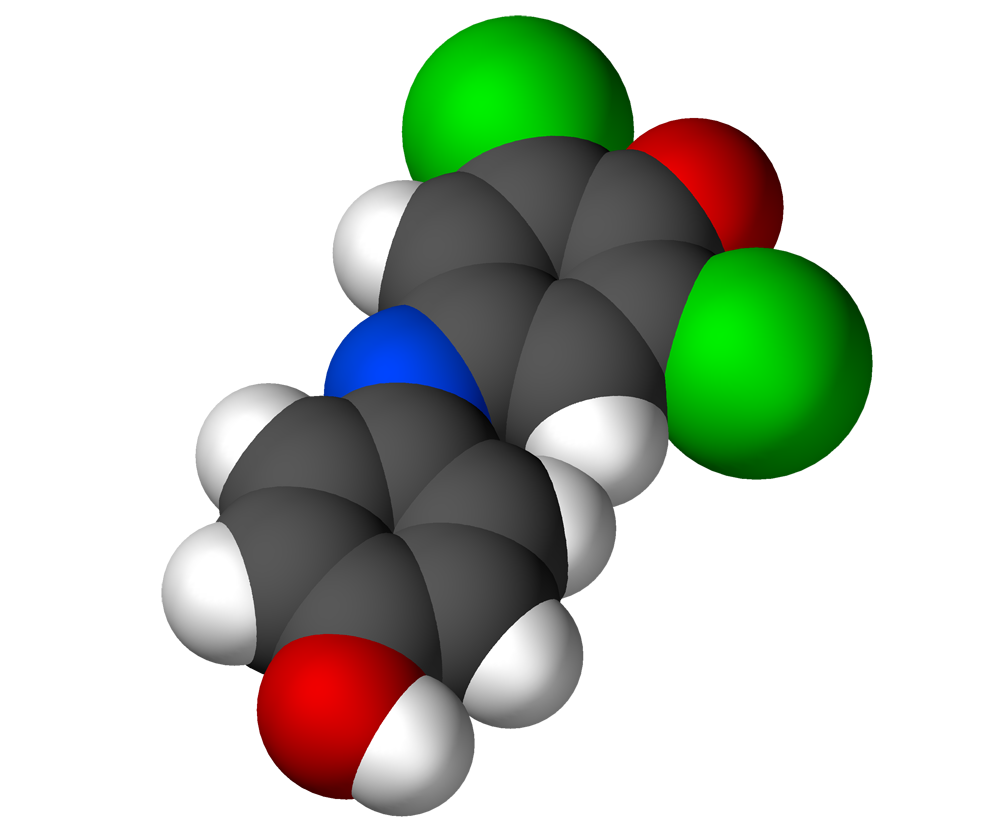

Names
- Preferred IUPAC name 4-(3,5-dichloro-4-hydroxyphenyl)iminocyclohexa-2,5-dien-1-one
- Other names Dichloroindophenol (); 2,6-Dichlorophenolindophenol; 2,6-Dichloroindophenol; 2,6-Dichloro-4-[(4-hydroxyphenyl)imino]-2,5-cyclohexadien-1-one

Identifiers
CAS Number	956-48-9
3D model (JSmol)	Interactive image
Abbreviations	DCPIP, DCIP, DPIP
ChEBI	CHEBI:945
ChEMBL	ChEMBL500871
ChemSpider	10661857
ECHA InfoCard	100.012.254
EC Number	213-479-8
KEGG	C00102
PubChem CID	13726
UNII	C35QN2Z58B
CompTox Dashboard (EPA)	DTXSID501174455 DTXSID7061352, DTXSID501174455
- InChI: InChI=1S/C12H7Cl2NO2/c13-10-5-8(6-11(14)12(10)17)15-7-1-3-9(16)4-2-7/h1-6,16H Key: CCBICDLNWJRFPO-UHFFFAOYSA-N; InChI=1/C12H7Cl2NO2/c13-10-5-8(6-11(14)12(10)17)15-7-1-3-9(16)4-2-7/h1-6,16H Key: CCBICDLNWJRFPO-UHFFFAOYAL
- SMILES: Cl\C2=CC(=N/c1ccc(O)cc1)/C=C(/Cl)C2=O

Properties
Chemical formula	C_{12}H_{7}Cl_{2}NO_{2}
Molar mass	268.09 g·mol^{−1}

Hazards
- GHS labelling
Pictograms	(GHS07: Exclamation mark)
Signal word	Warning
Hazard statements	H302, H315, H319, H335
Precautionary statements	P261, P264, P270, P271, P280, P301+P312, P302+P352, P304+P340, P305+P351+P338, P312, P321, P330, P332+P313, P337+P313, P362, P403+P233, P405, P501
- Except where otherwise noted, data are given for materials in their standard state (at 25 °C [77 °F], 100 kPa). verify (what is ?) Infobox references

2,6-Dichlorophenolindophenol (DCPIP, DCIP or DPIP) is a chemical compound used as a redox dye. When oxidized, DCPIP is blue with a maximal absorption at 600 nm; when reduced, DCPIP is colorless.

DCPIP can be used to measure the rate of photosynthesis and is an example of a Hill reagent. When exposed to light in a photosynthetic system, the dye is decolorised by chemical reduction. DCPIP has a higher affinity for electrons than ferredoxin and the photosynthetic electron transport chain can reduce DCPIP as a substitute for NADP^{+}, that is normally the final electron carrier in photosynthesis. As DCPIP is reduced and becomes colorless, the resultant increase in light transmittance can be measured using a spectrophotometer.

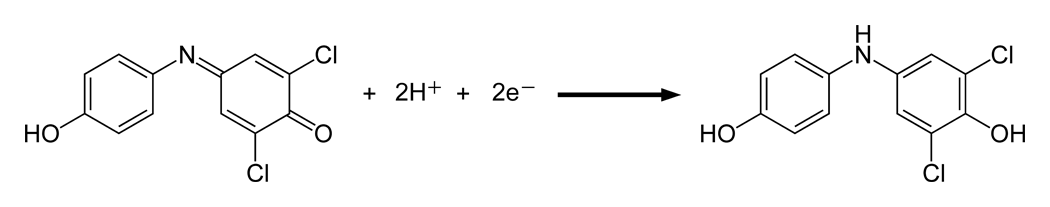

DCPIP can also be used as an indicator for vitamin C. If vitamin C, which is a good reducing agent, is present, the blue dye, which turns pink in acidic conditions, is reduced to a colorless compound by ascorbic acid. This reaction is a redox reaction: vitamin C (ascorbic acid) is oxidized to dehydroascorbic acid, and DCPIP is reduced to the colorless compound DCPIPH_{2}

DCPIP (blue) + H^{+} → DCPIPH (pink)
DCPIPH (pink) + vitamin C → DCPIPH_{2} (colorless)

In this titration, when all the ascorbic acid in the solution has been used up, there will not be any electrons available to reduce the DCPIPH and the solution remains pink due to the DCPIPH. The end point is a pink color that persists for 10 seconds or more, if there is not enough ascorbic acid to reduce all of the DCPIPH. Pharmacological experiments suggest that DCPIP may serve as a pro-oxidant chemotherapeutic targeting human cancer cells in an animal model of human melanoma; DCPIP-induced cancer cell death occurs by depletion of intracellular glutathione and upregulation of oxidative stress.

== See also ==
- Indophenol
- Metachromasy
- Methylene blue
- Wurster's blue
