= Syringetin =

- Chemical structure of syringetin

Names
- IUPAC name 3,4′,5,7-Tetrahydroxy-3′,5′-dimethoxyflavone
- Systematic IUPAC name 3,5,7-Trihydroxy-2-(4-hydroxy-3,5-dimethoxyphenyl)-4H-1-benzopyran-4-one
- Other names 3′,5′-O-Dimethylmyricetin; 3′,5′-Dimethoxy-3,5,7,4′-tetrahydroxyflavone; 3,5,7,4′-Tetrahydroxy-3′,5′-dimethoxyflavone

Identifiers
CAS Number	4423-37-4
3D model (JSmol)	Interactive image
ChEBI	CHEBI:18215
ChEMBL	ChEMBL489142
ChemSpider	4445230
PubChem CID	5281953
UNII	J68JG79B9W
CompTox Dashboard (EPA)	DTXSID60196074
- InChI: InChI=1S/C17H14O8/c1-23-11-3-7(4-12(24-2)14(11)20)17-16(22)15(21)13-9(19)5-8(18)6-10(13)25-17/h3-6,18-20,22H,1-2H3 Key: UZMAPBJVXOGOFT-UHFFFAOYSA-N; InChI=1/C17H14O8/c1-23-11-3-7(4-12(24-2)14(11)20)17-16(22)15(21)13-9(19)5-8(18)6-10(13)25-17/h3-6,18-20,22H,1-2H3 Key: UZMAPBJVXOGOFT-UHFFFAOYAJ
- SMILES: COc1cc(cc(OC)c1O)C=3Oc2cc(O)cc(O)c2C(=O)C=3O

Properties
Chemical formula	C_{17}H_{14}O_{8}
Molar mass	346.291 g·mol^{−1}
- Except where otherwise noted, data are given for materials in their standard state (at 25 °C [77 °F], 100 kPa). verify (what is ?) Infobox references

Syringetin is an O-methylated flavonol, a type of flavonoid. It is found in red grape (absent in white grape), in Lysimachia congestiflora and in Vaccinium uliginosum (bog bilberries). It is one of the phenolic compounds present in wine.

It induces human osteoblast differentiation through bone morphogenetic protein-2/extracellular signal-regulated kinase 1/2 pathway.

== Metabolism ==
Syringetin is formed from laricitrin by the action of the enzyme laricitrin 5′-O-methyltransferase (myricetin O-methyltransferase).

=== Glycosides ===
- Syringetin-3-O-galactoside
- Syringetin-3-O-glucoside
- Syringetin 3-rhamnoside (CAS number 93126-00-2)
- Syringetin-3-O-rutinoside found in Larix sibirica
- Syringetin 3-O-(6′′-acetyl)-β-glucopyranoside found in Picea abies (Norway spruce)
