= O-methyltransferase =

An O-methyltransferase (OMT) is a type of methyltransferase enzyme transferring a methyl group on a molecule.

Examples are :

- Acetylserotonin O-methyltransferase
- Apigenin 4'-O-methyltransferase
- Caffeate O-methyltransferase
- Caffeoyl-CoA O-methyltransferase
- Catechol O-methyltransferase
- Chlorophenol O-methyltransferase
- Columbamine O-methyltransferase
- Demethylmacrocin O-methyltransferase
- 3'-demethylstaurosporine O-methyltransferase
- Demethylsterigmatocystin 6-O-methyltransferase
- 3-demethylubiquinone-9 3-O-methyltransferase
- 3,7-dimethylquercetin 4'-O-methyltransferase
- Fatty-acid O-methyltransferase
- Glucuronoxylan 4-O-methyltransferase
- 10-hydroxydihydrosanguinarine 10-O-methyltransferase
- 12-hydroxydihydrochelirubine 12-O-methyltransferase
- 6-hydroxymellein O-methyltransferase
- 3'-hydroxy-N-methyl-(S)-coclaurine 4'-O-methyltransferase
- 8-hydroxyquercetin 8-O-methyltransferase
- Iodophenol O-methyltransferase
- Isobutyraldoxime O-methyltransferase
- (iso)eugenol O-methyltransferase
- Isoflavone 4'-O-methyltransferase
- Isoflavone 7-O-methyltransferase
- Isoliquiritigenin 2'-O-methyltransferase
- Isoorientin 3'-O-methyltransferase
- Jasmonate O-methyltransferase
- Protein-L-isoaspartate(D-aspartate) O-methyltransferase
- Kaempferol 4'-O-methyltransferase
- Licodione 2'-O-methyltransferase
- Loganate O-methyltransferase
- Luteolin O-methyltransferase
- Macrocin O-methyltransferase
- Methylquercetagetin 6-O-methyltransferase
- 3-methylquercetin 7-O-methyltransferase
- mRNA (nucleoside-2'-O-)-methyltransferase
- Myricetin O-methyltransferase
- N-benzoyl-4-hydroxyanthranilate 4-O-methyltransferase
- O-demethylpuromycin O-methyltransferase
- 6-O-methylnorlaudanosoline 5'-O-methyltransferase
- Phenol O-methyltransferase
- Polysaccharide O-methyltransferase
- Protein-glutamate O-methyltransferase
- Protein-S-isoprenylcysteine O-methyltransferase
- Quercetin 3-O-methyltransferase
- rRNA (adenosine-2'-O-)-methyltransferase
- (RS)-norcoclaurine 6-O-methyltransferase
- (S)-scoulerine 9-O-methyltransferase
- Sterigmatocystin 8-O-methyltransferase
- Tabersonine 16-O-methyltransferase
- Tetrahydrocolumbamine 2-O-methyltransferase
- Tocopherol O-methyltransferase
- tRNA guanosine-2'-O-methyltransferase
- Vitexin 2"-O-rhamnoside 7-O-methyltransferase
- Xanthotoxol O-methyltransferase
