= Rhamnazin =

- Rhamnazin structure

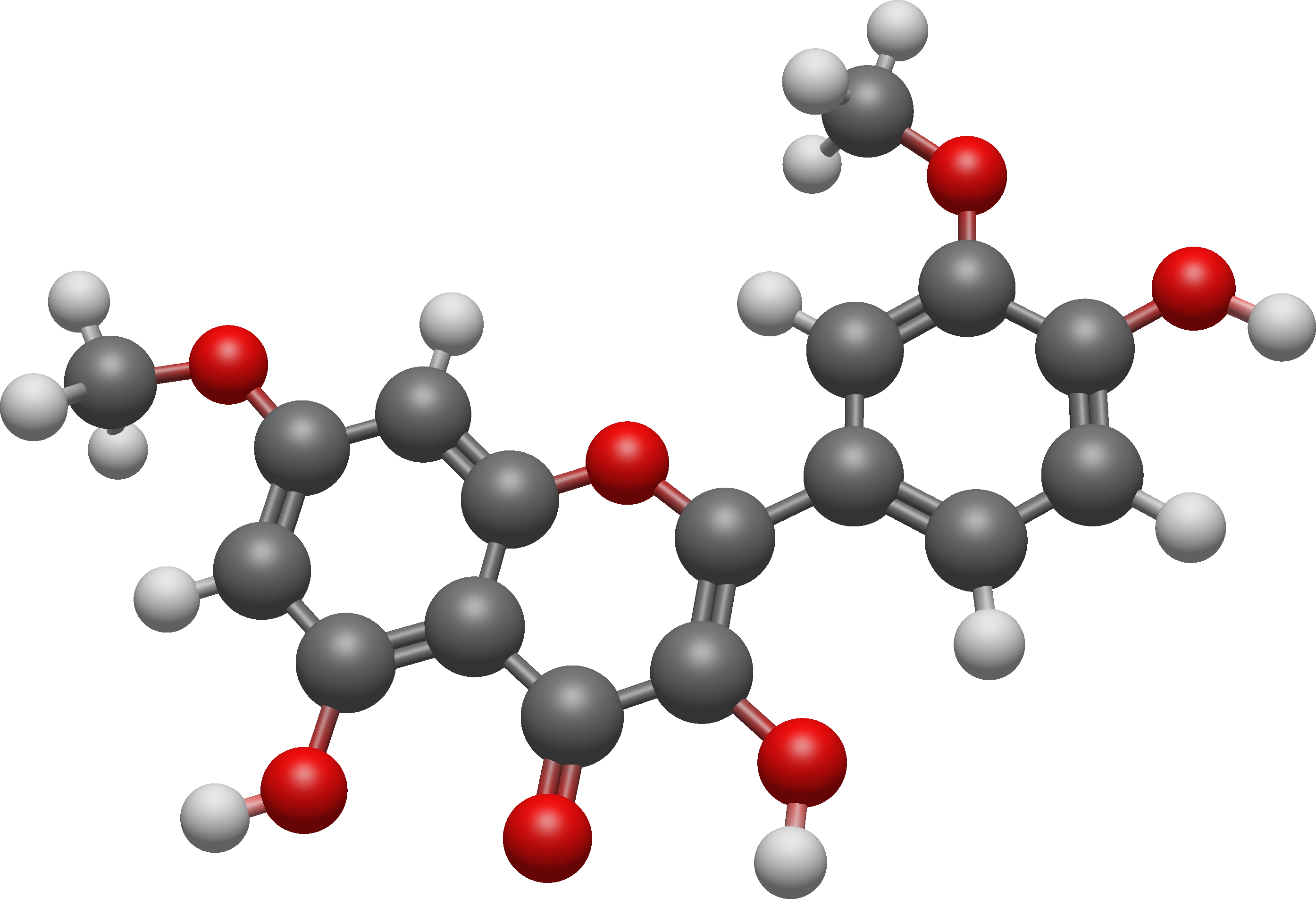
- Rhamnazin structure

Names
- IUPAC name 3,4′,5-Trihydroxy-3′,7-dimethoxyflavone
- Systematic IUPAC name 3,5-Dihydroxy-2-(4-hydroxy-3-methoxyphenyl)-7-methoxy-4H-1-benzopyran-4-one
- Other names 3′,7-Dimethylquercetin; 3,5,4′-Trihydroxy-7,3′-dimethoxyflavone; 5,3′,4′-Trihydroxy-3,7-dimethoxyflavone; Flavone, 3,4′,5-trihydroxy-3′,7-dimethoxy-

Identifiers
CAS Number	552-54-5
3D model (JSmol)	Interactive image
ChEBI	CHEBI:133721
ChEMBL	ChEMBL457148
ChemSpider	4478873
PubChem CID	5320945
UNII	276CK9GP9Y
CompTox Dashboard (EPA)	DTXSID00203695
- InChI: InChI=1S/C17H14O7/c1-22-9-6-11(19)14-13(7-9)24-17(16(21)15(14)20)8-3-4-10(18)12(5-8)23-2/h3-7,18-19,21H,1-2H3 Key: MYMGKIQXYXSRIJ-UHFFFAOYSA-N; InChI=1/C17H14O7/c1-22-9-6-11(19)14-13(7-9)24-17(16(21)15(14)20)8-3-4-10(18)12(5-8)23-2/h3-7,18-19,21H,1-2H3 Key: MYMGKIQXYXSRIJ-UHFFFAOYAP
- SMILES: COC1=CC(=C2C(=C1)OC(=C(C2=O)O)C3=CC(=C(C=C3)O)OC)O

Properties
Chemical formula	C_{17}H_{14}O_{7}
Molar mass	330.292 g·mol^{−1}
- Except where otherwise noted, data are given for materials in their standard state (at 25 °C [77 °F], 100 kPa). verify (what is ?) Infobox references

Rhamnazin is an O-methylated flavonol, a type of chemical compound. It can be found in Rhamnus petiolaris, a buckthorn plant native to Iraq, Lebanon, Syria, and Turkey.

== Metabolism ==
The enzyme 3-methylquercetin 7-O-methyltransferase uses S-adenosyl methionine and isorhamnetin to produce S-adenosyl homocysteine and rhamnazin.

The enzyme 3,7-dimethylquercetin 4'-O-methyltransferase uses S-adenosyl methionine and rhamnazin to produce S-adenosyl homocysteine and ayanin.
