= Ayanin =

- Chemical structure of ayanin

Names
- IUPAC name 3′,5-Dihydroxy-3,4′,7-trimethoxyflavone
- Systematic IUPAC name 5-Hydroxy-2-(3-hydroxy-4-methoxyphenyl)-3,7-dimethoxy-4H-1-benzopyran-4-one
- Other names: 3,7,4'-Tri-O-methylquercetin; 3,7,4'-Trimethylquercetin

Identifiers
CAS Number	572-32-7
3D model (JSmol)	Interactive image
ChEBI	CHEBI:27825
ChEMBL	ChEMBL74898
ChemSpider	4444274
PubChem CID	5280682
UNII	YA465UF3LK
CompTox Dashboard (EPA)	DTXSID20205833
- InChI: InChI=1S/C18H16O7/c1-22-10-7-12(20)15-14(8-10)25-17(18(24-3)16(15)21)9-4-5-13(23-2)11(19)6-9/h4-8,19-20H,1-3H3 Key: KPCRYSMUMBNTCK-UHFFFAOYSA-N
- SMILES: COC1=C(C=C(C=C1)C2=C(C(=O)C3=C(C=C(C=C3O2)OC)O)OC)O

Properties
Chemical formula	C_{18}H_{16}O_{7}
Molar mass	344.319 g·mol^{−1}
Density	1.454 g/mL
- Except where otherwise noted, data are given for materials in their standard state (at 25 °C [77 °F], 100 kPa). Infobox references

Ayanin is an O-methylated flavonol, a type of flavonoid. It is the 3,7,4'-tri-O-methylated derivative of quercetin.

It can be found in Croton schiedeanus. It can also be synthesized.

== Biosynthesis ==
The biosynthesis of ayanin in Chrysosplenium americanum is by the sequential methylation of the flavonol, quercetin. The first enzyme, quercetin 3-O-methyltransferase uses the cofactor, S-adenosyl methionine (SAM) to transfer a methyl group specifically at the 3-position:

quercetin
+ SAM
3-O-methylquercetin
+ SAH

Two additional enzymes, 3-methylquercetin 7-O-methyltransferase and 3,7-dimethylquercetin 4'-O-methyltransferase complete the production of ayanin:

3-O-methylquercetin
7 methyl
3,7-dimethylquercetin
4' methyl
ayanin
