= COQ3 =

Protein-coding gene in humans

Identifiers
- Aliases: COQ3, DHHBMT, DHHBMTASE, UG0215E05, bA9819.1, coenzyme Q3, methyltransferase
- External IDs: OMIM: 605196; MGI: 101813; GeneCards: COQ3
Enzyme activity
EC #	BRENDA	ExPASy	KEGG	MetaCyc
2.1.1.64	↗	↗	↗	↗
2.1.1.114	↗	↗	↗	↗

Gene location (Human)
Chr.	Chromosome 6 (human)
Band	6q16.2	Start	99,369,401 bp
Band	6q16.2	End	99,394,195 bp

Gene location (Mouse)
Chr.	Chromosome 4 (mouse)
Band	4 A3|4 9.11 cM	Start	21,879,673 bp
Band	4 A3|4 9.11 cM	End	21,912,162 bp
RNA expression pattern
Bgee	Human / Mouse (ortholog); Top expressed in: biceps brachii; right ventricle; vastus lateralis muscle; Skeletal muscle tissue of biceps brachii; left ventricle; triceps brachii muscle; deltoid muscle; muscle of thigh; Skeletal muscle tissue of rectus abdominis; apex of heart / Top expressed in: soleus muscle; intercostal muscle; interventricular septum; vastus lateralis muscle; right ventricle; digastric muscle; sternocleidomastoid muscle; cardiac muscle tissue of left ventricle; tibialis anterior muscle; masseter muscle; More reference expression data
BioGPS	n/a
Gene ontology
Molecular function	methyltransferase activity; transferase activity; hexaprenyldihydroxybenzoate methyltransferase activity; 2-polyprenyl-6-methoxy-1,4-benzoquinone methyltransferase activity; O-methyltransferase activity; 3-demethylubiquinone-9 3-O-methyltransferase activity; decaprenyldihydroxybenzoate methyltransferase activity; 3-demethylubiquinol-10 3-O-methyltransferase activity; protein binding
Cellular component	mitochondrial inner membrane; mitochondrial matrix; mitochondrion; membrane; extrinsic component of mitochondrial inner membrane
Biological process	methylation; ubiquinone biosynthetic process; glycerol metabolic process; regulation of ubiquinone biosynthetic process
Sources:Amigo / QuickGO
Orthologs
Databases	NCBI: entry; OMA: entry
Species	Human	Mouse
Entrez	51805	230027
Ensembl	ENSG00000132423	ENSMUSG00000028247
UniProt	Q9NZJ6	Q8BMS4
RefSeq (mRNA)	NM_017421	NM_172687; NM_001356348
RefSeq (protein)	NP_059117	NP_766275; NP_001343277
Location (UCSC)	Chr 6: 99.37 – 99.39 Mb	Chr 4: 21.88 – 21.91 Mb
PubMed search
- Wikidata
View/Edit Human	View/Edit Mouse

COQ3, also known as ubiquinone biosynthesis O-methyltransferase, mitochondrial is an enzyme that in humans is encoded by the COQ3 gene.

== See also ==
- Hexaprenyldihydroxybenzoate methyltransferase, an enzyme
- 3-demethylubiquinone-9 3-O-methyltransferase, an enzyme
