= S-adenosyl-L-methionine:flavonoid 4'-O-methyltransferase =

S-adenosyl-L-methionine:flavonoid 4'-O-methyltransferase may refer to:

- Kaempferol 4'-O-methyltransferase
- Flavonoid 4'-O-methyltransferase
