= Coq3 O-methyltransferase =

Coq3 O-methyltransferase may refer to:

- Hexaprenyldihydroxybenzoate methyltransferase
- 3-demethylubiquinone-9 3-O-methyltransferase
