= 4'-Hydroxyisoflavone methyltransferase =

4'-Hydroxyisoflavone methyltransferase may refer to:

- Isoflavone 4'-O-methyltransferase, an enzyme
- Flavonoid 4'-O-methyltransferase, an enzyme
