= TrmI =

TrmI may refer to:

- TRNA (adenine57-N1/adenine58-N1)-methyltransferase, an enzyme
- TRNA (adenine58-N1)-methyltransferase, an enzyme
