= Mycinamicin III 3''-O-methyltransferase =

Identifiers
- EC no.: 2.1.1.237

Databases
- IntEnz: IntEnz view
- BRENDA: BRENDA entry
- ExPASy: NiceZyme view
- KEGG: KEGG entry
- MetaCyc: metabolic pathway
- PRIAM: profile
- PDB structures: RCSB PDB PDBe PDBsum
Search
- PMC: articles
- PubMed: articles
- NCBI: proteins

Mycinamicin III 3''-O-methyltransferase (EC 2.1.1.237, MycF) is an enzyme with systematic name S-adenosyl-L-methionine:mycinamicin III 3''-O-methyltransferase. This enzyme catalyses the following chemical reaction

S-adenosyl-L-methionine + mycinamicin III $\rightleftharpoons$ S-adenosyl-L-homocysteine + mycinamicin IV

The enzyme is involved in the biosynthesis of mycinamicin macrolide antibiotics.
