= TRNA (guanine-N2-)-methyltransferase =

tRNA (guanine-N2-)-methyltransferase

Identifiers
- EC no.: 2.1.1.32
- CAS no.: 37217-31-5

Databases
- IntEnz: IntEnz view
- BRENDA: BRENDA entry
- ExPASy: NiceZyme view
- KEGG: KEGG entry
- MetaCyc: metabolic pathway
- PRIAM: profile
- PDB structures: RCSB PDB PDBe PDBsum
- Gene Ontology: AmiGO / QuickGO
Search
- PMC: articles
- PubMed: articles
- NCBI: proteins

In enzymology, a tRNA (guanine-N2-)-methyltransferase (EC 2.1.1.32) is an enzyme that catalyzes the chemical reaction

S-adenosyl-L-methionine + tRNA $\rightleftharpoons$ S-adenosyl-L-homocysteine + tRNA containing N_{2}-methylguanine

Thus, the two substrates of this enzyme are S-adenosyl methionine and tRNA, whereas its two products are S-adenosylhomocysteine and tRNA containing N2-Methylguanine.

This enzyme belongs to the family of transferases, specifically those transferring one-carbon group methyltransferases. The systematic name of this enzyme class is S-adenosyl-L-methionine:tRNA (guanine-N2-)-methyltransferase. Other names in common use include transfer ribonucleate guanine 2-methyltransferase, transfer ribonucleate guanine N2-methyltransferase, transfer RNA guanine 2-methyltransferase, guanine-N2-methylase, and S-adenosyl-L-methionine:tRNA (guanine-2-N-)-methyltransferase.

== Structural studies ==
As of late 2007, 3 structures have been solved for this class of enzymes, with PDB accession codes 2DUL, 2EJT, and 2EJU.
