= MRNA (2'-O-methyladenosine-N6-)-methyltransferase =

Enzyme

mRNA (2'-O-methyladenosine-N^{6}-)-methyltransferase

Identifiers
- EC no.: 2.1.1.62
- CAS no.: 68009-87-0

Databases
- IntEnz: IntEnz view
- BRENDA: BRENDA entry
- ExPASy: NiceZyme view
- KEGG: KEGG entry
- MetaCyc: metabolic pathway
- PRIAM: profile
- PDB structures: RCSB PDB PDBe PDBsum
- Gene Ontology: AmiGO / QuickGO
Search
- PMC: articles
- PubMed: articles
- NCBI: proteins

In enzymology, a mRNA (2'-O-methyladenosine-N^{6}-)-methyltransferase (EC 2.1.1.62) is an enzyme that catalyzes the chemical reaction

S-adenosyl-L-methionine + m^{7}G(5')pppAm $\rightleftharpoons$ S-adenosyl-L-homocysteine + m^{7}G(5')pppm^{6}Am (mRNA containing an N^{6},2'-O-dimethyladenosine cap)

Thus, the two substrates of this enzyme are S-adenosyl methionine and m^{7}G(5')pppAm, whereas its two products are S-adenosylhomocysteine and m^{7}G(5')pppm^{6}Am (mRNA containing an N^{6},2'-O-dimethyladenosine cap).

This enzyme belongs to the family of transferases, specifically those transferring one-carbon group methyltransferases. The systematic name of this enzyme class is S-adenosyl-L-methionine:mRNA (2'-O-methyladenosine-N^{6}-)-methyltransferase. Other names in common use include messenger ribonucleate 2'-O-methyladenosine NG-methyltransferase, S-adenosyl-L-methionine:mRNA, and (2'-O-methyladenosine-6-N-)-methyltransferase.
