= Protein methyltransferase II =

Protein methyltransferase II may refer to:

- Histone methyltransferase
- Protein-glutamate O-methyltransferase
