= 4-Dimethylallyltryptophan N-methyltransferase =

Class of enzymes

4-dimethylallyltryptophan N-methyltransferase

Identifiers
- EC no.: 2.1.1.261

Databases
- IntEnz: IntEnz view
- BRENDA: BRENDA entry
- ExPASy: NiceZyme view
- KEGG: KEGG entry
- MetaCyc: metabolic pathway
- PRIAM: profile
- PDB structures: RCSB PDB PDBe PDBsum
Search
- PMC: articles
- PubMed: articles
- NCBI: proteins

4-dimethylallyltryptophan N-methyltransferase (EC 2.1.1.261, fgaMT (gene), easF (gene)) is an enzyme with systematic name S-adenosyl-L-methionine:4-(3-methylbut-2-enyl)-L-tryptophan N-methyltransferase. It catalyses the following chemical reaction

4-(3-methylbut-2-enyl)-L-tryptophan
+ SAM
4-dimethylallyl-L-abrine
+ SAH

This is a methylation reaction in which the methyl group comes from the cofactor, S-adenosyl methionine (SAM), which becomes S-adenosyl-L-homocysteine (SAH). The enzyme was characterised from Aspergillus fumigatus. It catalyses a step in the pathway leading to biosynthesis of ergot alkaloids in that fungus.
