= RRNA (guanine-N2-)-methyltransferase =

rRNA (guanine-N2-)-methyltransferase

Identifiers
- EC no.: 2.1.1.52
- CAS no.: 50812-26-5

Databases
- IntEnz: IntEnz view
- BRENDA: BRENDA entry
- ExPASy: NiceZyme view
- KEGG: KEGG entry
- MetaCyc: metabolic pathway
- PRIAM: profile
- PDB structures: RCSB PDB PDBe PDBsum
- Gene Ontology: AmiGO / QuickGO
Search
- PMC: articles
- PubMed: articles
- NCBI: proteins

In enzymology, a rRNA (guanine-N2-)-methyltransferase (EC 2.1.1.52) is an enzyme that catalyzes the chemical reaction

S-adenosyl-L-methionine + rRNA $\rightleftharpoons$ S-adenosyl-L-homocysteine + rRNA containing N_{2}-methylguanine

Thus, the two substrates of this enzyme are S-adenosyl methionine and rRNA, whereas its two products are S-adenosylhomocysteine and rRNA containing N2-methylguanine.

This enzyme belongs to the family of transferases, specifically those transferring one-carbon group methyltransferases. The systematic name of this enzyme class is S-adenosyl-L-methionine:rRNA (guanine-N2-)-methyltransferase. Other names in common use include ribosomal ribonucleate guanine-2-methyltransferase, and S-adenosyl-L-methionine:rRNA (guanine-2-N-)-methyltransferase.

== Structural studies ==
As of late 2007, only one structure has been solved for this class of enzymes, with the PDB accession code 2PJD.
