= Sterigmatocystin 8-O-methyltransferase =

Sterigmatocystin 7-O-methyltransferase

Identifiers
- EC no.: 2.1.1.110
- CAS no.: 116958-29-3

Databases
- IntEnz: IntEnz view
- BRENDA: BRENDA entry
- ExPASy: NiceZyme view
- KEGG: KEGG entry
- MetaCyc: metabolic pathway
- PRIAM: profile
- PDB structures: RCSB PDB PDBe PDBsum
- Gene Ontology: AmiGO / QuickGO
Search
- PMC: articles
- PubMed: articles
- NCBI: proteins

Sterigmatocystin 8-O-methyltransferase (EC 2.1.1.110) is an enzyme that catalyzes the chemical reaction

sterigmatocystin
+ SAM
8-O-methylsterigmatocystin
+ SAH

This is a methylation reaction in which the aflatoxin, sterigmatocystin, is converted to its methyl ether, 8-O-methylsterigmatocystin. The methyl group comes from the cofactor, S-adenosyl methionine (SAM), which becomes S-adenosyl-L-homocysteine (SAH). The enzyme was characterised from Aspergillus parasiticus.

Aflatoxin B1

This enzyme belongs to the family of transferases, specifically those transferring one-carbon group methyltransferases. The systematic name of this enzyme class is S-adenosyl-L-methionine:sterigmatocystin 8-O-methyltransferase. Other names in common use include sterigmatocystin methyltransferase, O-methyltransferase II, sterigmatocystin 7-O-methyltransferase (incorrect), S-adenosyl-L-methionine:sterigmatocystin 7-O-methyltransferase, and (incorrect). It is part of the biosynthetic pathway to aflatoxin B1.
