= Diphthine synthase =

Class of enzymes

diphthine synthase

Identifiers
- EC no.: 2.1.1.98
- CAS no.: 114514-25-9

Databases
- IntEnz: IntEnz view
- BRENDA: BRENDA entry
- ExPASy: NiceZyme view
- KEGG: KEGG entry
- MetaCyc: metabolic pathway
- PRIAM: profile
- PDB structures: RCSB PDB PDBe PDBsum
- Gene Ontology: AmiGO / QuickGO
Search
- PMC: articles
- PubMed: articles
- NCBI: proteins

In enzymology, a diphthine synthase (EC 2.1.1.98) is an enzyme that catalyzes the chemical reaction

S-adenosyl-L-methionine + 2-(3-carboxy-3-aminopropyl)-L-histidine $\rightleftharpoons$ S-adenosyl-L-homocysteine + 2-[3-carboxy-3-(methylammonio)propyl]-L-histidine

Thus, the two substrates of this enzyme are S-adenosyl methionine and 2-(3-carboxy-3-aminopropyl)-L-histidine, whereas its two products are S-adenosylhomocysteine and [[2-[3-carboxy-3-(methylammonio)propyl]-L-histidine]].

This enzyme belongs to the family of transferases, specifically those transferring one-carbon group methyltransferases. The systematic name of this enzyme class is S-adenosyl-L-methionine:2-(3-carboxy-3-aminopropyl)-L-histidine methyltransferase. Other names in common use include S-adenosyl-L-methionine:elongation factor 2 methyltransferase, and diphthine methyltransferase.

== Structural studies ==
As of late 2007, 84 structures have been solved for this class of enzymes, with PDB accession codes 1VCE, 1VHV, 1WDE, 1WNG, 2DEK, 2DSG, 2DSH, 2DSI, 2DV3, 2DV4, 2DV5, 2DV7, 2DXV, 2DXW, 2DXX, 2E07, 2E08, 2E15, 2E16, 2E17, 2E4N, 2E4R, 2E7R, 2E8H, 2E8Q, 2E8R, 2E8S, 2ED3, 2ED5, 2EEQ, 2EGB, 2EGL, 2EGS, 2EH2, 2EH4, 2EH5, 2EHC, 2EHL, 2EJJ, 2EJK, 2EJZ, 2EK2, 2EK3, 2EK4, 2EK7, 2EKA, 2EL0, 2EL1, 2EL2, 2EL3, 2ELD, 2ELE, 2EMR, 2EMU, 2EN5, 2ENI, 2HR8, 2HUQ, 2HUT, 2HUV, 2HUX, 2OWF, 2OWG, 2OWK, 2OWU, 2OWV, 2P2X, 2P5C, 2P5F, 2P6D, 2P6I, 2P6K, 2P6L, 2P9D, 2PB4, 2PB5, 2PB6, 2PCA, 2PCG, 2PCH, 2PCI, 2PCK, 2PCM, and 2Z6R.
