= Mycinamicin VI 2''-O-methyltransferase =

Class of enzymes

Identifiers
- EC no.: 2.1.1.238

Databases
- IntEnz: IntEnz view
- BRENDA: BRENDA entry
- ExPASy: NiceZyme view
- KEGG: KEGG entry
- MetaCyc: metabolic pathway
- PRIAM: profile
- PDB structures: RCSB PDB PDBe PDBsum
Search
- PMC: articles
- PubMed: articles
- NCBI: proteins

Mycinamicin VI 2''-O-methyltransferase (EC 2.1.1.238, MycE) is an enzyme with systematic name S-adenosyl-L-methionine:mycinamicin VI 2''-O-methyltransferase. This enzyme catalyses the following chemical reaction:

S-adenosyl-L-methionine + mycinamicin VI $\rightleftharpoons$ S-adenosyl-L-homocysteine + mycinamicin III

The enzyme is involved in the biosynthesis of mycinamicin macrolide antibiotics.
