= TRNA1Val (adenine37-N6)-methyltransferase =

TRNA1Val (adenine^{37}-N^{6})-methyltransferase

Identifiers
- EC no.: 2.1.1.223

Databases
- IntEnz: IntEnz view
- BRENDA: BRENDA entry
- ExPASy: NiceZyme view
- KEGG: KEGG entry
- MetaCyc: metabolic pathway
- PRIAM: profile
- PDB structures: RCSB PDB PDBe PDBsum
Search
- PMC: articles
- PubMed: articles
- NCBI: proteins

TRNA1Val (adenine^{37}-N^{6})-methyltransferase (EC 2.1.1.223, YfiC) is an enzyme with systematic name S-adenosyl-L-methionine:tRNA1Val (adenine^{37}-N^{6})-methyltransferase. This enzyme catalyses the following chemical reaction

S-adenosyl-L-methionine + adenine^{37} in tRNA1Val $\rightleftharpoons$ S-adenosyl-L-homocysteine + N^{6}-methyladenine^{37} in tRNA1Val

The enzyme specifically methylates adenine^{37} in tRNA1Val (anticodon cmo5UAC).
