= Phenol O-methyltransferase =

Class of enzymes

Identifiers
- EC no.: 2.1.1.25
- CAS no.: 37256-94-3

Databases
- IntEnz: IntEnz view
- BRENDA: BRENDA entry
- ExPASy: NiceZyme view
- KEGG: KEGG entry
- MetaCyc: metabolic pathway
- PRIAM: profile
- PDB structures: RCSB PDB PDBe PDBsum
- Gene Ontology: AmiGO / QuickGO
Search
- PMC: articles
- PubMed: articles
- NCBI: proteins

Phenol O-methyltransferase (EC 2.1.1.25) is an enzyme that catalyzes the chemical reaction

phenol
+ SAM
anisole
+ SAH

This is a methylation reaction in which phenol is converted to anisole. The methyl group comes from the cofactor, S-adenosyl methionine (SAM), which loses its methyl group and becomes S-adenosyl-L-homocysteine (SAH).

This enzyme belongs to the family of transferases, specifically those transferring one-carbon group methyltransferases. The systematic name of this enzyme class is S-adenosyl-L-methionine:phenol O-methyltransferase. It is also called PMT and can convert other substituted phenols to their corresponding methyl ethers.
