= 2,7,4'-Trihydroxyisoflavanone 4'-O-methyltransferase =

Class of enzymes

Identifiers
- EC no.: 2.1.1.212

Databases
- IntEnz: IntEnz view
- BRENDA: BRENDA entry
- ExPASy: NiceZyme view
- KEGG: KEGG entry
- MetaCyc: metabolic pathway
- PRIAM: profile
- PDB structures: RCSB PDB PDBe PDBsum
Search
- PMC: articles
- PubMed: articles
- NCBI: proteins

2,7,4'-Trihydroxyisoflavanone 4'-O-methyltransferase (EC 2.1.1.212, SAM:2,7,4'-trihydroxyisoflavanone 4'-O-methyltransferase, HI4'OMT, HMM1, MtIOMT5) is an enzyme with systematic name S-adenosyl-L-methionine:2,7,4'-trihydroxyisoflavanone 4'-O-methyltransferase. This enzyme catalyses the following chemical reaction

2,4',7-trihydroxyisoflavanone
+ SAM
2,7-dihydroxy-4'-methoxyisoflavanone
+ SAH

This is a methylation reaction in which the isoflavanone, 2,4',7-trihydroxyisoflavanone, is converted a specific methyl ether, 2,7-dihydroxy-4'-methoxyisoflavanone. The methyl group comes from the cofactor, S-adenosyl methionine (SAM), which becomes S-adenosyl-L-homocysteine (SAH). The enzyme was characterised from the legume, Medicago truncatula.
