= CHMT =

CHMT may refer to:

- CHMT-FM, a radio station
- Isoliquiritigenin 2'-O-methyltransferase, an enzyme
