= TRNA (guanine10-N2)-methyltransferase =

TRNA (guanine^{10}-N^{2})-methyltransferase

Identifiers
- EC no.: 2.1.1.214

Databases
- IntEnz: IntEnz view
- BRENDA: BRENDA entry
- ExPASy: NiceZyme view
- KEGG: KEGG entry
- MetaCyc: metabolic pathway
- PRIAM: profile
- PDB structures: RCSB PDB PDBe PDBsum
Search
- PMC: articles
- PubMed: articles
- NCBI: proteins

TRNA (guanine^{10}-N^{2})-methyltransferase (EC 2.1.1.214, (m2G10) methyltransferase, Trm11-Trm112 complex) is an enzyme with systematic name S-adenosyl-L-methionine:tRNA (guanine^{10}-N^{2})-methyltransferase. This enzyme catalyses the following chemical reaction

S-adenosyl-L-methionine + guanine^{10} in tRNA $\rightleftharpoons$ S-adenosyl-L-homocysteine + N^{2}-methylguanine^{10} in tRNA

tRNA (guanine^{10}-N^{2})-methyltransferase from yeast does not catalyse the methylation from N^{2}-methylguanine^{10} to N^{2}-dimethylguanine^{10} in tRNA.
