= Kaempferide =

- Kaempferide structure

Names
- IUPAC name 3,5,7-Trihydroxy-4′-methoxyflavone
- Systematic IUPAC name 3,5,7-Trihydroxy-2-(4-methoxyphenyl)-4H-1-benzopyran-4-one
- Other names Kaempferid; 4′-Methylkaempferol; Kaempferol 4′-methyl ether 4′-O-Methylkaempferol

Identifiers
CAS Number	491-54-3
3D model (JSmol)	Interactive image; Interactive image
ChEBI	CHEBI:6099
ChEMBL	ChEMBL40919
ChemSpider	4444985
ECHA InfoCard	100.007.036
KEGG	C10098
PubChem CID	5281666
UNII	508XL61MPD
CompTox Dashboard (EPA)	DTXSID9034155
- InChI: InChI=1S/C16H12O6/c1-21-10-4-2-8(3-5-10)16-15(20)14(19)13-11(18)6-9(17)7-12(13)22-16/h2-7,17-18,20H,1H3 Key: SQFSKOYWJBQGKQ-UHFFFAOYSA-N; InChI=1/C16H12O6/c1-21-10-4-2-8(3-5-10)16-15(20)14(19)13-11(18)6-9(17)7-12(13)22-16/h2-7,17-18,20H,1H3 Key: SQFSKOYWJBQGKQ-UHFFFAOYAC
- SMILES: COC1=CC=C(C=C1)C2=C(C(=O)C3=C(C=C(C=C3O2)O)O)O; COC1=CC=C(C=C1)C2=C(C(=O)C3=C(C=C(C=C3O2)O)O)O

Properties
Chemical formula	C_{16}H_{12}O_{6}
Molar mass	300.26 g/mol
- Except where otherwise noted, data are given for materials in their standard state (at 25 °C [77 °F], 100 kPa). verify (what is ?) Infobox references

Kaempferide is an O-methylated flavonol, a type of chemical compound. It can be found in Kaempferia galanga (aromatic ginger). It has been noted to inhibit pancreatic cancer growth by blockading an EGFR-related pathway.

== Metabolism ==
The enzyme kaempferol 4'-O-methyltransferase uses S-adenosyl-L-methionine and kaempferol to produce S-adenosyl-L-homocysteine and kaempferide.

== Glycosides ==
Icariin is the tert-amyl alcohol derivative of kaempferide 3,7-O-diglycoside.
