= DTDP-3-amino-3,6-dideoxy-alpha-D-galactopyranose N,N-dimethyltransferase =

Identifiers
- EC no.: 2.1.1.236

Databases
- IntEnz: IntEnz view
- BRENDA: BRENDA entry
- ExPASy: NiceZyme view
- KEGG: KEGG entry
- MetaCyc: metabolic pathway
- PRIAM: profile
- PDB structures: RCSB PDB PDBe PDBsum
Search
- PMC: articles
- PubMed: articles
- NCBI: proteins

DTDP-3-amino-3,6-dideoxy-alpha-D-galactopyranose N,N-dimethyltransferase (EC 2.1.1.236, RavNMT) is an enzyme with systematic name S-adenosyl-L-methionine:dTDP-3-amino-3,6-dideoxy-alpha-D-galactopyranose 3-N,N-dimethyltransferase. This enzyme catalyses the following chemical reaction

2 S-adenosyl-L-methionine + dTDP-3-amino-3,6-dideoxy-alpha-D-galactopyranose $\rightleftharpoons$ 2 S-adenosyl-L-homocysteine + dTDP-3-dimethylamino-3,6-dideoxy-alpha-D-galactopyranose

The enzyme is involved in the synthesis of dTDP-D-ravidosamine.
