= HMM1 =

HMM1 may refer to:

- Heroes of Might and Magic: A Strategic Quest, a video game
- 2,7,4'-Trihydroxyisoflavanone 4'-O-methyltransferase, an enzyme
