= 16S rRNA (guanine1516-N2)-methyltransferase =

Class of enzymes

16S rRNA (guanine^{1516}-N^{2})-methyltransferase

Identifiers
- EC no.: 2.1.1.242

Databases
- IntEnz: IntEnz view
- BRENDA: BRENDA entry
- ExPASy: NiceZyme view
- KEGG: KEGG entry
- MetaCyc: metabolic pathway
- PRIAM: profile
- PDB structures: RCSB PDB PDBe PDBsum
Search
- PMC: articles
- PubMed: articles
- NCBI: proteins

16S rRNA (guanine^{1516}-N^{2})-methyltransferase (EC 2.1.1.242, yhiQ (gene), rsmJ (gene), m2G1516 methyltransferase) is an enzyme with systematic name S-adenosyl-L-methionine:16S rRNA (guanine^{1516}-N^{2})-methyltransferase. This enzyme catalyses the following chemical reaction

S-adenosyl-L-methionine + guanine^{1516} in 16S rRNA $\rightleftharpoons$ S-adenosyl-L-homocysteine + N^{2}-methylguanine^{1516} in 16S rRNA

The enzyme specifically methylates guanine^{1516} at N^{2} in 16S rRNA.
