= TRNA (guanine6-N2)-methyltransferase =

TRNA (guanine^{6}-N^{2})-methyltransferase

Identifiers
- EC no.: 2.1.1.256

Databases
- IntEnz: IntEnz view
- BRENDA: BRENDA entry
- ExPASy: NiceZyme view
- KEGG: KEGG entry
- MetaCyc: metabolic pathway
- PRIAM: profile
- PDB structures: RCSB PDB PDBe PDBsum
Search
- PMC: articles
- PubMed: articles
- NCBI: proteins

TRNA (guanine^{6}-N^{2})-methyltransferase (EC 2.1.1.256, methyltransferase Trm14, m2G6 methyltransferase) is an enzyme with systematic name S-adenosyl-L-methionine:tRNA (guanine^{6}-N^{2})-methyltransferase. This enzyme catalyses the following chemical reaction

S-adenosyl-L-methionine + guanine^{6} in tRNA $\rightleftharpoons$ S-adenosyl-L-homocysteine + N^{2}-methylguanine^{6} in tRNA

The enzyme specifically methylates guanine^{6} at N^{2} in tRNA.
