= Chlorophenol O-methyltransferase =

Identifiers
- EC no.: 2.1.1.136

Databases
- IntEnz: IntEnz view
- BRENDA: BRENDA entry
- ExPASy: NiceZyme view
- KEGG: KEGG entry
- MetaCyc: metabolic pathway
- PRIAM: profile
- PDB structures: RCSB PDB PDBe PDBsum
- Gene Ontology: AmiGO / QuickGO
Search
- PMC: articles
- PubMed: articles
- NCBI: proteins

Chlorophenol O-methyltransferase (EC 2.1.1.136) is an enzyme that catalyzes the chemical reaction

2,4,6-Trichlorophenol
+ SAM
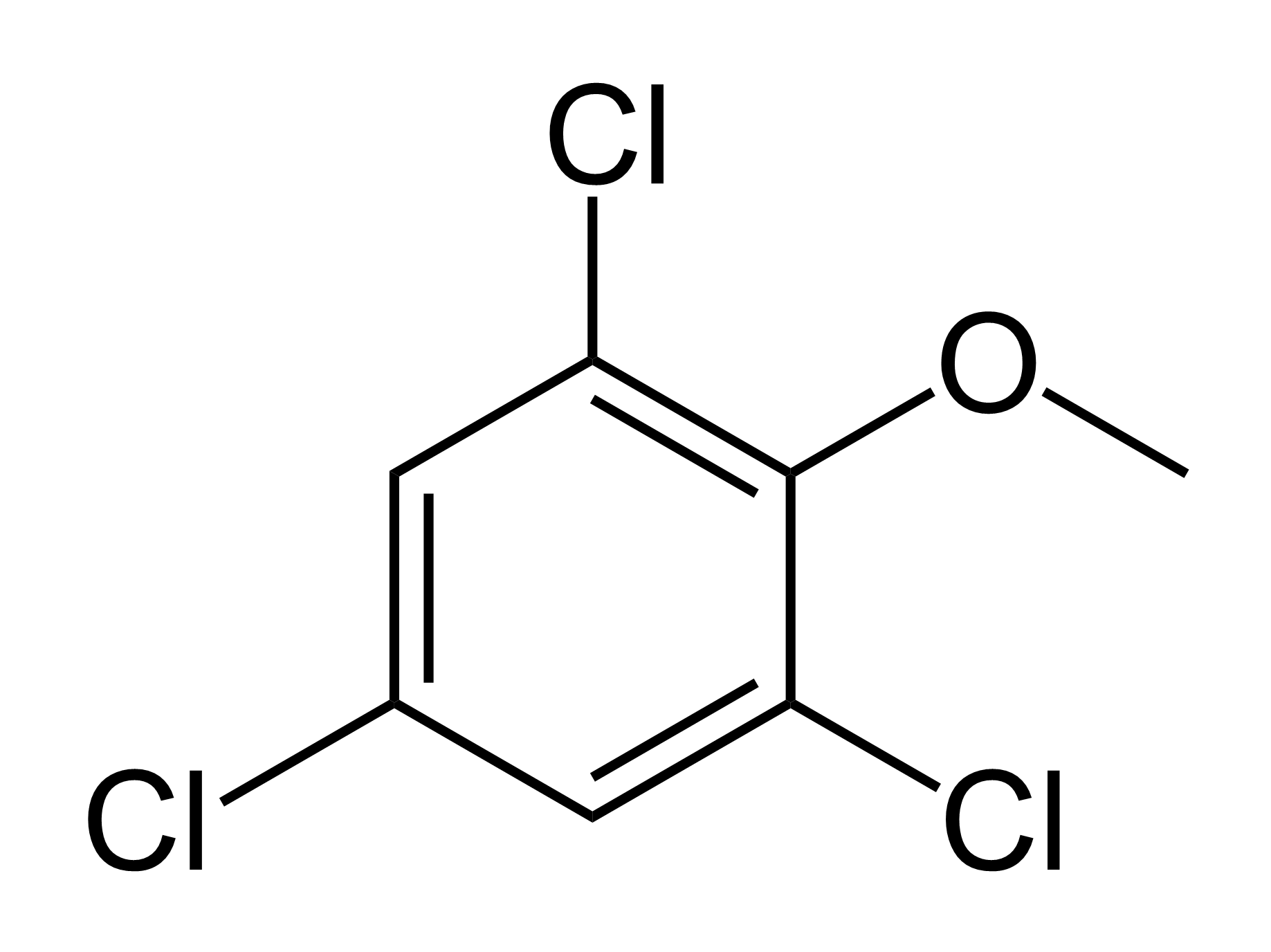
2,4,6-Trichloroanisole
+ SAH

This is a methylation reaction in which 2,4,6-trichlorophenol is converted to 2,4,6-trichloroanisole. The methyl group comes from the cofactor, S-adenosyl methionine (SAM), which becomes S-adenosyl-L-homocysteine (SAH). The enzyme was characterised from the fungal genus Trichoderma.

This enzyme belongs to the family of transferases, specifically those transferring one-carbon group methyltransferases. The systematic name of this enzyme class is S-adenosyl-L-methionine:trichlorophenol O-methyltransferase. Other names in common use include halogenated phenol O-methyltransferase, trichlorophenol, and O-methyltransferase. It methylates a variety of chlorinated phenols.
