= Iodophenol O-methyltransferase =

Identifiers
- EC no.: 2.1.1.26
- CAS no.: 37256-95-4

Databases
- IntEnz: IntEnz view
- BRENDA: BRENDA entry
- ExPASy: NiceZyme view
- KEGG: KEGG entry
- MetaCyc: metabolic pathway
- PRIAM: profile
- PDB structures: RCSB PDB PDBe PDBsum
- Gene Ontology: AmiGO / QuickGO
Search
- PMC: articles
- PubMed: articles
- NCBI: proteins

Iodophenol O-methyltransferase (EC 2.1.1.26) is an enzyme that catalyzes the chemical reaction

2-Iodophenol
+ SAM
2-Iodoanisole
+ SAH

This is a methylation reaction in which 2-iodophenol is converted to 2-iodoanisole. The methyl group comes from the cofactor, S-adenosyl methionine (SAM), which loses its methyl group and becomes S-adenosyl-L-homocysteine (SAH). Other iodophenols are also methylated, with the highest activity being found with 4-hydroxy-3,5-diiodobenzoic acid (ioxynic acid).

This enzyme belongs to the family of transferases, specifically those transferring one-carbon group methyltransferases. The systematic name of this enzyme class is S-adenosyl-L-methionine:2-iodophenol O-methyltransferase.
