= Polysaccharide O-methyltransferase =

Enzyme

polysaccharide O-methyltransferase

Identifiers
- EC no.: 2.1.1.18
- CAS no.: 37205-56-4

Databases
- IntEnz: IntEnz view
- BRENDA: BRENDA entry
- ExPASy: NiceZyme view
- KEGG: KEGG entry
- MetaCyc: metabolic pathway
- PRIAM: profile
- PDB structures: RCSB PDB PDBe PDBsum
- Gene Ontology: AmiGO / QuickGO
Search
- PMC: articles
- PubMed: articles
- NCBI: proteins

In enzymology, a polysaccharide O-methyltransferase (EC 2.1.1.18) is an enzyme that catalyzes the chemical reaction

S-adenosyl-L-methionine + 1,4-alpha-D-glucooligosaccharide $\rightleftharpoons$ S-adenosyl-L-homocysteine + oligosaccharide containing 6-methyl-D-glucose units

Thus, the two substrates of this enzyme are S-adenosyl methionine and 1,4-alpha-D-glucooligosaccharide, whereas its two products are S-adenosylhomocysteine and oligosaccharide containing 6-methyl-D-glucose units. This enzyme belongs to the family of transferases, specifically those transferring one-carbon group methyltransferases. The systematic name of this enzyme class is S-adenosyl-L-methionine:1,4-alpha-D-glucan 6-O-methyltransferase. Other names in common use include polysaccharide methyltransferase, and acylpolysacharide 6-methyltransferase.
