= Macrocin =

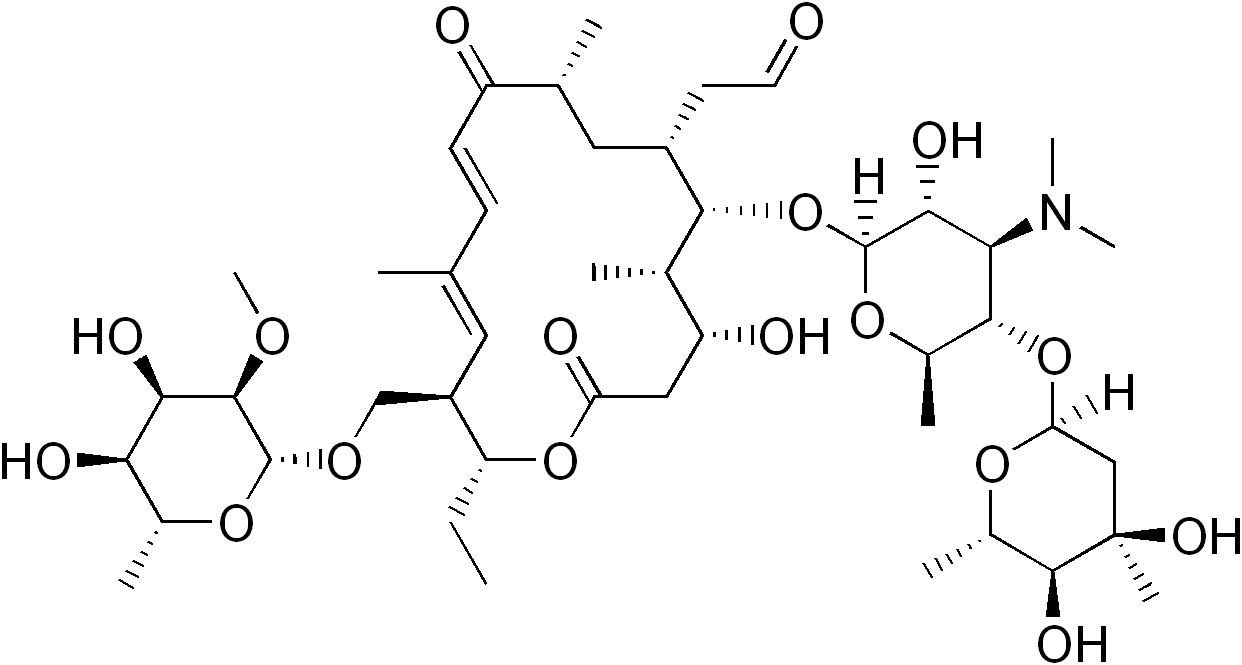

Names
- IUPAC name 2-[(4R,5S,7R,9R,11E,13E,16R)-6-[[(2R,3R,4R,5S,6R)-5-[[(2S,4R,5S,6S)-4,5-dihydroxy-4,6-dimethyl-2-tetrahydropyranyl]oxy]-4-dimethylamino-3-hydroxy-6-methyl-2-tetrahydropyranyl]oxy]-15-[[(2R,3R,4R,5S,6R)-4,5-dihydroxy-3-methoxy-6-methyl-2-tetrahydropyranyl]oxymethyl]-16-ethyl-4-hydroxy-5,9,13-trimethyl-2,10-dioxo-1-oxacyclohexadeca-11,13-dien-7-yl]acetaldehyde
- Other names Tylosin C

Identifiers
| CAS Number | 11049-15-3 |
| 3D model (JSmol) | Interactive image |
| ChEBI | CHEBI:17371 |
| ChemSpider | 4444064 |
| PubChem CID | 6440817 |
- InChI: InChI=1S/C45H75NO17/c1-12-32-29(21-57-44-41(56-11)38(53)36(51)25(5)59-44)17-22(2)13-14-30(48)23(3)18-28(15-16-47)39(24(4)31(49)19-33(50)61-32)63-43-37(52)35(46(9)10)40(26(6)60-43)62-34-20-45(8,55)42(54)27(7)58-34/h13-14,16-17,23-29,31-32,34-44,49,51-55H,12,15,18-21H2,1-11H3/b14-13+,22-17+/t23-,24+,25-,26-,27+,28+,29-,31-,32-,34+,35-,36-,37-,38-,39-,40-,41-,42+,43+,44-,45-/m1/s1 Key: UFUYRGNJTFAODM-HQCAVAADSA-N; InChI=1/C45H75NO17/c1-12-32-29(21-57-44-41(56-11)38(53)36(51)25(5)59-44)17-22(2)13-14-30(48)23(3)18-28(15-16-47)39(24(4)31(49)19-33(50)61-32)63-43-37(52)35(46(9)10)40(26(6)60-43)62-34-20-45(8,55)42(54)27(7)58-34/h13-14,16-17,23-29,31-32,34-44,49,51-55H,12,15,18-21H2,1-11H3/b14-13+,22-17+/t23-,24+,25-,26-,27+,28+,29-,31-,32-,34+,35-,36-,37-,38-,39-,40-,41-,42+,43+,44-,45-/m1/s1 Key: UFUYRGNJTFAODM-HQCAVAADBQ
- SMILES: C[C@H]([C@@H](O[C@]2([H])O[C@H](C)[C@@H](O[C@]4([H])O[C@@H](C)[C@H](O)[C@@](O)(C)C4)[C@H](N(C)C)[C@H]2O)[C@@H](CC=O)C[C@H]1C)[C@H](O)CC(O[C@H](CC)[C@@H](CO[C@H]3[C@H](OC)[C@H](O)[C@H](O)[C@@H](C)O3)/C=C(C)/C=C/C1=O)=O

Properties
| Chemical formula | C_{45}H_{75}NO_{17} |
| Molar mass | 902.07 g/mol |
- Except where otherwise noted, data are given for materials in their standard state (at 25 °C [77 °F], 100 kPa). verify (what is ?) Infobox references

Macrocin is a macrolide antibiotic. Biosynthetically, it is produced from demethylmacrocin by demethylmacrocin O-methyltransferase and is converted to tylosin, an antibiotic used in veterinary medicine, by macrocin O-methyltransferase.
