= 12-hydroxydihydrochelirubine 12-O-methyltransferase =

Class of enzymes

Identifiers
- EC no.: 2.1.1.120
- CAS no.: 158736-40-4

Databases
- IntEnz: IntEnz view
- BRENDA: BRENDA entry
- ExPASy: NiceZyme view
- KEGG: KEGG entry
- MetaCyc: metabolic pathway
- PRIAM: profile
- PDB structures: RCSB PDB PDBe PDBsum
- Gene Ontology: AmiGO / QuickGO
Search
- PMC: articles
- PubMed: articles
- NCBI: proteins

12-hydroxydihydrochelirubine 12-O-methyltransferase (EC 2.1.1.120) is an enzyme that catalyzes the chemical reaction

12-hydroxydihydrochelirubine
+ SAM
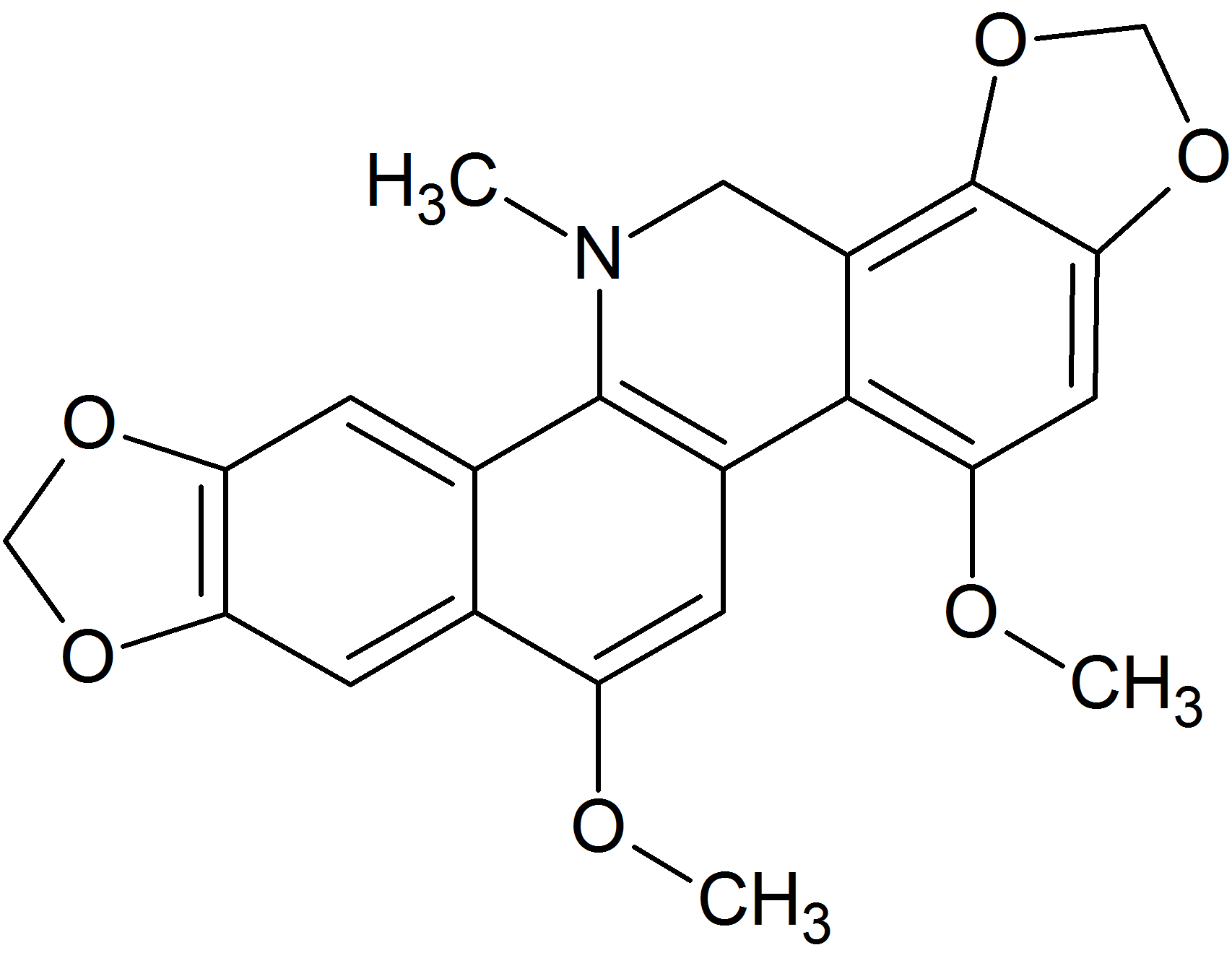
dihydromacarpine
+ SAH

This is a methylation reaction in which the benzylisoquinoline alkaloid, 12-hydroxydihydrochelirubine, is converted to dihydromacarpine. The methyl group comes from the cofactor, S-adenosyl methionine (SAM), which becomes S-adenosyl-L-homocysteine (SAH). The enzyme was characterised from Thalictrum bulgaricum.

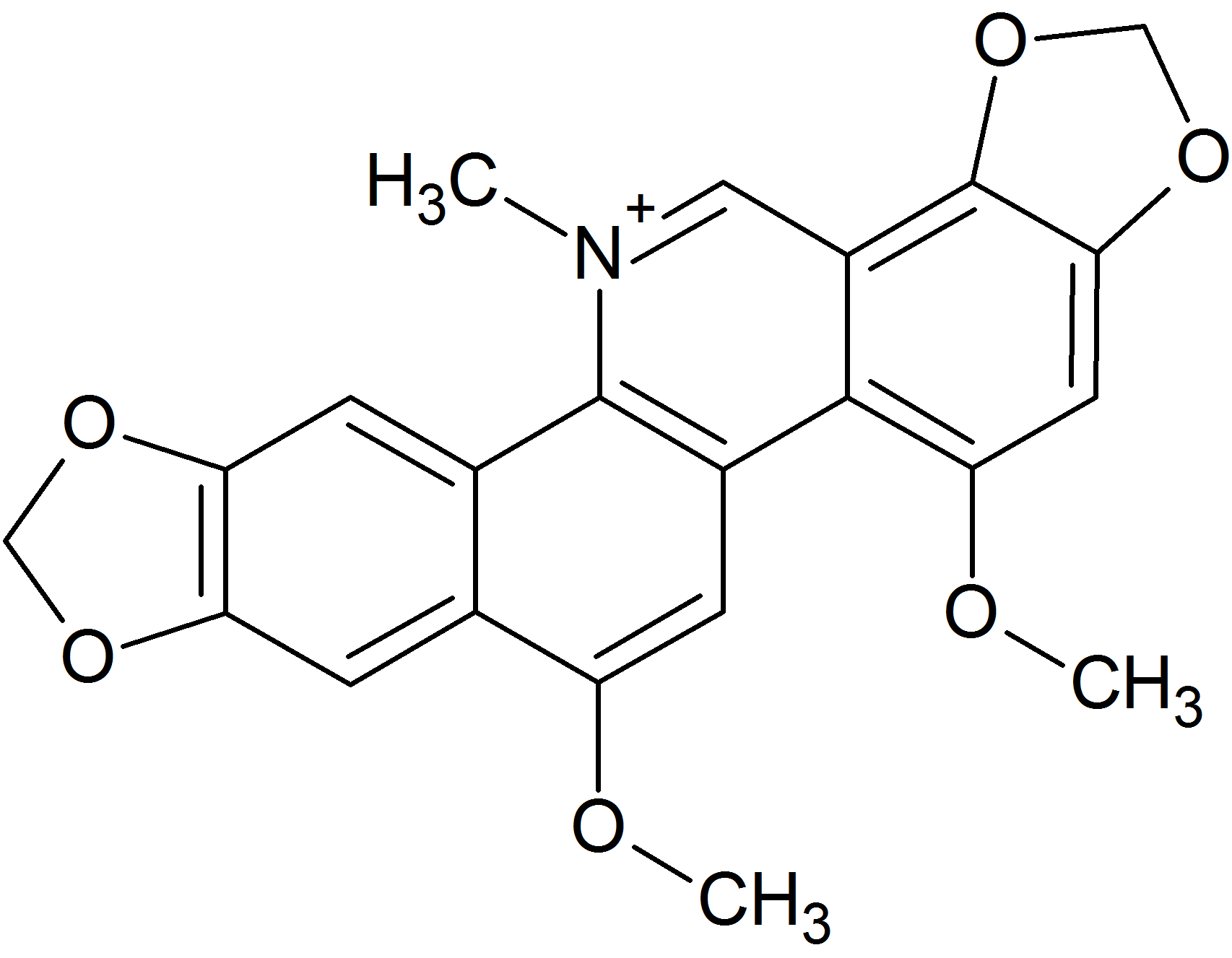
Macarpine

This enzyme belongs to the family of transferases, specifically those transferring one-carbon group methyltransferases. The systematic name of this enzyme class is S-adenosyl-L-methionine:12-hydroxydihydrochelirubine 12-O-methyltransferase. The reaction is a late step in the biosynthesis of benzophenanthridine alkaloid, macarpine.
