= Protein-S-isoprenylcysteine O-methyltransferase =

ICMT

Identifiers
- Symbol: ICMT
- Pfam: PF04140
- Pfam clan: CL0115
- InterPro: IPR007269
- OPM superfamily: 159
- OPM protein: 4a2n
Available protein structures:
- PDB: IPR007269 PF04140 (ECOD; PDBsum)
- AlphaFold: IPR007269; PF04140

protein-S-isoprenylcysteine O-methyltransferase

Identifiers
- EC no.: 2.1.1.100
- CAS no.: 130731-20-3

Databases
- BRENDA: enzyme data
- ExPASy: NiceZyme view
- KEGG: enzyme entry
- MetaCyc: metabolic pathway
- Rhea: reactions
- PDB structures: RCSB PDB PDBe PDBsum
- Gene Ontology: AmiGO / QuickGO
Search
- PMC: articles
- PubMed: articles
- NCBI: proteins

The isoprenylcysteine o-methyltransferase (EC 2.1.1.100) carries out carboxyl methylation of cleaved eukaryotic proteins that terminate in a CaaX motif. In Saccharomyces cerevisiae (Baker's yeast) this methylation is carried out by Ste14p, an integral endoplasmic reticulum membrane protein. Ste14p is the founding member of the isoprenylcysteine carboxyl methyltransferase (ICMT) family, whose members share significant sequence homology.

The enzyme catalyzes the chemical reaction

S-adenosyl-L-methionine + protein C-terminal S-farnesyl-L-cysteine $\rightleftharpoons$ S-adenosyl-L-homocysteine + protein C-terminal S-farnesyl-L-cysteine methyl ester

Thus, the two substrates of this enzyme are S-adenosyl methionine and protein C-terminal S-farnesyl-L-cysteine, whereas its two products are S-adenosylhomocysteine and protein C-terminal S-farnesyl-L-cysteine methyl ester.
