= 23S rRNA (adenosine1067-2'-O)-methyltransferase =

Class of enzymes

23S rRNA (adenosine^{1067}-2'-O)-methyltransferase

Identifiers
- EC no.: 2.1.1.230

Databases
- IntEnz: IntEnz view
- BRENDA: BRENDA entry
- ExPASy: NiceZyme view
- KEGG: KEGG entry
- MetaCyc: metabolic pathway
- PRIAM: profile
- PDB structures: RCSB PDB PDBe PDBsum
Search
- PMC: articles
- PubMed: articles
- NCBI: proteins

23S rRNA (adenosine^{1067}-2'-O)-methyltransferase (EC 2.1.1.230, 23S rRNA A1067 2'-methyltransferase, thiostrepton-resistance methylase, nosiheptide-resistance methyltransferase) is an enzyme with systematic name S-adenosyl-L-methionine:23S rRNA (adenosine^{1067}-2'-O)-methyltransferase. This enzyme catalyses the following chemical reaction

S-adenosyl-L-methionine + adenosine^{1067} in 23S rRNA $\rightleftharpoons$ S-adenosyl-L-homocysteine + 2'-O-methyladenosine^{1067} in 23S rRNA

The methylase that is responsible for autoimmunity in the thiostrepton producer Streptomyces azureus.
