= Caffeoyl-CoA O-methyltransferase =

caffeoyl-CoA O-methyltransferase

Identifiers
- EC no.: 2.1.1.104
- CAS no.: 120433-42-3

Databases
- IntEnz: IntEnz view
- BRENDA: BRENDA entry
- ExPASy: NiceZyme view
- KEGG: KEGG entry
- MetaCyc: metabolic pathway
- PRIAM: profile
- PDB structures: RCSB PDB PDBe PDBsum
- Gene Ontology: AmiGO / QuickGO
Search
- PMC: articles
- PubMed: articles
- NCBI: proteins

In enzymology, a caffeoyl-CoA O-methyltransferase (EC 2.1.1.104) is an enzyme that catalyzes the chemical reaction

S-adenosyl-L-methionine + caffeoyl-CoA $\rightleftharpoons$ S-adenosyl-L-homocysteine + feruloyl-CoA

Thus, the two substrates of this enzyme are S-adenosyl methionine and caffeoyl-CoA, whereas its two products are S-adenosylhomocysteine and feruloyl-CoA. A large number of natural products are generated via a step involving this enzyme.

This enzyme is classified to the family of transferases, specifically those transferring one-carbon group methyltransferases. The systematic name of this enzyme class is S-adenosyl-L-methionine:caffeoyl-CoA 3-O-methyltransferase. Other names in common use include caffeoyl coenzyme A methyltransferase, caffeoyl-CoA 3-O-methyltransferase, and trans-caffeoyl-CoA 3-O-methyltransferase. This enzyme participates in phenylpropanoid biosynthesis.

== Structural studies ==
As of late 2007, two structures have been solved for this class of enzymes, with PDB accession codes 1SUI and 1SUS.
