= TRNA (adenine57-N1/adenine58-N1)-methyltransferase =

Class of enzymes

TRNA (adenine^{57}-N^{1}/adenine^{58}-N^{1})-methyltransferase

Identifiers
- EC no.: 2.1.1.219

Databases
- BRENDA: enzyme data
- ExPASy: NiceZyme view
- KEGG: enzyme entry
- MetaCyc: metabolic pathway
- Rhea: reactions
- PDB structures: RCSB PDB PDBe PDBsum
Search
- PMC: articles
- PubMed: articles
- NCBI: proteins

TRNA (adenine^{57}-N^{1}/adenine^{58}-N^{1})-methyltransferase (EC 2.1.1.219, TrmI, PabTrmI, AqTrmI, MtTrmI) is an enzyme with systematic name S-adenosyl-L-methionine:tRNA (adenine^{57}/adenine^{58}-N^{1})-methyltransferase. This enzyme catalyses the following chemical reaction:

2 S-adenosyl-L-methionine + adenine^{57}/adenine^{58} in tRNA $\rightleftharpoons$ 2 S-adenosyl-L-homocysteine + N^{1}-methyladenine^{57}/N^{1}-methyladenine^{58} in tRNA

The enzyme catalyses the formation of N^{1}-methyladenine at two adjacent positions (57 and 58) in the T-loop of certain tRNAs .
