= 10-hydroxydihydrosanguinarine 10-O-methyltransferase =

Class of enzymes

Identifiers
- EC no.: 2.1.1.119
- CAS no.: 144388-39-6

Databases
- IntEnz: IntEnz view
- BRENDA: BRENDA entry
- ExPASy: NiceZyme view
- KEGG: KEGG entry
- MetaCyc: metabolic pathway
- PRIAM: profile
- PDB structures: RCSB PDB PDBe PDBsum
- Gene Ontology: AmiGO / QuickGO
Search
- PMC: articles
- PubMed: articles
- NCBI: proteins

10-hydroxydihydrosanguinarine 10-O-methyltransferase (EC 2.1.1.119) is an enzyme that catalyzes the chemical reaction

10-hydroxydihydrosanguinarine
+ SAM
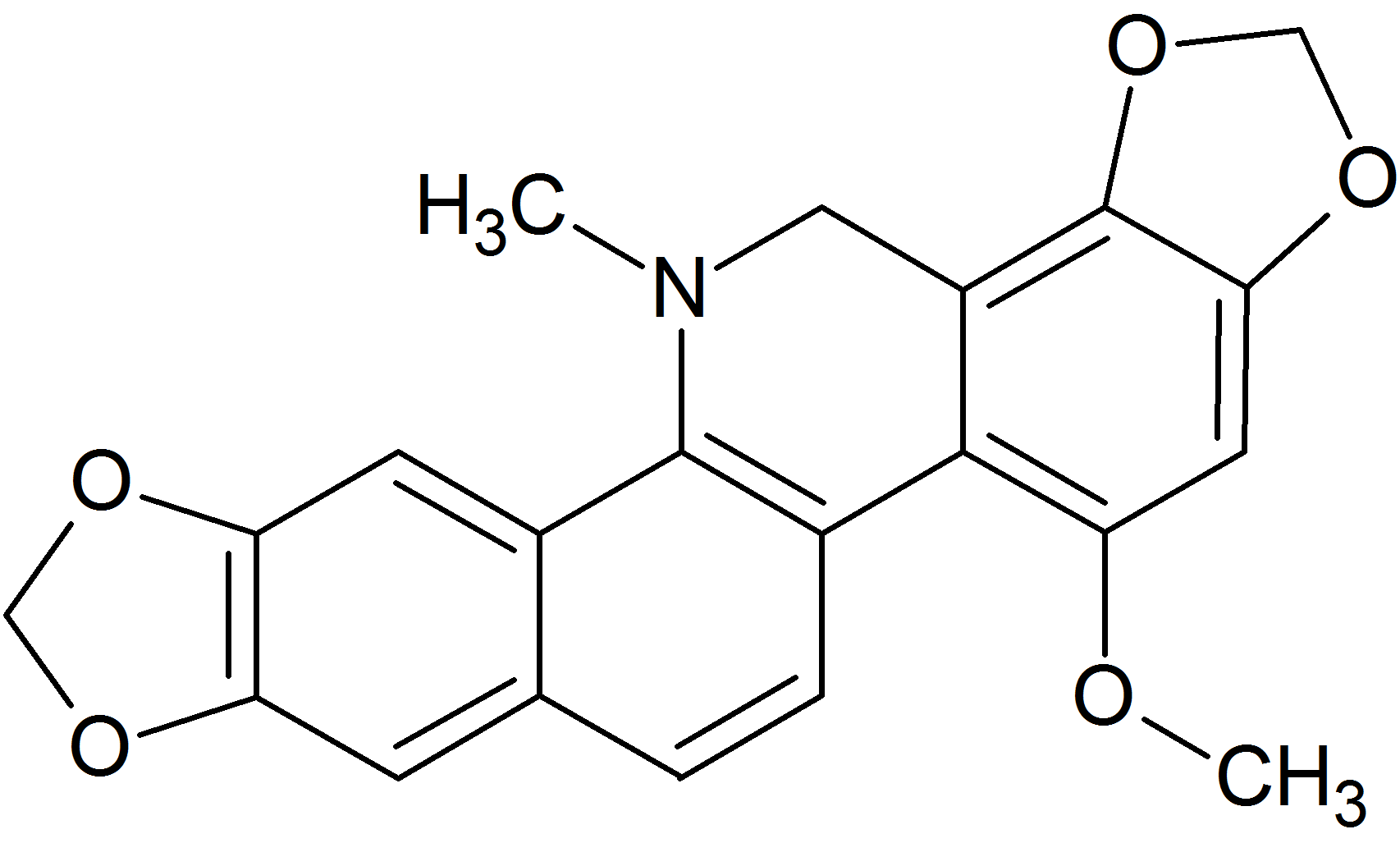
dihydrochelirubine
+ SAH

This is a methylation reaction in which the benzylisoquinoline alkaloid, 10-hydroxydihydrosanguinarine, is converted to dihydrochelirubine. The methyl group comes from the cofactor, S-adenosyl methionine (SAM), which becomes S-adenosyl-L-homocysteine (SAH). The enzyme was characterised from Eschscholtzia californica.

This enzyme belongs to the family of transferases, specifically those transferring one-carbon group methyltransferases. The systematic name of this enzyme class is S-adenosyl-L-methionine:10-hydroxydihydrosanguinarine 10-O-methyltransferase. It is part of the alkaloid biosynthesis pathway.
