= MRNA (nucleoside-2'-O-)-methyltransferase =

Enzyme

mRNA (nucleoside-2'-O-)-methyltransferase

Identifiers
- EC no.: 2.1.1.57
- CAS no.: 61970-02-3

Databases
- IntEnz: IntEnz view
- BRENDA: BRENDA entry
- ExPASy: NiceZyme view
- KEGG: KEGG entry
- MetaCyc: metabolic pathway
- PRIAM: profile
- PDB structures: RCSB PDB PDBe PDBsum
- Gene Ontology: AmiGO / QuickGO
Search
- PMC: articles
- PubMed: articles
- NCBI: proteins

In enzymology, a mRNA (nucleoside-2'-O-)-methyltransferase (EC 2.1.1.57) is an enzyme that catalyzes the chemical reaction

S-adenosyl-L-methionine + m_{7}G(5')pppR-RNA $\rightleftharpoons$ S-adenosyl-L-homocysteine + m_{7}G(5')pppRm-RNA (mRNA containing a 2'-O-methylpurine cap)

Thus, the two substrates of this enzyme are S-adenosyl methionine and m7G(5')pppR-RNA, whereas its two products are S-adenosylhomocysteine and m7G(5')pppRm-RNA (mRNA containing a 2'-O-methylpurine cap).

This enzyme belongs to the family of transferases, specifically those transferring one-carbon group methyltransferases. The systematic name of this enzyme class is S-adenosyl-L-methionine:mRNA (nucleoside-2'-O-)-methyltransferase. Other names in common use include messenger ribonucleate nucleoside 2'-methyltransferase, and messenger RNA (nucleoside-2'-)-methyltransferase.

== Structural studies ==
As of late 2007, two structures have been solved for this class of enzymes, with PDB accession codes 2GA9 and 2GAF.
