= (S)-scoulerine 9-O-methyltransferase =

Class of enzymes

Identifiers
- EC no.: 2.1.1.117

Databases
- IntEnz: IntEnz view
- BRENDA: BRENDA entry
- ExPASy: NiceZyme view
- KEGG: KEGG entry
- MetaCyc: metabolic pathway
- PRIAM: profile
- PDB structures: RCSB PDB PDBe PDBsum
- Gene Ontology: AmiGO / QuickGO
Search
- PMC: articles
- PubMed: articles
- NCBI: proteins

(S)-scoulerine 9-O-methyltransferase (EC 2.1.1.117) is an enzyme that catalyzes the chemical reaction

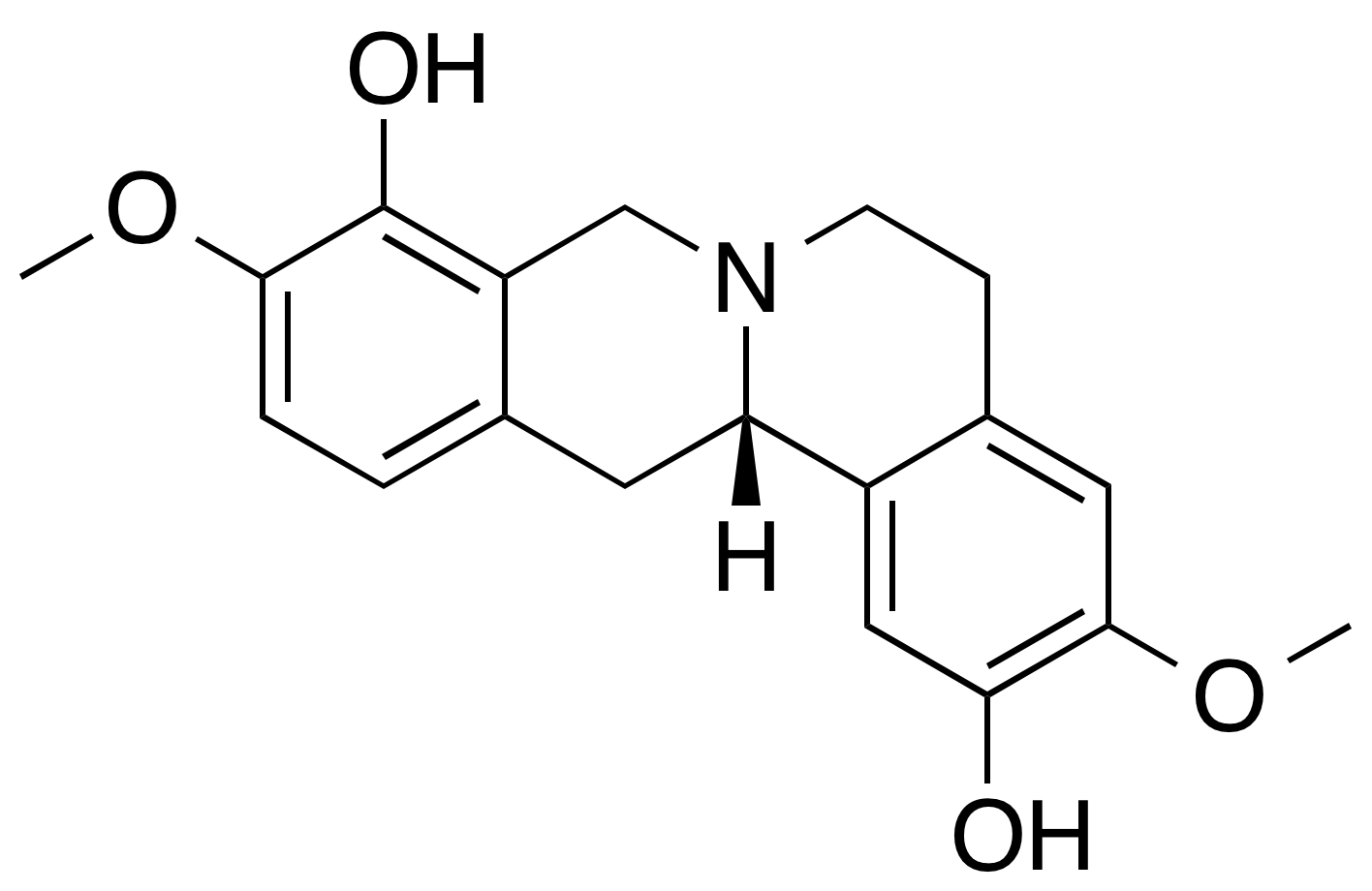
scoulerine
+ SAM
isocorypalmine
+ SAH

This is a methylation reaction in which the benzylisoquinoline alkaloid, (S)-scoulerine, is converted to (S)-isocorypalmine. The methyl group comes from the cofactor, S-adenosyl methionine (SAM), which becomes S-adenosyl-L-homocysteine (SAH). The enzyme was characterised from Berberis wilsoniae.

This enzyme belongs to the family of transferases, specifically those transferring one-carbon group methyltransferases. The systematic name of this enzyme class is S-adenosyl-L-methionine:(S)-scoulerine 9-O-methyltransferase. It is part of the alkaloid biosynthesis pathway.
