= Licodione 2'-O-methyltransferase =

licodione 2'-O-methyltransferase

Identifiers
- EC no.: 2.1.1.65
- CAS no.: 77000-07-8

Databases
- IntEnz: IntEnz view
- BRENDA: BRENDA entry
- ExPASy: NiceZyme view
- KEGG: KEGG entry
- MetaCyc: metabolic pathway
- PRIAM: profile
- PDB structures: RCSB PDB PDBe PDBsum
- Gene Ontology: AmiGO / QuickGO
Search
- PMC: articles
- PubMed: articles
- NCBI: proteins

In enzymology, a licodione 2'-O-methyltransferase (EC 2.1.1.65) is an enzyme that catalyzes the chemical reaction

S-adenosyl-L-methionine + licodione $\rightleftharpoons$ S-adenosyl-L-homocysteine + 2'-O-methyllicodione

Thus, the two substrates of this enzyme are S-adenosyl methionine and licodione, whereas its two products are S-adenosylhomocysteine and 2'-O-methyllicodione.

This enzyme belongs to the family of transferases, specifically those transferring one-carbon group methyltransferases. The systematic name of this enzyme class is S-adenosyl-L-methionine:licodione 2'-O-methyltransferase.
