= Fatty-acid O-methyltransferase =

fatty-acid O-methyltransferase

Identifiers
- EC no.: 2.1.1.15
- CAS no.: 37256-89-6

Databases
- IntEnz: IntEnz view
- BRENDA: BRENDA entry
- ExPASy: NiceZyme view
- KEGG: KEGG entry
- MetaCyc: metabolic pathway
- PRIAM: profile
- PDB structures: RCSB PDB PDBe PDBsum
- Gene Ontology: AmiGO / QuickGO
Search
- PMC: articles
- PubMed: articles
- NCBI: proteins

In enzymology, a fatty-acid O-methyltransferase (EC 2.1.1.15) is an enzyme that catalyzes the chemical reaction

S-adenosyl-L-methionine + a fatty acid $\rightleftharpoons$ S-adenosyl-L-homocysteine + a fatty acid methyl ester

Thus, the two substrates of this enzyme are S-adenosyl methionine and fatty acid, whereas its two products are S-adenosylhomocysteine and fatty acid methyl ester.

This enzyme belongs to the family of transferases, specifically those transferring one-carbon group methyltransferases. The systematic name of this enzyme class is S-adenosyl-L-methionine:fatty-acid O-methyltransferase. Other names in common use include fatty acid methyltransferase, and fatty acid O-methyltransferase.
