= Jasmonate O-methyltransferase =

Identifiers
- EC no.: 2.1.1.141

Databases
- IntEnz: IntEnz view
- BRENDA: BRENDA entry
- ExPASy: NiceZyme view
- KEGG: KEGG entry
- MetaCyc: metabolic pathway
- PRIAM: profile
- PDB structures: RCSB PDB PDBe PDBsum
- Gene Ontology: AmiGO / QuickGO
Search
- PMC: articles
- PubMed: articles
- NCBI: proteins

Jasmonate O-methyltransferase (EC 2.1.1.141) is an enzyme that catalyzes the chemical reaction

jasmonic acid
+ SAM
methyl jasmonate
+ SAH

This is a methylation reaction in which the plant hormone, jasmonic acid, is converted to its ester, methyl jasmonate. The methyl group comes from the cofactor, S-adenosyl methionine (SAM), which becomes S-adenosyl-L-homocysteine (SAH). The enzyme was characterised from Arabidopsis thaliana.

This enzyme belongs to the family of transferases, specifically those transferring one-carbon group methyltransferases. The systematic name of this enzyme class is S-adenosyl-L-methionine:jasmonate O-methyltransferase. This enzyme is also called jasmonic acid carboxyl methyltransferase.
