= Isoliquiritigenin 2'-O-methyltransferase =

Identifiers
- EC no.: 2.1.1.154
- CAS no.: 139317-14-9

Databases
- IntEnz: IntEnz view
- BRENDA: BRENDA entry
- ExPASy: NiceZyme view
- KEGG: KEGG entry
- MetaCyc: metabolic pathway
- PRIAM: profile
- PDB structures: RCSB PDB PDBe PDBsum
Search
- PMC: articles
- PubMed: articles
- NCBI: proteins

Isoliquiritigenin 2'-O-methyltransferase (EC 2.1.1.154) is an enzyme that catalyzes the chemical reaction

isoliquiritigenin
+ SAM
2'-O-methylisoliquiritigenin
+ SAH

This is a methylation reaction in which the chalcone, isoliquiritigenin, is converted to a specific methyl ether, 2'-O-methylisoliquiritigenin. The methyl group comes from the cofactor, S-adenosyl methionine (SAM), which becomes S-adenosyl-L-homocysteine (SAH). The enzyme was characterised from alfalfa.

This enzyme belongs to the family of transferases, specifically those transferring one-carbon group methyltransferases. The systematic name of this enzyme class is S-adenosyl-L-methionine:isoliquiritigenin 2'-O-methyltransferase. Other names in common use include chalcone OMT, and CHMT.
