= N-benzoyl-4-hydroxyanthranilate 4-O-methyltransferase =

Identifiers
- EC no.: 2.1.1.105
- CAS no.: 125498-68-2

Databases
- IntEnz: IntEnz view
- BRENDA: BRENDA entry
- ExPASy: NiceZyme view
- KEGG: KEGG entry
- MetaCyc: metabolic pathway
- PRIAM: profile
- PDB structures: RCSB PDB PDBe PDBsum
- Gene Ontology: AmiGO / QuickGO
Search
- PMC: articles
- PubMed: articles
- NCBI: proteins

In enzymology, a N-benzoyl-4-hydroxyanthranilate 4-O-methyltransferase (EC 2.1.1.105) is an enzyme that catalyzes the chemical reaction

S-adenosyl-L-methionine + N-benzoyl-4-hydroxyanthranilate $\rightleftharpoons$ S-adenosyl-L-homocysteine + N-benzoyl-4-methoxyanthranilate

Thus, the two substrates of this enzyme are S-adenosyl methionine and N-benzoyl-4-hydroxyanthranilate, whereas its two products are S-adenosylhomocysteine and N-benzoyl-4-methoxyanthranilate.

This enzyme belongs to the family of transferases, specifically those transferring one-carbon group methyltransferases. The systematic name of this enzyme class is S-adenosyl-L-methionine:N-benzoyl-4-O-hydroxyanthranilate 4-O-methyltransferase. Other names in common use include N-benzoyl-4-hydroxyanthranilate 4-methyltransferase, and benzoyl-CoA:anthranilate N-benzoyltransferase.
