= Demethylsterigmatocystin 6-O-methyltransferase =

Identifiers
- EC no.: 2.1.1.109
- CAS no.: 123516-47-2

Databases
- IntEnz: IntEnz view
- BRENDA: BRENDA entry
- ExPASy: NiceZyme view
- KEGG: KEGG entry
- MetaCyc: metabolic pathway
- PRIAM: profile
- PDB structures: RCSB PDB PDBe PDBsum
- Gene Ontology: AmiGO / QuickGO
Search
- PMC: articles
- PubMed: articles
- NCBI: proteins

Demethylsterigmatocystin 6-O-methyltransferase (EC 2.1.1.109) is an enzyme that catalyzes the chemical reaction

6-demethylsterigmatocystin
+ SAM
sterigmatocystin
+ SAH

This is a methylation reaction in which 6-demethylsterigmatocystin is converted to the aflatoxin, sterigmatocystin. The methyl group comes from the cofactor, S-adenosyl methionine (SAM), which becomes S-adenosyl-L-homocysteine (SAH). The enzyme was characterised from Aspergillus parasiticus.

This enzyme belongs to the family of transferases, specifically those transferring one-carbon group methyltransferases. The systematic name of this enzyme class is S-adenosyl-L-methionine:6-demethylsterigmatocystin 6-O-methyltransferase. Other names in common use include demethylsterigmatocystin methyltransferase, and O-methyltransferase I.
