= Glucuronoxylan 4-O-methyltransferase =

glucuronoxylan 4-O-methyltransferase

Identifiers
- EC no.: 2.1.1.112
- CAS no.: 123644-79-1

Databases
- IntEnz: IntEnz view
- BRENDA: BRENDA entry
- ExPASy: NiceZyme view
- KEGG: KEGG entry
- MetaCyc: metabolic pathway
- PRIAM: profile
- PDB structures: RCSB PDB PDBe PDBsum
- Gene Ontology: AmiGO / QuickGO
Search
- PMC: articles
- PubMed: articles
- NCBI: proteins

In enzymology, a glucuronoxylan 4-O-methyltransferase (EC 2.1.1.112) is an enzyme that catalyzes the chemical reaction

S-adenosyl-L-methionine + glucuronoxylan D-glucuronate $\rightleftharpoons$ S-adenosyl-L-homocysteine + glucuronoxylan 4-O-methyl-D-glucuronate

Thus, the two substrates of this enzyme are S-adenosyl methionine and glucuronoxylan D-glucuronate, whereas its two products are S-adenosylhomocysteine and glucuronoxylan 4-O-methyl-D-glucuronate.

This enzyme belongs to the family of transferases, specifically those transferring one-carbon group methyltransferases. The systematic name of this enzyme class is S-adenosyl-L-methionine:glucuronoxylan-D-glucuronate 4-O-methyltransferase.
