= Vitexin 2"-O-rhamnoside 7-O-methyltransferase =

Identifiers
- EC no.: 2.1.1.153

Databases
- IntEnz: IntEnz view
- BRENDA: BRENDA entry
- ExPASy: NiceZyme view
- KEGG: KEGG entry
- MetaCyc: metabolic pathway
- PRIAM: profile
- PDB structures: RCSB PDB PDBe PDBsum
Search
- PMC: articles
- PubMed: articles
- NCBI: proteins

In enzymology, a vitexin 2"-O-rhamnoside 7-O-methyltransferase (EC 2.1.1.153) is an enzyme that catalyzes the chemical reaction

S-adenosyl-L-methionine + vitexin 2"-O-beta-L-rhamnoside $\rightleftharpoons$ S-adenosyl-L-homocysteine + 7-O-methylvitexin 2"-O-beta-L-rhamnoside

Thus, the two substrates of this enzyme are S-adenosyl methionine and vitexin 2"-O-beta-L-rhamnoside, whereas its two products are S-adenosylhomocysteine and 7-O-methylvitexin 2"-O-beta-L-rhamnoside.

This enzyme belongs to the family of transferases, specifically those transferring one-carbon group methyltransferases. The systematic name of this enzyme class is S-adenosyl-L-methionine:vitexin-2"-O-beta-L-rhamnoside 7-O-methyltransferase.
