= Demethylmacrocin O-methyltransferase =

demethylmacrocin O-methyltransferase

Identifiers
- EC no.: 2.1.1.102
- CAS no.: 120313-64-6

Databases
- IntEnz: IntEnz view
- BRENDA: BRENDA entry
- ExPASy: NiceZyme view
- KEGG: KEGG entry
- MetaCyc: metabolic pathway
- PRIAM: profile
- PDB structures: RCSB PDB PDBe PDBsum
- Gene Ontology: AmiGO / QuickGO
Search
- PMC: articles
- PubMed: articles
- NCBI: proteins

In enzymology, a demethylmacrocin O-methyltransferase (EC 2.1.1.102) is an enzyme that catalyzes the chemical reaction

S-adenosyl-L-methionine + demethylmacrocin $\rightleftharpoons$ S-adenosyl-L-homocysteine + macrocin

Thus, the two substrates of this enzyme are S-adenosyl methionine and demethylmacrocin, whereas its two products are S-adenosylhomocysteine and macrocin.

This enzyme belongs to the family of transferases, specifically those transferring one-carbon group methyltransferases. The systematic name of this enzyme class is S-adenosyl-L-methionine:demethylmacrocin 2"'-O-methyltransferase. This enzyme is also called demethylmacrocin methyltransferase. This enzyme participates in biosynthesis of 12-, 14- and 16-membered macrolides.
