= O-demethylpuromycin O-methyltransferase =

Identifiers
- EC no.: 2.1.1.38
- CAS no.: 37257-04-8

Databases
- IntEnz: IntEnz view
- BRENDA: BRENDA entry
- ExPASy: NiceZyme view
- KEGG: KEGG entry
- MetaCyc: metabolic pathway
- PRIAM: profile
- PDB structures: RCSB PDB PDBe PDBsum
- Gene Ontology: AmiGO / QuickGO
Search
- PMC: articles
- PubMed: articles
- NCBI: proteins

In enzymology, an O-demethylpuromycin O-methyltransferase (EC 2.1.1.38) is an enzyme that catalyzes the chemical reaction

S-adenosyl-L-methionine + O-demethylpuromycin $\rightleftharpoons$ S-adenosyl-L-homocysteine + puromycin

Thus, the two substrates of this enzyme are S-adenosyl methionine and O-demethylpuromycin, whereas its two products are S-adenosylhomocysteine and puromycin.

This enzyme belongs to the family of transferases, specifically those transferring one-carbon group methyltransferases. The systematic name of this enzyme class is S-adenosyl-L-methionine:O-demethylpuromycin O-methyltransferase. This enzyme is also called O-demethylpuromycin methyltransferase. This enzyme participates in puromycin biosynthesis.
