= Kaempferol 4'-O-methyltransferase =

Identifiers
- EC no.: 2.1.1.155

Databases
- BRENDA: enzyme data
- ExPASy: NiceZyme view
- KEGG: enzyme entry
- MetaCyc: metabolic pathway
- Rhea: reactions
- PDB structures: RCSB PDB PDBe PDBsum
Search
- PMC: articles
- PubMed: articles
- NCBI: proteins

Kaempferol 4'-O-methyltransferase (EC 2.1.1.155) is an enzyme that catalyzes the chemical reaction

kaempferol
+ SAM
kaempferide
+ SAH

This is a methylation reaction in which the plant flavonol, kaempferol, is converted to a specific methyl ether, kaempferide. The methyl group comes from the cofactor, S-adenosyl methionine (SAM), which becomes S-adenosyl-L-homocysteine (SAH). The enzyme was characterised from Dianthus caryophyllus.

This enzyme belongs to the family of transferases, specifically those transferring one-carbon group methyltransferases. The systematic name of this enzyme class is S-adenosyl-L-methionine:kaempferol 4'-O-methyltransferase. Other names in common use include S-adenosyl-L-methionine:flavonoid 4'-O-methyltransferase, and F 4'-OMT.
