= Isobutyraldoxime O-methyltransferase =

Identifiers
- EC no.: 2.1.1.91
- CAS no.: 95471-32-2

Databases
- IntEnz: IntEnz view
- BRENDA: BRENDA entry
- ExPASy: NiceZyme view
- KEGG: KEGG entry
- MetaCyc: metabolic pathway
- PRIAM: profile
- PDB structures: RCSB PDB PDBe PDBsum
- Gene Ontology: AmiGO / QuickGO
Search
- PMC: articles
- PubMed: articles
- NCBI: proteins

Isobutyraldoxime O-methyltransferase (EC 2.1.1.91) is an enzyme that catalyzes the chemical reaction

(E)-2-methylpropanal oxime
+ SAM
(1E)-2-methylpropanal O-methyloxime
+ SAH

This is a methylation reaction in which (E)-2-methylpropanal oxime is converted to (1E)-2-methylpropanal O-methyloxime. The methyl group comes from the cofactor, S-adenosyl methionine (SAM), which becomes S-adenosyl-L-homocysteine (SAH).

This enzyme belongs to the family of transferases, specifically those transferring one-carbon group methyltransferases. The systematic name of this enzyme class is S-adenosyl-L-methionine:2-methylpropanal-oxime O-methyltransferase. Other names in common use include aldoxime methyltransferase, S-adenosylmethionine:aldoxime O-methyltransferase, and aldoxime O-methyltransferase.
