= TRNA guanosine-2'-O-methyltransferase =

tRNA (guanosine-2'-O-)-methyltransferase

Identifiers
- EC no.: 2.1.1.34
- CAS no.: 37257-01-5

Databases
- IntEnz: IntEnz view
- BRENDA: BRENDA entry
- ExPASy: NiceZyme view
- KEGG: KEGG entry
- MetaCyc: metabolic pathway
- PRIAM: profile
- PDB structures: RCSB PDB PDBe PDBsum
- Gene Ontology: AmiGO / QuickGO
Search
- PMC: articles
- PubMed: articles
- NCBI: proteins

In enzymology, a tRNA guanosine-2'-O-methyltransferase (EC 2.1.1.34) is an enzyme that catalyzes the chemical reaction

S-adenosyl-L-methionine + tRNA $\rightleftharpoons$ S-adenosyl-L-homocysteine + tRNA containing 2'-O-methylguanosine

Thus, the two substrates of this enzyme are S-adenosyl methionine and tRNA, whereas its two products are S-adenosylhomocysteine and tRNA containing 2'-O-methylguanosine.

This enzyme belongs to the family of transferases, specifically those transferring one-carbon group methyltransferases. The systematic name of this enzyme class is S-adenosyl-L-methionine:tRNA guanosine-2'-O-methyltransferase. Other names in common use include transfer ribonucleate guanosine 2'-methyltransferase, tRNA guanosine 2'-methyltransferase, tRNA (guanosine 2')-methyltransferase, tRNA (Gm18) 2'-O-methyltransferase, tRNA (Gm18) methyltransferase, tRNA (guanosine-2'-O-)-methyltransferase, and S-adenosyl-L-methionine:tRNA (guanosine-2'-O-)-methyltransferase.

== Structural studies ==
As of late 2007, two structures have been solved for this class of enzymes, with PDB accession codes 1V2X and 1ZJR.
