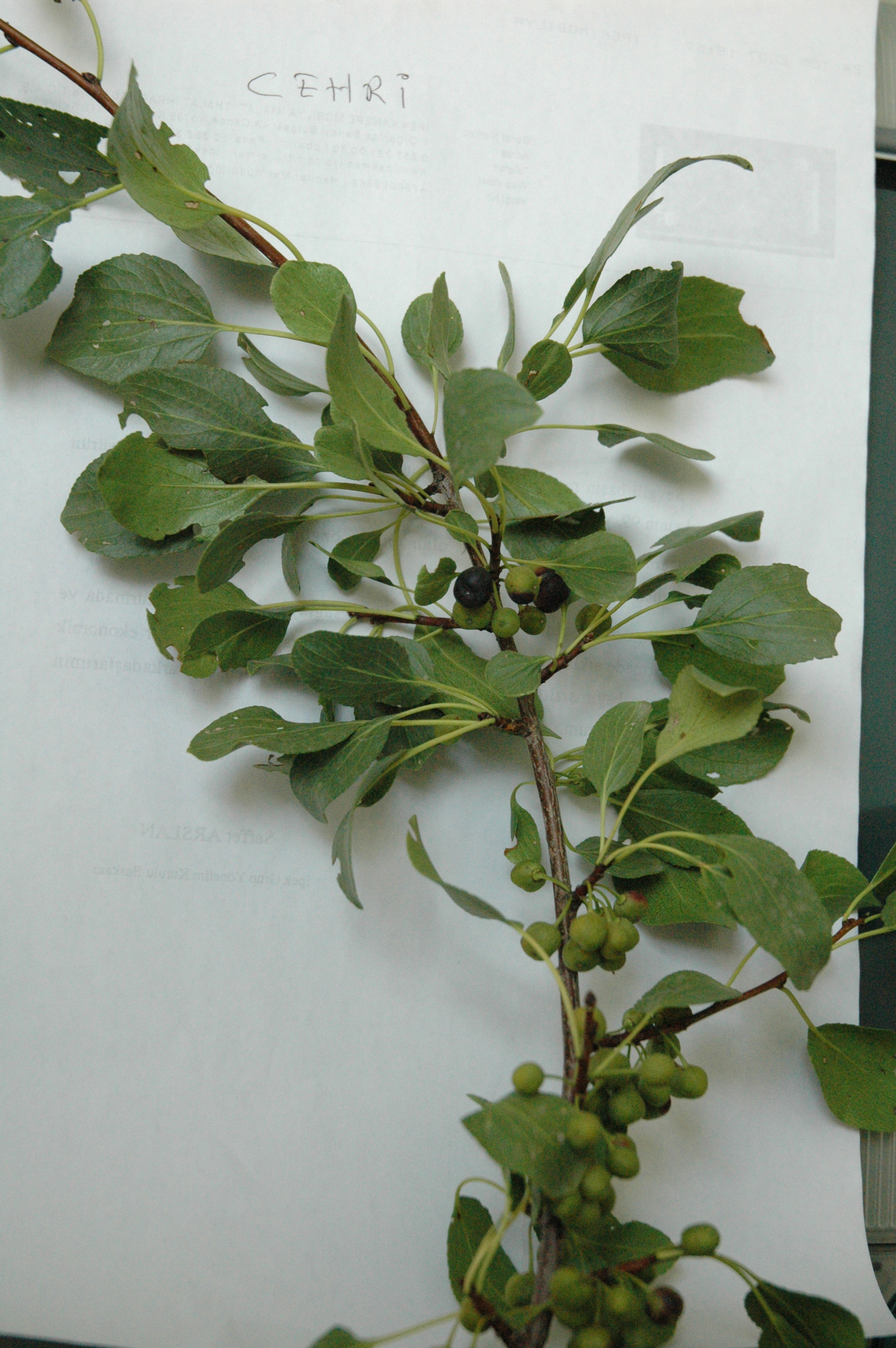

Scientific classification
- Kingdom: Plantae
- Clade: Embryophytes
- Clade: Tracheophytes
- Clade: Spermatophytes
- Clade: Angiosperms
- Clade: Eudicots
- Clade: Rosids
- Order: Rosales
- Family: Rhamnaceae
- Genus: Rhamnus
- Species: R. petiolaris

Binomial name
- Rhamnus petiolaris Boiss. & Balansa

= Rhamnus petiolaris =

Species of flowering plant

Rhamnus petiolaris is a species of flowering plant in the family Rhamnaceae. It is native to Iraq, Lebanon, Syria, and Turkey.

== Uses ==
Rhamnazin is an O-methylated flavonol, a type of chemical compound that can be found in R. petiolaris.
