= Flavonoid 4'-O-methyltransferase =

Identifiers
- EC no.: 2.1.1.231

Databases
- IntEnz: IntEnz view
- BRENDA: BRENDA entry
- ExPASy: NiceZyme view
- KEGG: KEGG entry
- MetaCyc: metabolic pathway
- PRIAM: profile
- PDB structures: RCSB PDB PDBe PDBsum
Search
- PMC: articles
- PubMed: articles
- NCBI: proteins

Flavonoid 4'-O-methyltransferase (EC 2.1.1.231, SOMT-2, 4'-hydroxyisoflavone methyltransferase) is an enzyme with systematic name S-adenosyl-L-methionine:flavonoid 4'-O-methyltransferase. This enzyme catalyses the following chemical reaction

naringenin
+ SAM
isosakuranetin
+ SAH

This is a methylation reaction in which the flavanone, naringenin, is converted to a specific methyl ether, isosakuranetin (ponciretin). The methyl group comes from the cofactor, S-adenosyl methionine (SAM), which becomes S-adenosyl-L-homocysteine (SAH). The enzyme was characterised from soybean.
