= Croton schiedeanus =

Conservation status
- Least Concern (IUCN 3.1)

Scientific classification
- Kingdom: Plantae
- Clade: Tracheophytes
- Clade: Angiosperms
- Clade: Eudicots
- Clade: Rosids
- Order: Malpighiales
- Family: Euphorbiaceae
- Genus: Croton
- Species: C. schiedeanus

Binomial name
- Croton schiedeanus Schltdl.

Synonyms
- Croton perobtusus, Lundell; Oxydectes schiedeana, (Schltdl.) Kuntze

Species of flowering plant

Croton schiedeanus is a plant species native from Mexico to tropical South America.

C schiedeanus is known to contain the flavonol ayanin and cis-clerodane diterpenoids.

== See also ==
- List of Croton species
