= Macrocin O-methyltransferase =

Identifiers
- EC no.: 2.1.1.101
- CAS no.: 79468-52-3

Databases
- IntEnz: IntEnz view
- BRENDA: BRENDA entry
- ExPASy: NiceZyme view
- KEGG: KEGG entry
- MetaCyc: metabolic pathway
- PRIAM: profile
- PDB structures: RCSB PDB PDBe PDBsum
- Gene Ontology: AmiGO / QuickGO
Search
- PMC: articles
- PubMed: articles
- NCBI: proteins

Macrocin O-methyltransferase (EC 2.1.1.101) is an enzyme that catalyzes the chemical reaction

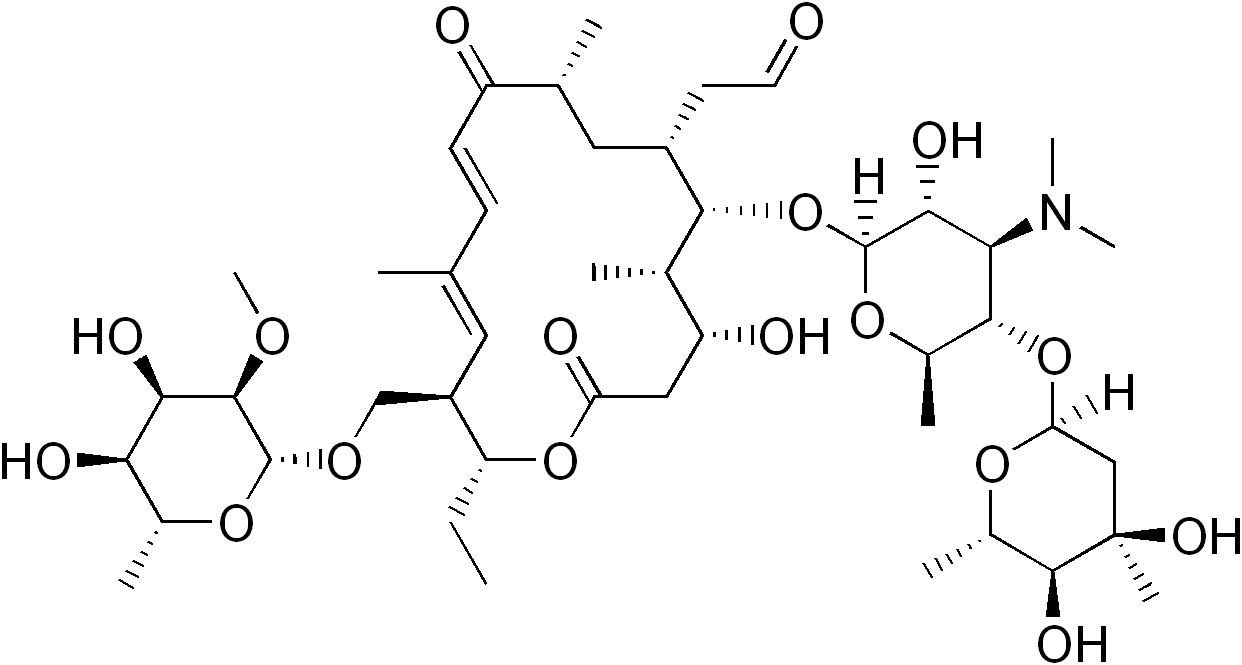
macrocin
+ SAM
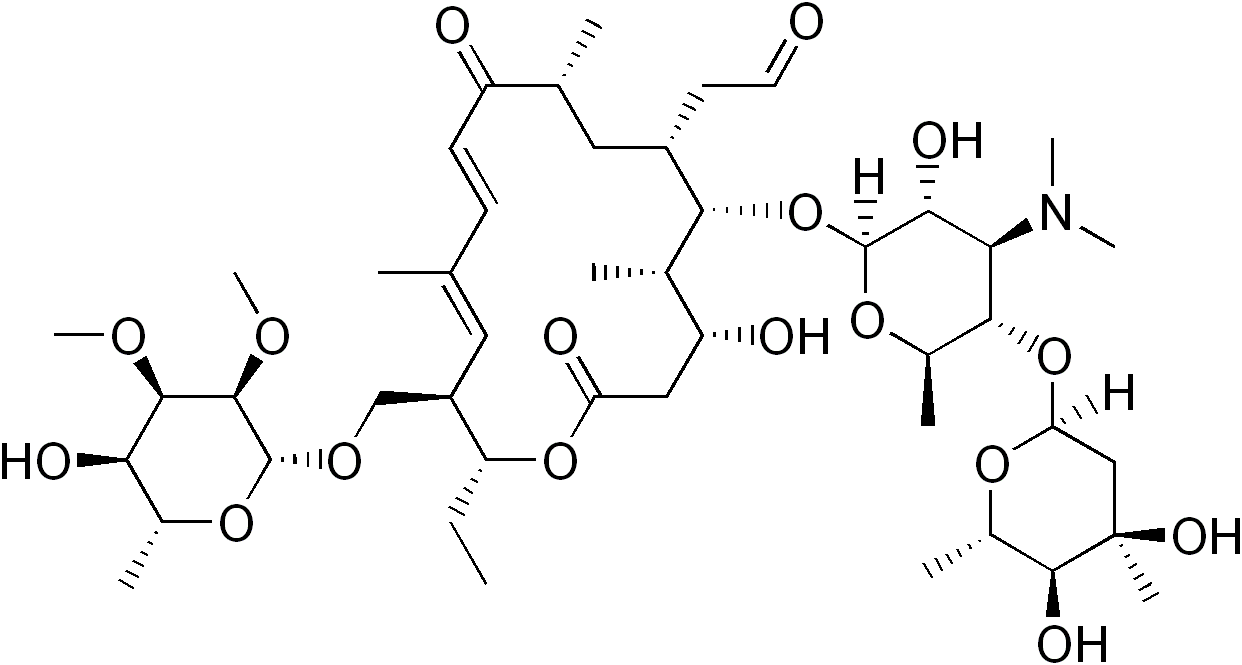
tylosin
+ SAH

This is a methylation reaction in which the macrolide antibiotic, macrocin, is converted to tylosin by addition of a methyl group to a specific hydroxyl oxygen. The methyl is transferred from the cofactor, S-adenosyl methionine (SAM), which becomes S-adenosyl-L-homocysteine (SAH). The enzyme was characterised from Streptomyces fradiae.

This enzyme belongs to the family of transferases, specifically those transferring one-carbon group methyltransferases. The systematic name of this enzyme class is S-adenosyl-L-methionine:macrocin 3"'-O-methyltransferase. Other names in common use include macrocin methyltransferase, and S-adenosyl-L-methionine-macrocin O-methyltransferase.
