= 3-methylquercetin 7-O-methyltransferase =

Class of enzymes

3-methylquercitin 7-O-methyltransferase

Identifiers
- EC no.: 2.1.1.82
- CAS no.: 96477-62-2

Databases
- IntEnz: IntEnz view
- BRENDA: BRENDA entry
- ExPASy: NiceZyme view
- KEGG: KEGG entry
- MetaCyc: metabolic pathway
- PRIAM: profile
- PDB structures: RCSB PDB PDBe PDBsum
- Gene Ontology: AmiGO / QuickGO
Search
- PMC: articles
- PubMed: articles
- NCBI: proteins

3-methylquercetin 7-O-methyltransferase (EC 2.1.1.82) is an enzyme that catalyzes the chemical reaction

3-O-methylquercetin
+ SAM
3,7-dimethylquercetin
+ SAH

This is a methylation reaction in which 3-O-methylquercetin is converted to 3,7-dimethylquercetin. The methyl group comes from the cofactor, S-adenosyl methionine (SAM), which becomes S-adenosyl-L-homocysteine (SAH).

The enzyme belongs to the family of transferases, specifically those transferring one-carbon group methyltransferases. The systematic name of this enzyme class is S-adenosyl-L-methionine:5,7,3',4'-tetrahydroxy-3-methoxyflavone 7-O-methyltransferase. Other names in common use include flavonol 7-O-methyltransferase, flavonol 7-methyltransferase, 7-OMT, S-adenosyl-L-methionine:3',4',5,7-tetrahydroxy-3-methoxyflavone, 7-O-methyltransferase, and 3-methylquercitin 7-O-methyltransferase [mis-spelt]. It can be found in Chrysosplenium americanum (American Golden Saxifrage).
