= Isoflavone 4'-O-methyltransferase =

Identifiers
- EC no.: 2.1.1.46
- CAS no.: 55071-80-2

Databases
- IntEnz: IntEnz view
- BRENDA: BRENDA entry
- ExPASy: NiceZyme view
- KEGG: KEGG entry
- MetaCyc: metabolic pathway
- PRIAM: profile
- PDB structures: RCSB PDB PDBe PDBsum
- Gene Ontology: AmiGO / QuickGO
Search
- PMC: articles
- PubMed: articles
- NCBI: proteins

Isoflavone 4'-O-methyltransferase (EC 2.1.1.46) is an enzyme that catalyzes a general chemical reaction that adds a methyl group to a specific phenolic oxygen in isoflavones, for example:

daidzein
+ SAM
formononetin
+ SAH

In this example, the methylation reaction converts daidzein to formomonetin. The methyl group comes from the cofactor, S-adenosyl methionine (SAM), which becomes S-adenosyl-L-homocysteine (SAH). The enzyme can act on other isoflavones such as genistein but flavanones such as naringenin are not substrates.

This enzyme belongs to the family of transferases, specifically those transferring one-carbon group methyltransferases. The systematic name of this enzyme class is S-adenosyl-L-methionine:isoflavone 4'-O-methyltransferase. Other names in common use include 4'-hydroxyisoflavone methyltransferase, isoflavone methyltransferase, and isoflavone O-methyltransferase.
