= 3,7-dimethylquercetin 4'-O-methyltransferase =

Class of enzymes

3,7-dimethylquercitin 4'-O-methyltransferase

Identifiers
- EC no.: 2.1.1.83
- CAS no.: 96477-60-0

Databases
- IntEnz: IntEnz view
- BRENDA: BRENDA entry
- ExPASy: NiceZyme view
- KEGG: KEGG entry
- MetaCyc: metabolic pathway
- PRIAM: profile
- PDB structures: RCSB PDB PDBe PDBsum
- Gene Ontology: AmiGO / QuickGO
Search
- PMC: articles
- PubMed: articles
- NCBI: proteins

3,7-dimethylquercetin 4'-O-methyltransferase (EC 2.1.1.83) is an enzyme that catalyzes the chemical reaction

3,7-dimethylquercetin
+ SAM
ayanin
+ SAH

This is a methylation reaction in which the O-methylated flavonoid, 3,7-dimethylquercetin, is converted to ayanin. The methyl group comes from the cofactor, S-adenosyl methionine (SAM), which becomes S-adenosyl-L-homocysteine (SAH).

This enzyme belongs to the family of transferases, specifically those transferring one-carbon group methyltransferases. The systematic name of this enzyme class is S-adenosyl-L-methionine:5,3',4'-trihydroxy-3,7-dimethoxyflavone 4'-O-methyltransferase. Other names in common use include flavonol 4'-O-methyltransferase, flavonol 4'-methyltransferase, 4'-OMT, S-adenosyl-L-methionine:3',4',5-trihydroxy-3,7-dimethoxyflavone, 4'-O-methyltransferase, and 3,7-dimethylquercitin 4'-O-methyltransferase [mis-spelt].
