= Hexaprenyldihydroxybenzoate methyltransferase =

hexaprenyldihydroxybenzoate methyltransferase

Identifiers
- EC no.: 2.1.1.114
- CAS no.: 139569-30-5

Databases
- IntEnz: IntEnz view
- BRENDA: BRENDA entry
- ExPASy: NiceZyme view
- KEGG: KEGG entry
- MetaCyc: metabolic pathway
- PRIAM: profile
- PDB structures: RCSB PDB PDBe PDBsum
- Gene Ontology: AmiGO / QuickGO
Search
- PMC: articles
- PubMed: articles
- NCBI: proteins

In enzymology, a hexaprenyldihydroxybenzoate methyltransferase (EC 2.1.1.114) is an enzyme that catalyzes the chemical reaction

S-adenosyl-L-methionine + 3-hexaprenyl-4,5-dihydroxybenzoate $\rightleftharpoons$ S-adenosyl-L-homocysteine + 3-hexaprenyl-4-hydroxy-5-methoxybenzoate

Thus, the two substrates of this enzyme are S-adenosyl methionine and 3-hexaprenyl-4,5-dihydroxybenzoate, whereas its two products are S-adenosylhomocysteine and 3-hexaprenyl-4-hydroxy-5-methoxybenzoate.

This enzyme belongs to the family of transferases, specifically those transferring one-carbon group methyltransferases. The systematic name of this enzyme class is S-adenosyl-L-methionine:3-hexaprenyl-4,5-dihydroxylate O-methyltransferase. Other names in common use include 3,4-dihydroxy-5-hexaprenylbenzoate methyltransferase, and dihydroxyhexaprenylbenzoate methyltransferase. This enzyme participates in ubiquinone biosynthesis.
