= Quercetin 3-O-methyltransferase =

Identifiers
- EC no.: 2.1.1.76
- CAS no.: 75603-21-3

Databases
- IntEnz: IntEnz view
- BRENDA: BRENDA entry
- ExPASy: NiceZyme view
- KEGG: KEGG entry
- MetaCyc: metabolic pathway
- PRIAM: profile
- PDB structures: RCSB PDB PDBe PDBsum
- Gene Ontology: AmiGO / QuickGO
Search
- PMC: articles
- PubMed: articles
- NCBI: proteins

Quercetin 3-O-methyltransferase (EC 2.1.1.76) is an enzyme that catalyzes the chemical reaction

quercetin
+ SAM
3-O-methylquercetin
+ SAH

This is a methylation reaction in which the flavonol, quercetin, is converted to 3-O-methylquercetin. The methyl group comes from the cofactor, S-adenosyl methionine (SAM), which becomes S-adenosyl-L-homocysteine (SAH).

This enzyme belongs to the family of transferases, specifically those transferring one-carbon group methyltransferases. The systematic name of this enzyme class is S-adenosyl-L-methionine:3,5,7,3',4'-pentahydroxyflavone 3-O-methyltransferase. Other names in common use include flavonol 3-O-methyltransferase, and flavonoid 3-methyltransferase.
