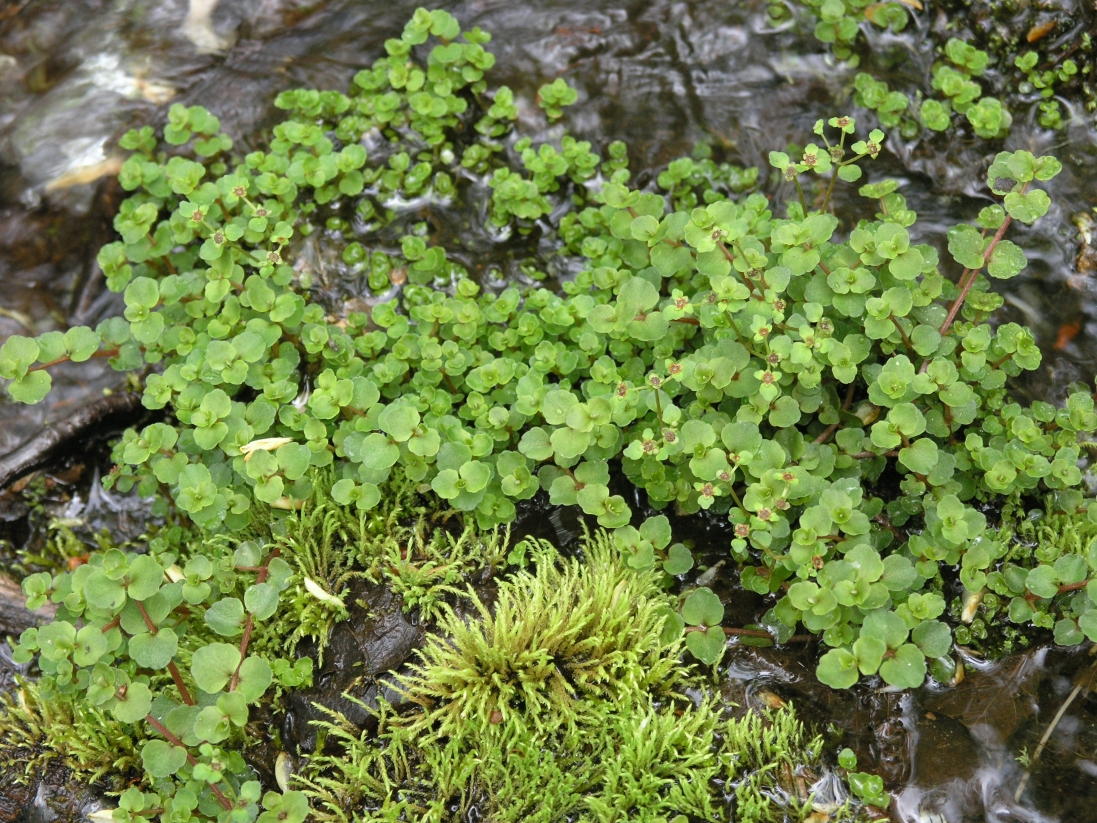
- In Mount Carleton Provincial Park, New Brunswick, Canada

Conservation status
- Least Concern (IUCN 3.1)

- Secure (NatureServe)

Scientific classification
- Kingdom: Plantae
- Clade: Tracheophytes
- Clade: Angiosperms
- Clade: Eudicots
- Order: Saxifragales
- Family: Saxifragaceae
- Genus: Chrysosplenium
- Species: C. americanum

Binomial name
- Chrysosplenium americanum Schwein. ex Hook.

= Chrysosplenium americanum =

Species of plant

Chrysosplenium americanum, the American golden saxifrage, is a species of golden saxifrage native to eastern North America.

== Description ==
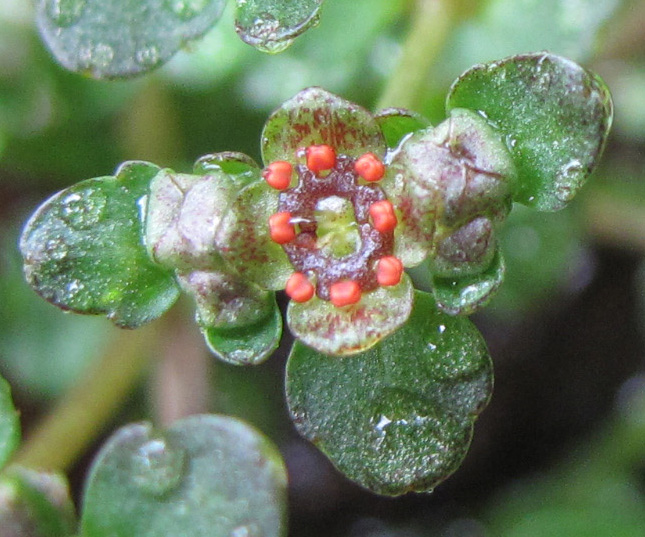
Chrysosplenium americanum flower with red anthers

=== Vegetative characteristics ===
Its stolons are 0.3-1 mm wide.

=== Generative characteristics ===
The androecium consists of 8 stamens with red anthers. The fruits produce 6-16 spherical to ovoid, brown seeds.

== Cytology ==
The diploid chromosome count is 2n = 18, 24.

== Ecology ==
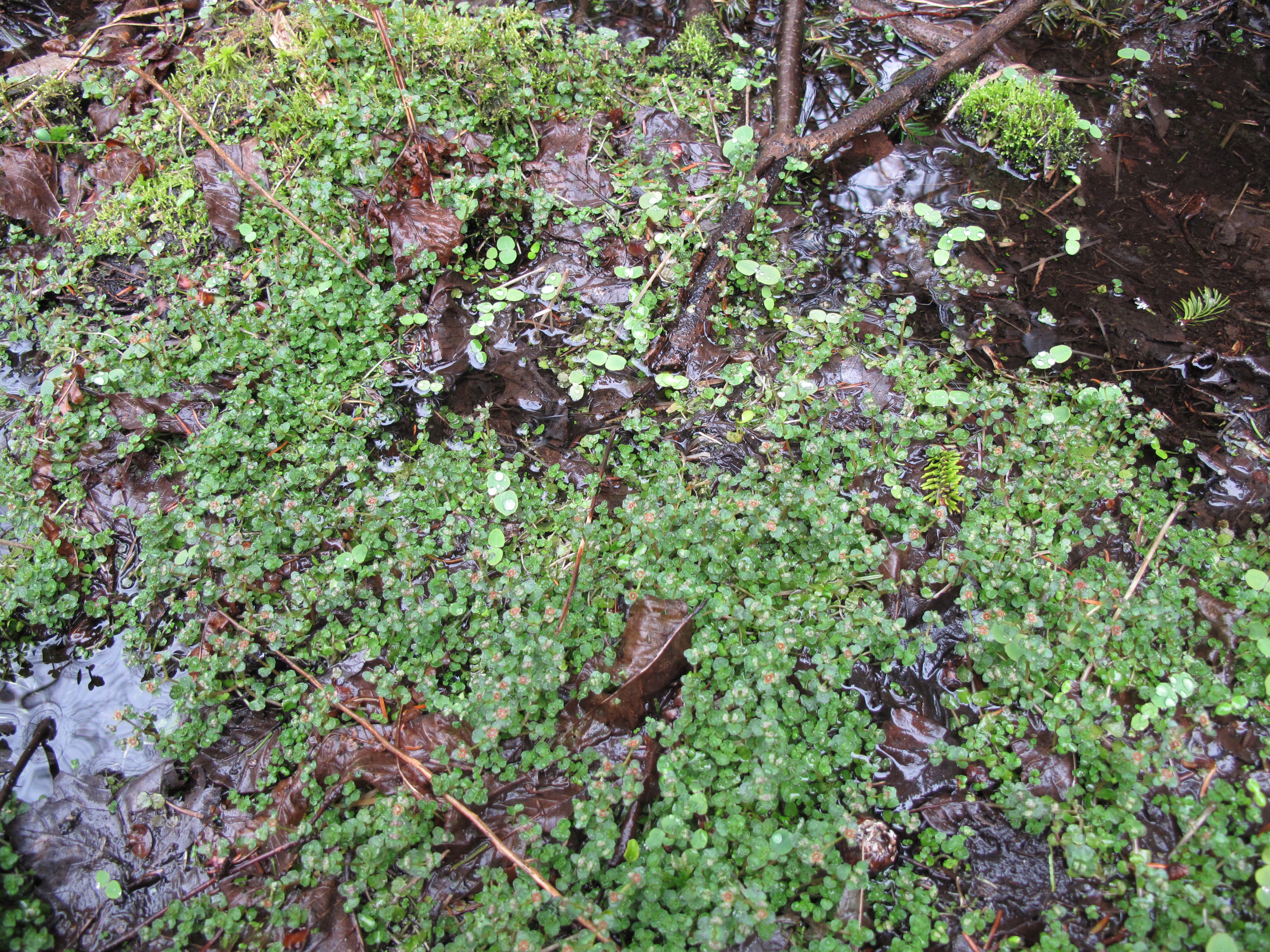
Chrysosplenium americanum growing in a wet habitat

=== Habitat ===
It occurs in wet habitats along streams in forests and swamps.
