= 3-demethylubiquinone-9 3-O-methyltransferase =

Class of enzymes

Identifiers
- EC no.: 2.1.1.64
- CAS no.: 63774-48-1

Databases
- IntEnz: IntEnz view
- BRENDA: BRENDA entry
- ExPASy: NiceZyme view
- KEGG: KEGG entry
- MetaCyc: metabolic pathway
- PRIAM: profile
- PDB structures: RCSB PDB PDBe PDBsum
- Gene Ontology: AmiGO / QuickGO
Search
- PMC: articles
- PubMed: articles
- NCBI: proteins

In enzymology, a 3-demethylubiquinone-9 3-O-methyltransferase (EC 2.1.1.64) is an enzyme that catalyzes the chemical reaction

S-adenosyl-L-methionine + 3-demethylubiquinone-9 $\rightleftharpoons$ S-adenosyl-L-homocysteine + ubiquinone-9

Thus, the two substrates of this enzyme are S-adenosyl methionine and 3-demethylubiquinone-9, whereas its two products are S-adenosylhomocysteine and ubiquinone-9.

This enzyme participates in ubiquinone biosynthesis.

== Nomenclature ==
This enzyme belongs to the family of transferases, specifically those transferring one-carbon group methyltransferases. The systematic name of this enzyme class is S-adenosyl-L-methionine:2-nonaprenyl-3-methyl-5-hydroxy-6-methoxy-1, 4-benzoquinone 3-O-methyltransferase. Other names in common use include 5-demethylubiquinone-9 methyltransferase, OMHMB-methyltransferase, 2-Octaprenyl-3-methyl-5-hydroxy-6-methoxy-1,4-benzoquinone, methyltransferase, S-adenosyl-L-methionine:2-octaprenyl-3-methyl-5-hydroxy-6-methoxy-, and 1,4-benzoquinone-O-methyltransferase.
