= Methyl ether =

Methyl ether may refer to:

- Any chemical compound of the ether class that includes a methyl group
- Dimethyl ether, often simply called methyl ether

== See also ==
- Methoxy group, –OCH_{3}
