= S-Adenosyl-L-homocysteine =

Names
- IUPAC name S-(5′-Deoxyadenos-5′-yl)-L-homocysteine
- Systematic IUPAC name (2S)-2-Amino-4-({[(2S,3S,4R,5R)-5-(6-amino-9H-purin-9-yl)-3,4-dihydroxyoxolan-2-yl]methyl}sulfanyl)butanoic acid
- Other names AdoHcy, 2-S-adenosyl-L-homocysteine, 5′-S-(3-Amino-3-carboxypropyl)-5′-thioadenosine S-adenosylhomocysteine, SAH

Identifiers
| CAS Number | 979-92-0 |
| 3D model (JSmol) | Interactive image |
| ChEBI | CHEBI:16680 |
| ChEMBL | ChEMBL418052 |
| ChemSpider | 388301 |
| ECHA InfoCard | 100.012.328 |
| IUPHAR/BPS | 5265 |
| KEGG | C00021 |
| MeSH | S-Adenosylhomocysteine |
| PubChem CID | 439155 |
| UNII | 8K31Q2S66S |
| CompTox Dashboard (EPA) | DTXSID30895860 |
- InChI: InChI=1S/C14H20N6O5S/c15-6(14(23)24)1-2-26-3-7-9(21)10(22)13(25-7)20-5-19-8-11(16)17-4-18-12(8)20/h4-7,9-10,13,21-22H,1-3,15H2,(H,23,24)(H2,16,17,18)/t6-,7+,9+,10+,13+/m0/s1 Key: ZJUKTBDSGOFHSH-WFMPWKQPSA-N; InChI=1/C14H20N6O5S/c15-6(14(23)24)1-2-26-3-7-9(21)10(22)13(25-7)20-5-19-8-11(16)17-4-18-12(8)20/h4-7,9-10,13,21-22H,1-3,15H2,(H,23,24)(H2,16,17,18)/t6-,7+,9+,10+,13+/m0/s1 Key: ZJUKTBDSGOFHSH-WFMPWKQPBX
- SMILES: O=C(O)[C@@H](N)CCSC[C@H]3O[C@@H](n2cnc1c(ncnc12)N)[C@H](O)[C@@H]3O

Properties
| Chemical formula | C_{14}H_{20}N_{6}O_{5}S |
| Molar mass | 384.41 g·mol^{−1} |
- Except where otherwise noted, data are given for materials in their standard state (at 25 °C [77 °F], 100 kPa). verify (what is ?) Infobox references

S-Adenosyl-L-homocysteine (SAH) is the biosynthetic precursor to homocysteine. SAH is formed by the demethylation of S-adenosyl-L-methionine. Adenosylhomocysteinase converts SAH into homocysteine and adenosine.

== Biological role ==
DNA methyltransferases are inhibited by SAH. Two S-adenosyl-L-homocysteine cofactor products can bind the active site of DNA methyltransferase 3B and prevent the DNA duplex from binding to the active site, which inhibits DNA methylation.
