= Nan Bao =

Formulation of Chinese herbs

Nan Bao (男宝) is a mixture of Chinese herbs purported to increase the male libido. It is available from a variety of suppliers in similar formulations.

The capsules typically contain an amount of icariin, a substance commonly derived from "Horny Goat Weed" leaf and considered an aphrodisiac.

== Ingredients ==
One formulation lists ingredients as follows:

- root of Panax Ginseng
- root of Dong Quai
- rhizome Curculigo
- root of Astragalus
- Poria sclerotium
- Psoralea fruit
- Rehmannia cured root tuber
- Bai-zhu atractylodes rhizome
- Cynomorium fleshy stem
- Palm-leaf Raspberry fruit
- Sichuan Teasel root
- Lycium fruit
- Tree Peony root bark
- Japanese Dodder seed
- Cassia bark
- Chinese Licorice root
- Morinda root
- Achyranthes root
- Fenugreek seed
- Cistanche tubulosa (Desert Broomrape) stem
- Epimedium ("Horny Goat Weed") leaf
- Ophiopogon tuber
