= Methylquercetin =

Methylquercetin may refer to:

- Azaleatin (5-methylquercetin)
- Isorhamnetin (3'-methylquercetin)
- Rhamnetin (7-methylquercetin)
- Tamarixetin (4'-methylquercetin)
