= Caloptilia magnifica =

Scientific classification
- Kingdom: Animalia
- Phylum: Arthropoda
- Clade: Pancrustacea
- Class: Insecta
- Order: Lepidoptera
- Family: Gracillariidae
- Genus: Caloptilia
- Species: C. magnifica

Binomial name
- Caloptilia magnifica (Stainton, 1867)

Synonyms
- Gracilaria magnifica Stainton, 1867; Calybites magnifica; Caloptilia redtenbacheri (Mann, 1867)

Species of moth

Caloptilia magnifica is a moth of the family Gracillariidae. It is known from the southern Alps and former Yugoslavia, and a subspecies of Japan.

The wingspan is 10.5–11 mm.

The larvae of subspecies magnifica feeds on Epimedium alpinum, while subspecies moriokensis feeds on Epimedium grandiflorum var. thunbergianum. They mine the leaves of their host plant.

== Subspecies ==
- Caloptilia magnifica magnifica (Europe)
- Caloptilia magnifica moriokensis Kumata, 1982 (Japan (Honshū))
