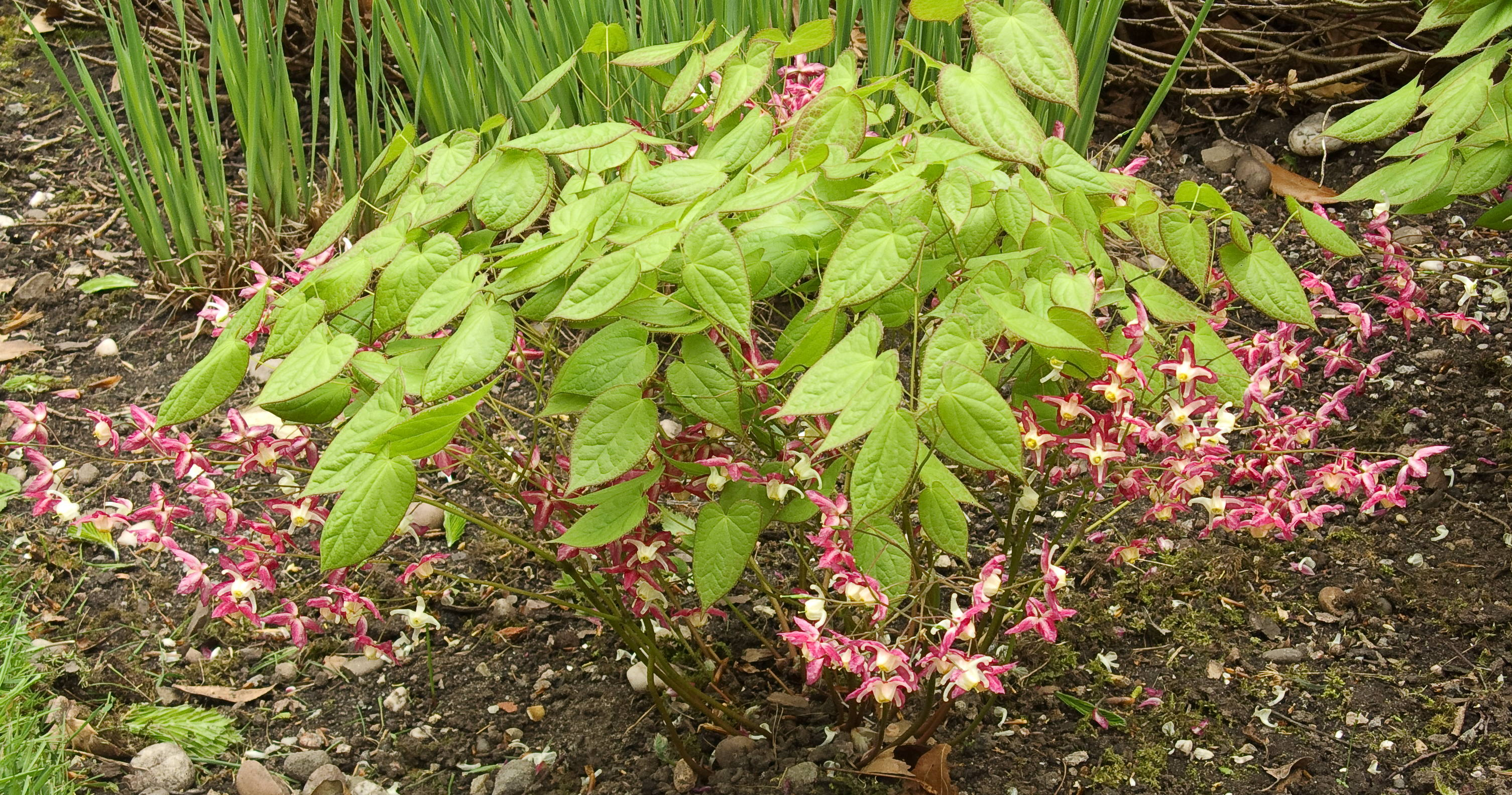

Scientific classification
- Kingdom: Plantae
- Clade: Tracheophytes
- Clade: Angiosperms
- Clade: Eudicots
- Order: Ranunculales
- Family: Berberidaceae
- Genus: Epimedium
- Species: E. × rubrum

Binomial name
- Epimedium × rubrum E.Morren

Synonyms
- Epimedium alpinum 'Rubrum'

= Epimedium × rubrum =

Hybrid species of flowering plant

Epimedium × rubrum, known as red barrenwort, is a species of perennial flowering plant in the family Berberidaceae, cultivated in gardens. It is considered to be a hybrid between E. alpinum and E. grandiflorum (hence the symbol ×). The Royal Horticultural Society has given it the Award of Garden Merit (AGM).

== Description ==
Epimedium × rubrum is a deciduous perennial, spreading by rhizomes. It is about 30 cm (1.0 ft) tall. When the young leaves emerge in spring, they are tinged with red. The leaves also turn red in the autumn. The flowers appear with the young leaves in spring, and are borne on a loose raceme. Individual flowers are about 2 cm (0.8 in) across, with red sepals and yellow petals.

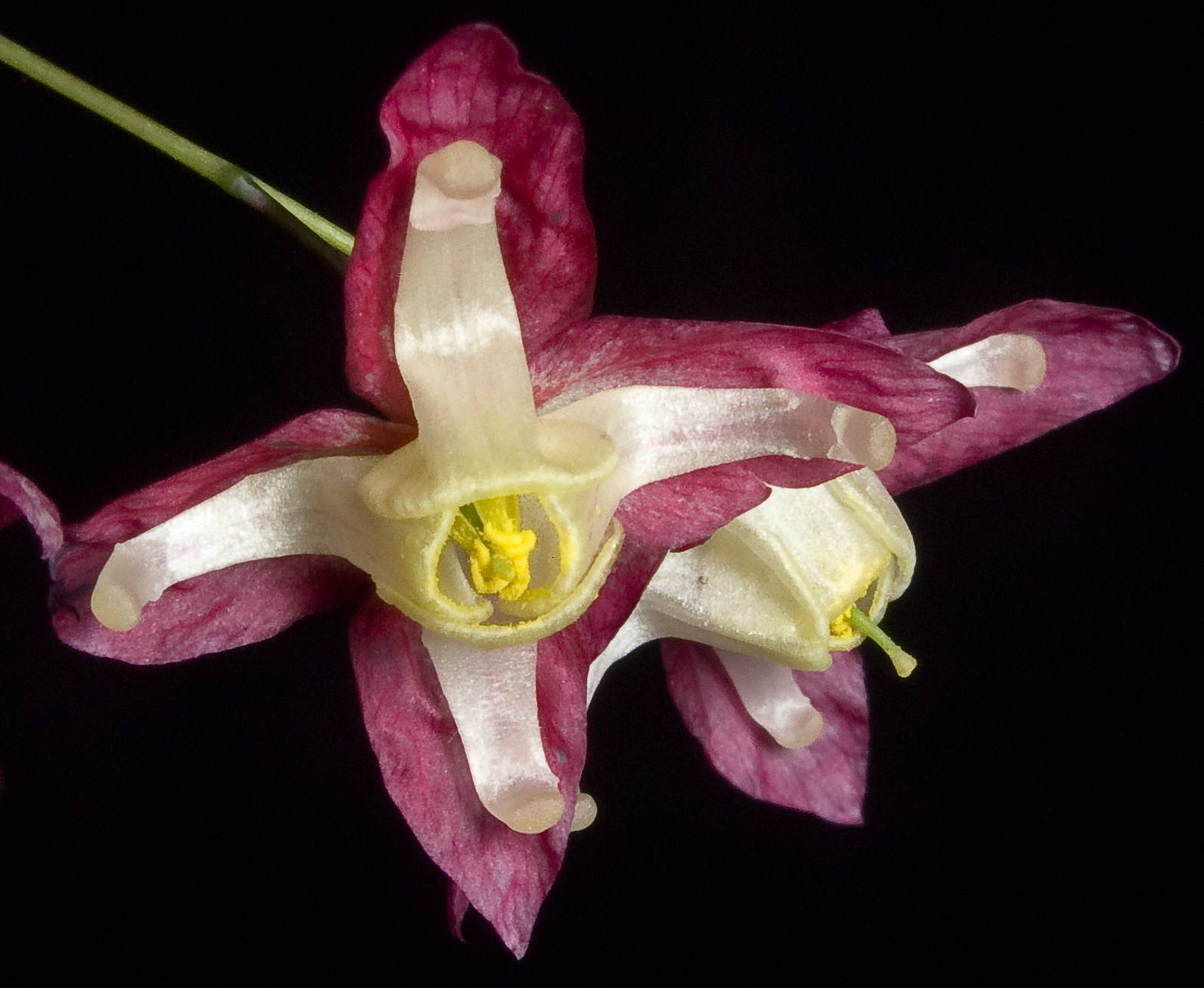
Flowers of E. × rubrum

== Cultivation ==
Epimedium × rubrum is recommended for cultivation in shade or part-shade in moist soil, although it tolerates drier conditions when well-established. Old foliage should be cut back before the new leaves and flowers appear in spring. It was given the Award of Garden Merit by the Royal Horticultural Society in 1993, with a hardiness rating of H7, meaning that it is very hardy, withstanding temperatures below −20 °C (−4 °F).
