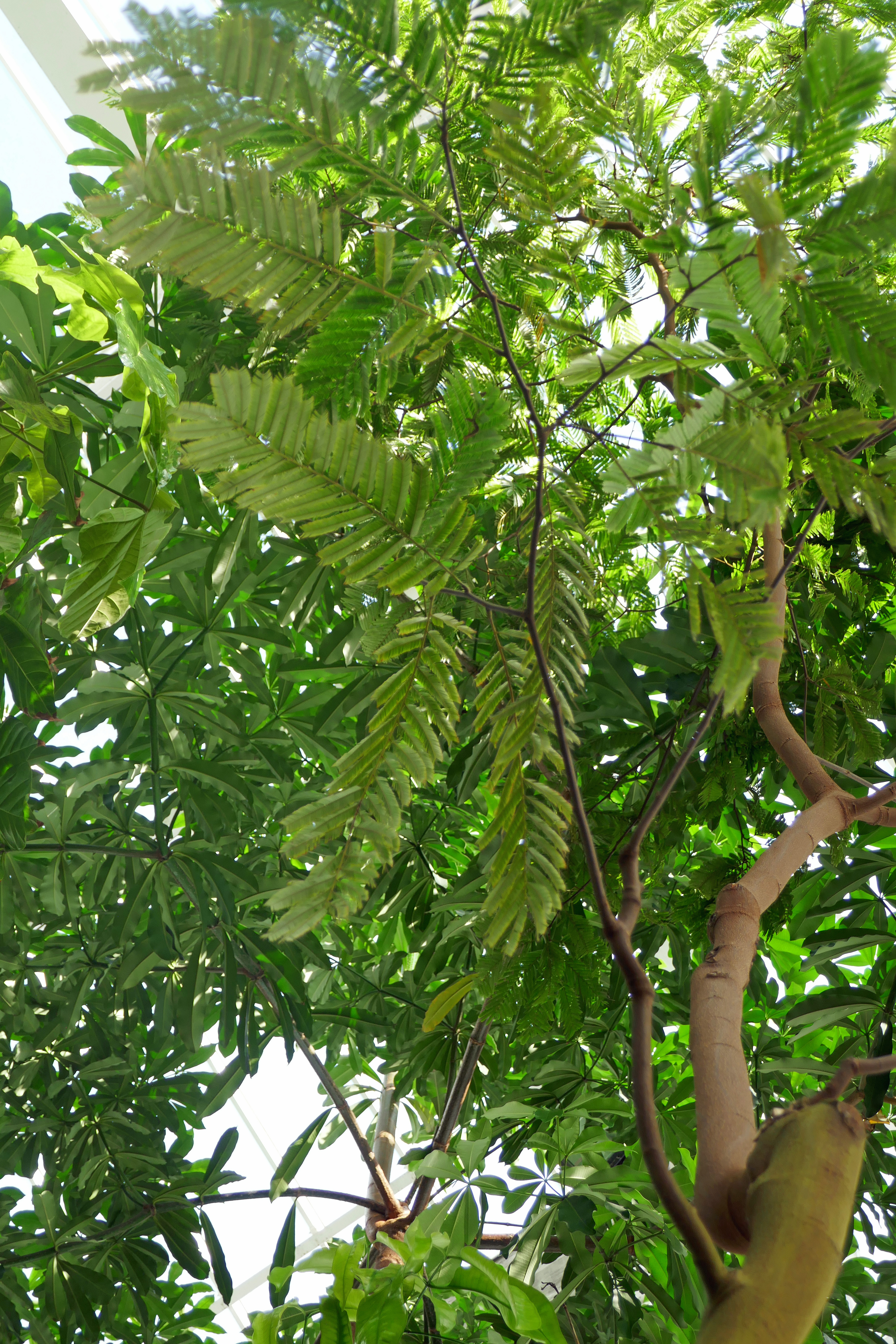
- Piptadeniastrum africanum in the Meise Botanic Garden, Belgium

Conservation status
- Least Concern (IUCN 3.1)

Scientific classification
- Kingdom: Plantae
- Clade: Tracheophytes
- Clade: Angiosperms
- Clade: Eudicots
- Clade: Rosids
- Order: Fabales
- Family: Fabaceae
- Subfamily: Caesalpinioideae
- Clade: Mimosoid clade
- Genus: Piptadeniastrum; Brenan (1955)
- Species: P. africanum

Binomial name
- Piptadeniastrum africanum (Hook.f.) Brenan (1955)

Synonyms
- Piptadenia africana Hook.f. (1849)

= Piptadeniastrum =

Genus of legumes

Piptadeniastrum africanum is a tall deciduous tree within the legume family, Fabaceae. It is native to the humid tropics of sub-Saharan Africa, ranging from Senegal to Sudan and Angola. It is the sole species in genus Piptadeniastrum. It is also called Piptadenia africana, and its timber is traded under the names Dabema or Dahoma. It commonly occurs in freshwater swamp forests but can also be found further north.

== Description ==
Piptadeniastrum africanum is a medium-sized to large tree capable of growing to 50 meters tall, with the record being 199 ft 1 in (60.68 m) and a maximum girth a breast height of 14 ft 9 in (4.50 m) in Ghana. It has wide spreading branches. Its trunk is straight and cylindrical while the base of the tree has thin buttress roots that can reach a height of 5 meters or more and extends along the ground, its bark is grey to brown in color but reddish at the base. Leaves are alternate, bipinnately compound in arrangement with about 10 - 20 pairs of pinnae and about 30 - 58 leaflets per each pinnae. Leaflets, sessile and small, 0.3 x 1 cm long and 0.8 x 1.25 mm wide, glossy green above and paler beneath. Flower is yellowish to white colored and fruit is a brown woody pod.

== Distribution ==
Naturally occurs in the humid Guineo-Congolian forest of West and Central Africa from Senegal to Sudan and moving southwards towards northern Angola. It is locally known as Dabema in Ivory Coast and as Dahoma in Ghana.

== Chemistry ==
Methanol and aqueous extracts from the stem bark tested for the presence of flavonoids, phenols, tannins and saponins. Profiles of its compounds include a variety of dihydroxy-trimethoxy(iso)flavone isomers, apigenin, chrysoeriol, eriodictyol, luteolin, and liquiritigenin.

== Uses ==
The chemical compounds of Piptadeniastrum africanum have generated interest among researchers, largely due to the wide variety of afflictions that plant extracts are used to treat in traditional medicine. Extracts of the species are used to treat gastric ulcers. The Baka people of Cameroon use macerated stem bark extracts in preparations to treat abdominal pains while some healers use leaf extracts as a tonic or as an aphrodisiac. In Congo and Ghana, it is applied in native medicine as a treatment for back pains and sexual asthenia.

Its timber is valued for use in building canoes and in marine and bridge construction.
