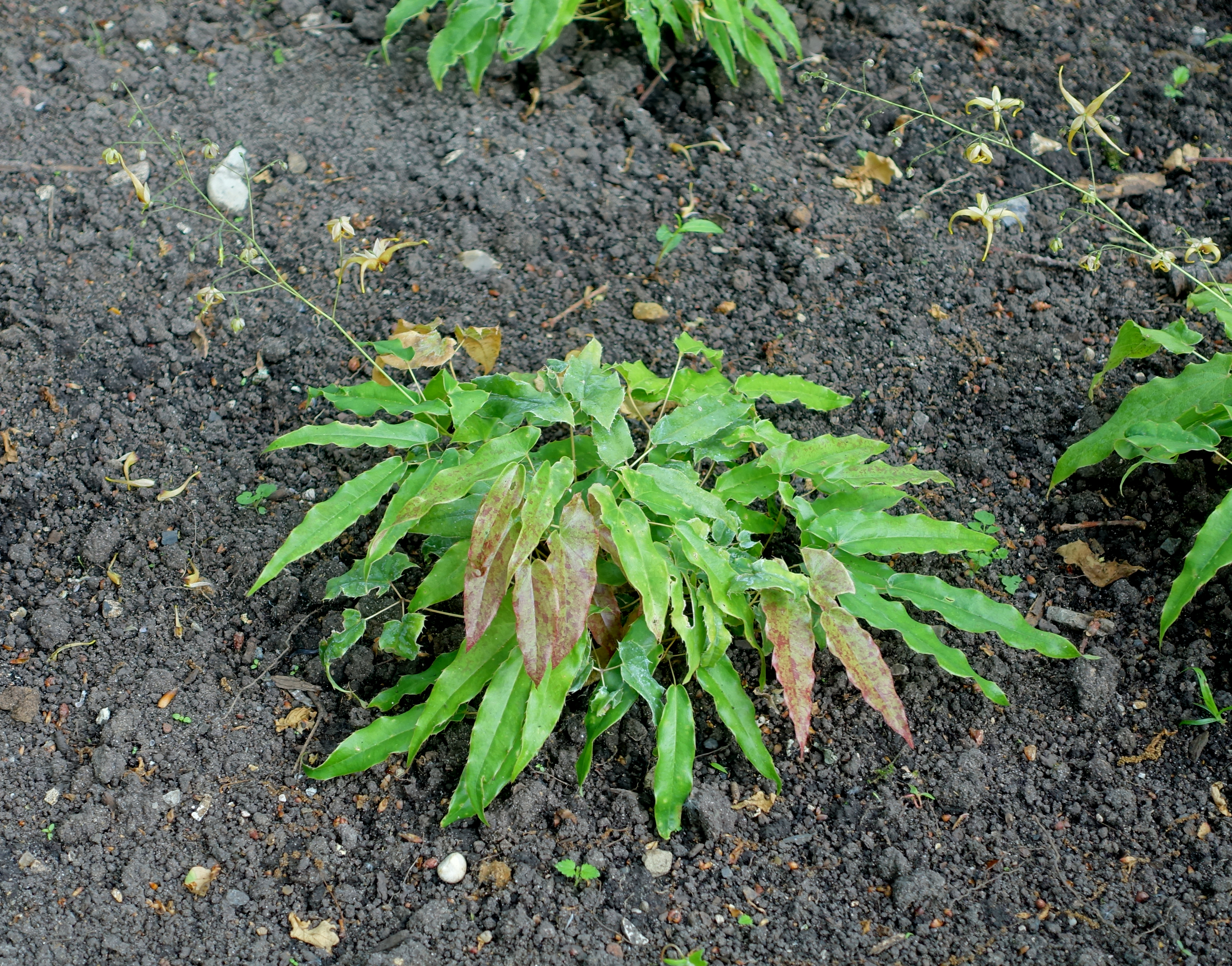

Scientific classification
- Kingdom: Plantae
- Clade: Embryophytes
- Clade: Tracheophytes
- Clade: Spermatophytes
- Clade: Angiosperms
- Clade: Eudicots
- Order: Ranunculales
- Family: Berberidaceae
- Genus: Epimedium
- Species: E. wushanense

Binomial name
- Epimedium wushanense T.S.Ying

= Epimedium wushanense =

Species of flowering plant

Epimedium wushanense, the Wushan fairy wings, is a flowering plant species in the genus Epimedium.

== Chemistry ==
E. wushanense contains a number of flavanoids. 37 compounds were characterized from the underground and aerial parts of the plant. Among them, 28 compounds were prenylflavonoids. The predominant flavonoid, epimedin C, ranged from 1.4 to 5.1% in aerial parts and 1.0 to 2.8% in underground parts. It also contains wushanicaritin and wushankaempferol.

Seven flavonoids named diphylloside A, epimedoside A, epimedin C, icariin, epimedoside C, icarisoside A, desmethylanhydroicaritin, as well as oleanolic acid can be isolated from the roots.
