= Luteolin O-methyltransferase =

Identifiers
- EC no.: 2.1.1.42
- CAS no.: 37205-55-3

Databases
- IntEnz: IntEnz view
- BRENDA: BRENDA entry
- ExPASy: NiceZyme view
- KEGG: KEGG entry
- MetaCyc: metabolic pathway
- PRIAM: profile
- PDB structures: RCSB PDB PDBe PDBsum
- Gene Ontology: AmiGO / QuickGO
Search
- PMC: articles
- PubMed: articles
- NCBI: proteins

Luteolin O-methyltransferase (EC 2.1.1.42) is an enzyme that catalyzes the chemical reaction

luteolin
+ SAM
chrysoeriol
+ SAH

This is a methylation reaction in which the flavone, luteolin, is converted to chrysoeriol. The methyl group comes from the cofactor, S-adenosyl methionine (SAM), which loses its methyl group and becomes S-adenosyl-L-homocysteine (SAH).

Luteolin O-methyltransferase can also act on flavanols and converts quercetin to isorhamnetin:

quercetin
+ SAM
isorhamnetin
+ SAH

This enzyme belongs to the family of transferases, specifically those transferring one-carbon group methyltransferases. The systematic name of this enzyme class is S-adenosyl-L-methionine:5,7,3',4'-tetrahydroxyflavone 3'-O-methyltransferase. Other names in common use include o-dihydric phenol methyltransferase, luteolin methyltransferase, luteolin 3'-O-methyltransferase, o-diphenol m-O-methyltransferase, o-dihydric phenol meta-O-methyltransferase, and S-adenosylmethionine:flavone/flavonol 3'-O-methyltransferase. This enzyme participates in flavonoid biosynthesis and reacts with flavones in the 3' position, preferring those with a second hydroxy group adjacent in the 4' position.
