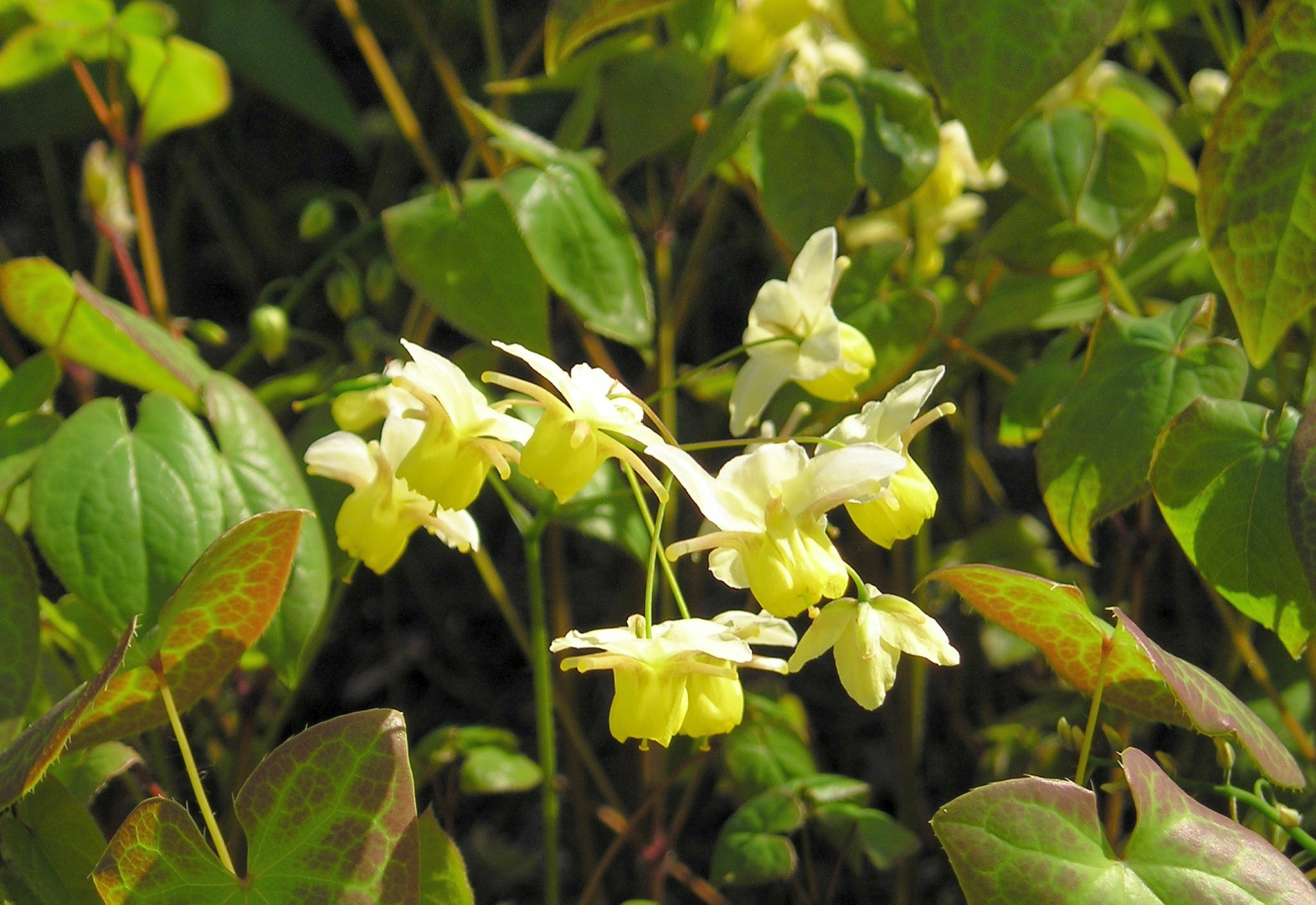
- Epimedium × versicolor

Scientific classification
- Kingdom: Plantae
- Clade: Embryophytes
- Clade: Tracheophytes
- Clade: Angiosperms
- Clade: Eudicots
- Order: Ranunculales
- Family: Berberidaceae
- Genus: Epimedium; L.

Type species
- Epimedium alpinum L.

Synonyms
- Aceranthus C.Morren & Decne.; × Bonstedtia H.R.Wehrh.; Endoplectris Raf.

= Epimedium =

Genus of flowering plants belonging to the barberry family

Epimedium
- Chinese: 淫羊藿
- Literal meaning: "lascivious goat huo"
Transcriptions
Standard Mandarin
- Hanyu Pinyin: yín yáng huò
- IPA: [ǐn jǎŋ xwô]
Yue: Cantonese
- Yale Romanization: Yàhm yèuhng fok
- Jyutping: Jam4 joeng4 fok3
- IPA: [jɐm˩ jœŋ˩ fɔk̚˧]

Epimedium, also known as barrenwort, bishop's hat, fairy wings, horny goat weed, or yin yang huo (Chinese: 淫羊藿; pinyin: Yínyánghùo; Wade–Giles: Yin²-yang²-huo⁴), is a genus of flowering plants in the family Berberidaceae. The majority of the species are endemic to China, with smaller numbers elsewhere in Asia and a few in the Mediterranean region.

Epimedium species are deciduous or evergreen hardy perennials. The majority have four-parted "spider-like" flowers in spring.

The species used as a dietary supplement is Epimedium grandiflorum. It contains icariin, which is a weak PDE5 inhibitor, in vitro. Its clinical effects are unknown. While there is little clinical evidence to date, as sildenafil, vardenafil, and tadalafil–sold under the brand names Viagra, Levitra and Cialis–are all based on (stronger) PDE5 inhibitory action, it is thought to have erectogenic properties and is found in some men's sexual health supplements.

== Description ==
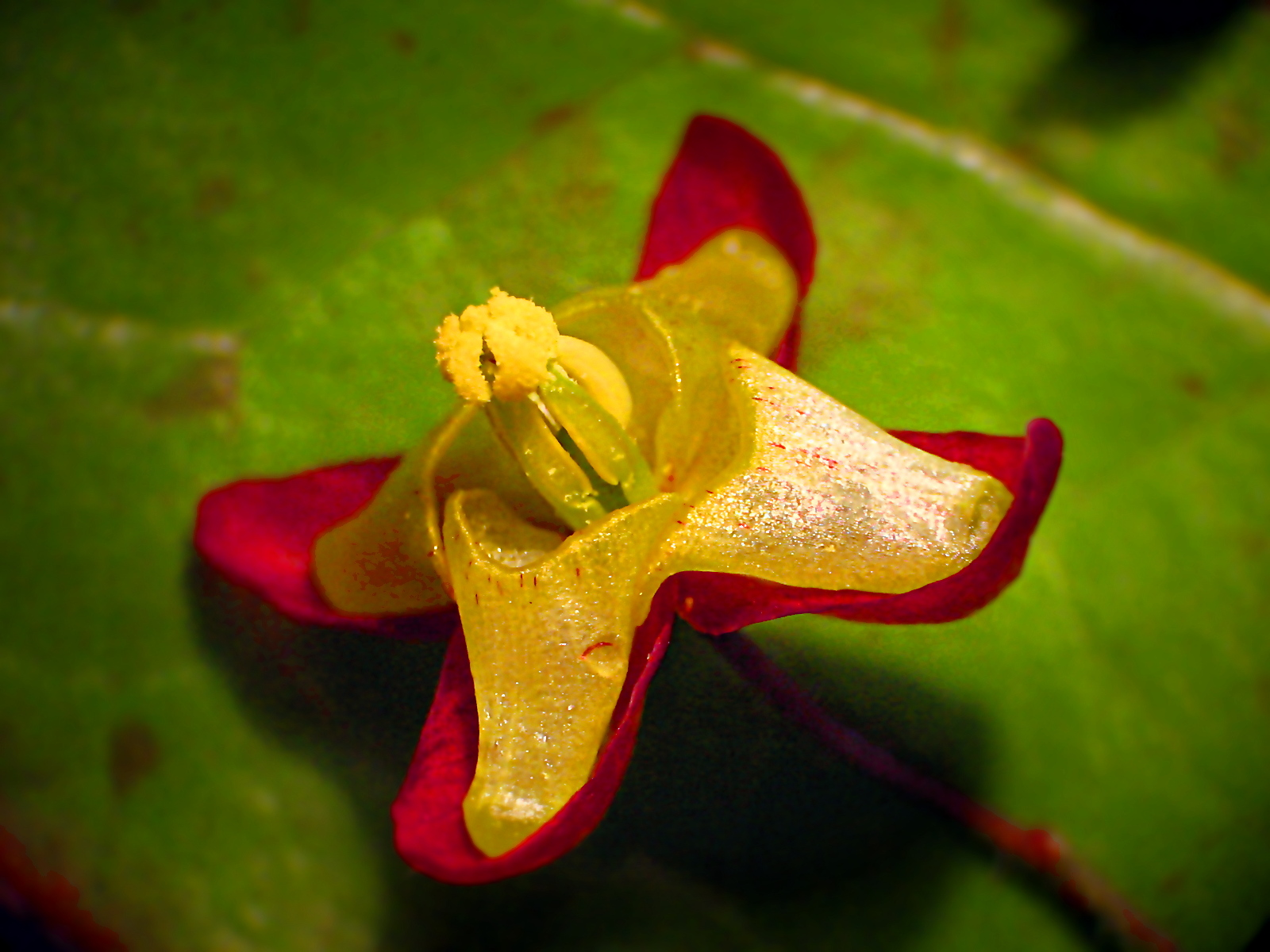
Epimedium alpinum flower; note the spurs are almost as long as the sepals

Labelled flowers of E. × perralchicum 'Fröhnleiten'

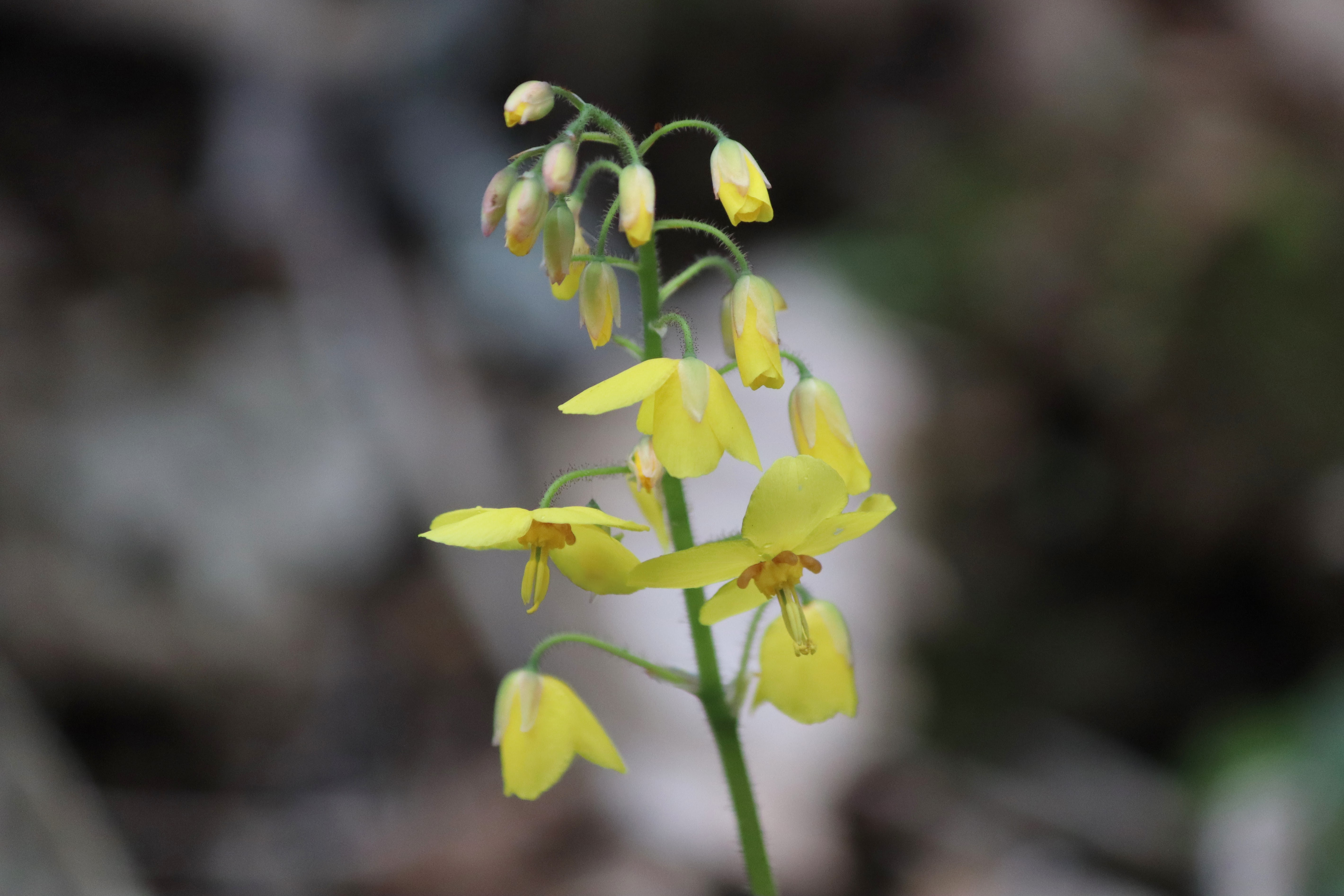
E. × perralchicum 'Fröhnleiten' in Conservatoire botanique national de Brest, spring 2025

Species of Epimedium are herbaceous perennials, growing from an underground rhizome. Their growth habits are somewhat variable. Some have solitary stems, others have a "tufted" habit, with multiple stems growing close together. There may be several leaves to a stem or the leaves may be solitary, produced from the base of the plant. Individual leaves are generally compound, often with three leaflets, but also with more. Leaflets usually have spiny margins. The leaves may be annual, making the plant deciduous, or longer lasting, so that the plant is evergreen. The inflorescence is an open raceme or panicle, the number of flowers varying by species.

Individual flowers have parts in fours. There are four smaller outer sepals, usually greenish and shed when the flower opens. Moving inwards, they are followed by four larger petal-like inner sepals, often brightly colored. Inside the sepals are four true petals which may be small and flat, but often have a complex shape including a nectar-producing "spur" that may be longer than the sepals. There are four stamens.

One of the common names for the genus, bishop's hat, arises from the shape of the flowers, particularly where the spurs are longer than the sepals.

== Taxonomy ==
The genus was given its name by Carl Linnaeus in 1753, in describing the European species E. alpinum. The name is a Latinized version of a Greek name for an unidentified plant, epimedion, that is mentioned in Pliny's Natural History (xxvii.57). The meaning of the original name is unclear.

=== Species ===
As of November 2024, Plants of the World Online accepted the following species and naturally occurring hybrids:

- Epimedium acuminatum Franch.
- Epimedium alpinum L.
- Epimedium baiealiguizhouense S.Z.He & Y.K.Yang
- Epimedium baojingense Q.L.Chen & B.M.Yang
- Epimedium borealiguizhouense S.Z.He & Y.K.Yang
- Epimedium brevicornu Maxim.
- Epimedium campanulatum Ogisu
- Epimedium daiguii Cheng Zhang, B.L.Guo & Q.R.Liu
- Epimedium davidii Franch.
- Epimedium dewuense S.Z.He, Probst & W.F.Xu
- Epimedium diphyllum Lodd. ex Graham
- Epimedium dolichostemon Stearn
- Epimedium ecalcaratum G.Y.Zhong
- Epimedium elatum C.Morren & Decne.
- Epimedium elongatum Kom.
- Epimedium enshiense B.L.Guo & P.K.Hsiao
- Epimedium epsteinii Stearn
- Epimedium fangii Stearn
- Epimedium fargesii Franch.
- Epimedium flavum Stearn
- Epimedium franchetii Stearn
- Epimedium glandulosopilosum H.R.Liang
- Epimedium grandiflorum C.Morren
- Epimedium hunanense (Hand.-Mazz.) Hand.-Mazz.
- Epimedium ilicifolium Stearn
- Epimedium jinchengshanense Yanjun Zhang & J.Q.Li
- Epimedium jinfoshanensis H.P.Deng & Y.W.Zuo
- Epimedium jingzhouense G.H.Xia & G.Y.Li
- Epimedium koreanum Nakai
- Epimedium latisepalum Stearn
- Epimedium leptorrhizum Stearn
- Epimedium lishihchenii Stearn
- Epimedium lobophyllum L.H.Liu & B.G.Li
- Epimedium longnanense Yan J.Zhang
- Epimedium macrosepalum Stearn
- Epimedium mikinorii Stearn
- Epimedium muhuangense S.Z.He & Y.Y.Wang
- Epimedium multiflorum T.S.Ying
- Epimedium myrianthum Stearn
- Epimedium ogisui Stearn
- Epimedium × omeiense Stearn
- Epimedium parvifolium S.Z.He & T.L.Zhang
- Epimedium pauciflorum K.C.Yen
- Epimedium perralderianum Coss.
- Epimedium pinnatum Fisch. ex DC.
- Epimedium platypetalum K.Mey.
- Epimedium pseudowushanense B.L.Guo
- Epimedium pubescens Maxim.
- Epimedium pubigerum (DC.) C.Morren & Decne.
- Epimedium pudingense S.Z.He, Y.Y.Wang & B.L.Guo
- Epimedium qingchengshanense G.Y.Zhong & B.L.Guo
- Epimedium reticulatum C.Y.Wu ex S.Y.Bao
- Epimedium rhizomatosum Stearn
- Epimedium sagittatum (Siebold & Zucc.) Maxim.
- Epimedium sempervirens Nakai ex F.Maek.
- Epimedium × setosum Koidz.
- Epimedium shennongjiaense Yan J.Zhang & J.Q.Li
- Epimedium shuichengense S.Z.He
- Epimedium stearnii Ogisu & Rix
- Epimedium stellulatum Stearn
- Epimedium sutchuenense Franch.
- Epimedium tianmenshanense T.Deng, D.G.Zhang & H.Sun
- Epimedium trifoliolatobinatum (Koidz.) Koidz.
- Epimedium truncatum H.R.Liang
- Epimedium wushanense T.S.Ying
- Epimedium xichangense Yan J.Zhang
- Epimedium yinjiangense M.Y.Sheng & X.J.Tian
- Epimedium × youngianum Fisch. & C.A.Mey.
- Epimedium zhaotongense G.W.Hu
- Epimedium zhushanense K.F.Wu & S.X.Qian

=== Horticultural hybrids ===
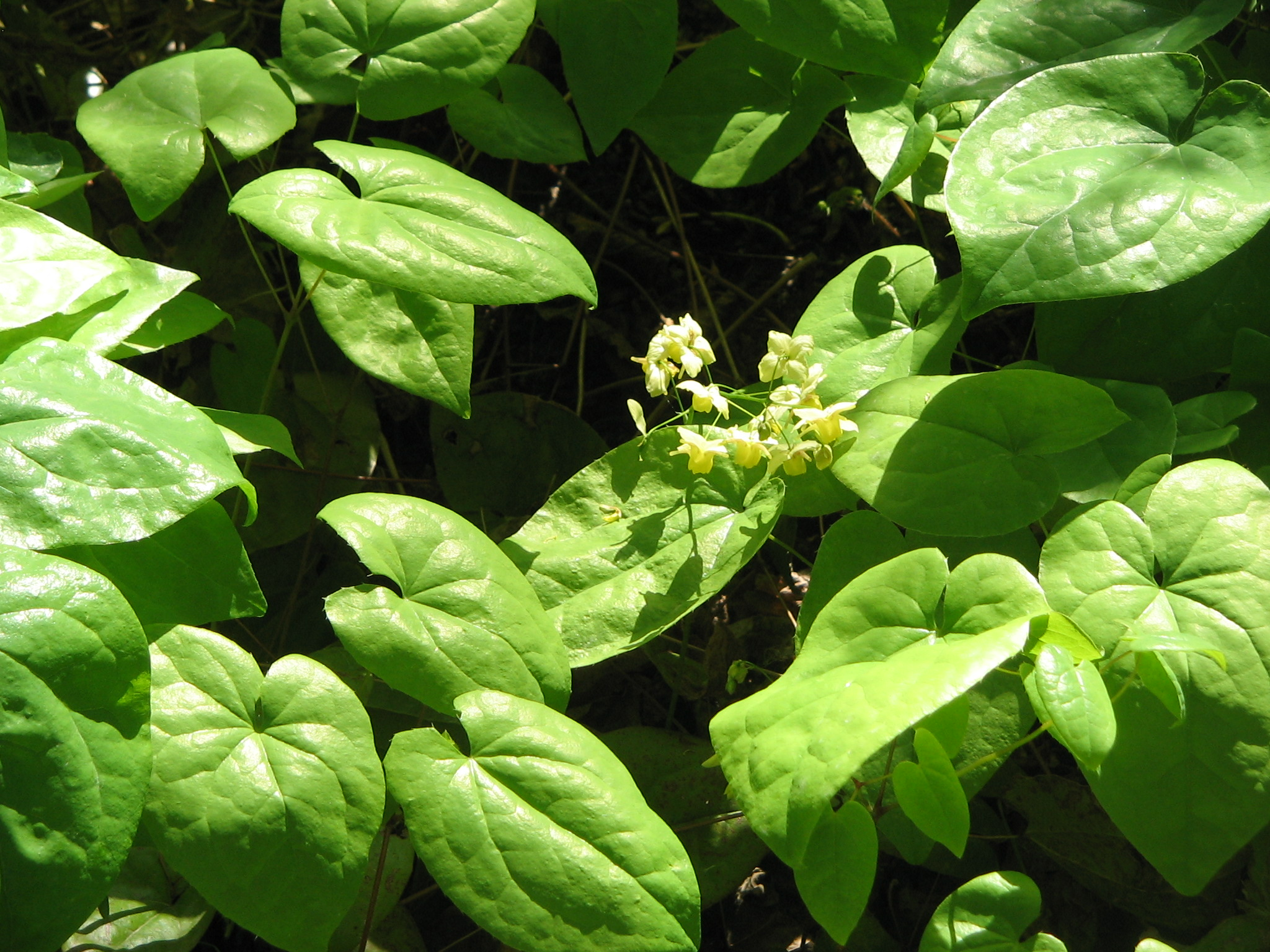
Epimedium × versicolor

Some artificial hybrids are cultivated in gardens. These include:

- E. × cantabrigiense Stearn, hybrid between E. alpinum and E. pubigerum
- E. × perralchicum Stearn, hybrid between E. perralderianum and E. pinnatum subsp. colchicum
- E. × rubrum Morr., hybrid between E. alpinum and E. grandiflorum
- E. × versicolor Morr., hybrid between E. grandiflorum and E. pinnatum subsp. colchicum
- E. × warleyense Stearn, hybrid between E. alpinum and E. pinnatum subsp. colchicum
- E. × youngianum Fisch & C.A.Mey, hybrid between E. diphyllum and E. grandiflorum

== Cultivation ==
Some varieties and hybrids have been in Western cultivation for the last 100 to 150 years. There is now a wide array of new Chinese species being cultivated in the West, many of which have only recently been discovered, and some of which have yet to be named. There are also many older Japanese hybrids and forms, extending the boundaries of the genus in cultivation. The majority of the Chinese species have not been fully tested for hardiness nor indeed for any other aspect of their culture. The initial assumption that the plants would only thrive where their native conditions could be closely replicated have proven to be overly cautious, as most varieties are proving extraordinarily amenable to general garden and container cultivation.

The cultivar 'Amber Queen' is a recipient of the Royal Horticultural Society's Award of Garden Merit.

=== Propagation ===
While they can be successfully propagated in early spring, epimediums are best divided in late summer, with the aim of promoting rapid re-growth of roots and shoots before the onset of winter. Several breeders (in particular Darrell Diano Probst, Tim Branney & Robin White) have also undertaken their own hybridization programmes with the genus. Various new nursery selections are gradually appearing in the horticulture trade, the best of which extend the colour and shape range of the flowers available to the gardener.

== Chemistry ==
Epimedium wushanense contains a number of flavonoids. 37 compounds were characterized from the underground and aerial parts of the plant. Among them, 28 compounds were prenylflavonoids. The predominant flavonoid, epimedin C, ranged from 1.4 to 5.1% in aerial parts and 1.0 to 2.8% in underground parts.

== General and cited references ==
- Stearn, William Thomas (November 1938). "Epimedium and Vancouveria (Berberidaceae), a monograph". Journal of the Linnean Society of London, Botany. 51 (340): 409–535. doi:10.1111/j.1095-8339.1937.tb01914.x.
- Stearn, William T. (2002) [1938]. Green, Peter Shaw; Mathew, Brian (eds.). The genus Epimedium and other herbaceous Berberidaceae. (including the genus podophyllum by Julian Shaw, illustrations by Christabel King) (Revised ed.). Kew: Royal Botanic Gardens. ISBN 9781842460399.
- Avent, Tony (March 2010). "An overview of Epimedium". The Plantsman: 10–17. Archived from the original on 2016-09-23.
- "Epimedium". The Plant List (2013). Version 1.1. 2013.
