= Cannflavin =

Cannflavins A and B
- Cannflavin A

- Cannflavin B

Names
- IUPAC names 6-[(2E)-3,7-Dimethylocta-2,6-dienyl]-5,7-dihydroxy-2-(4-hydroxy-3-methoxyphenyl)chromen-4-one (A); 5,7-Dihydroxy-2-(4-hydroxy-3-methoxyphenyl)-6-(3-methylbut-2-enyl)chromen-4-one (B)

Identifiers
CAS Number	(A): 76735-57-4; (B): 76735-58-5
3D model (JSmol)	(A): Interactive image; (B): Interactive image
ChEBI	(A): CHEBI:185375
ChEMBL	(A): ChEMBL4098732; (B): ChEMBL1985794
ChemSpider	(A): 8247235; (B): 357679
PubChem CID	(A): 10071695; (B): 403815
UNII	(A): GP8SR738HV; (B): KK2PPP6QRW
- InChI: (B): InChI=1S/C21H20O6/c1-11(2)4-6-13-15(23)9-19-20(21(13)25)16(24)10-17(27-19)12-5-7-14(22)18(8-12)26-3/h4-5,7-10,22-23,25H,6H2,1-3H3 Key: IXCUTZUASDSIJO-UHFFFAOYSA-N
- SMILES: (A): CC(=CCC/C(=C/CC1=C(C2=C(C=C1O)OC(=CC2=O)C3=CC(=C(C=C3)O)OC)O)/C)C; (B): CC(=CCC1=C(C2=C(C=C1O)OC(=CC2=O)C3=CC(=C(C=C3)O)OC)O)C

Properties
Chemical formula	C_{26}H_{28}O_{6} (A); C_{21}H_{20}O_{6} (B)
- Except where otherwise noted, data are given for materials in their standard state (at 25 °C [77 °F], 100 kPa). Infobox references

Cannflavins are a group of chemical compounds found in Cannabis sativa. Chemically, they are prenylflavonoids and are unrelated to THC and other cannabinoids. Cannflavins A and B were first identified in the 1980s and cannflavin C was identified in 2008.

Because cannflavins A and B are inhibitors of prostaglandin E2 production in vitro, the cannflavins have been studied for their potential use as anti-inflammatory agents.

== Biosynthesis ==
Cannflavins A and B are biosynthesized by prenylation of chrysoeriol.

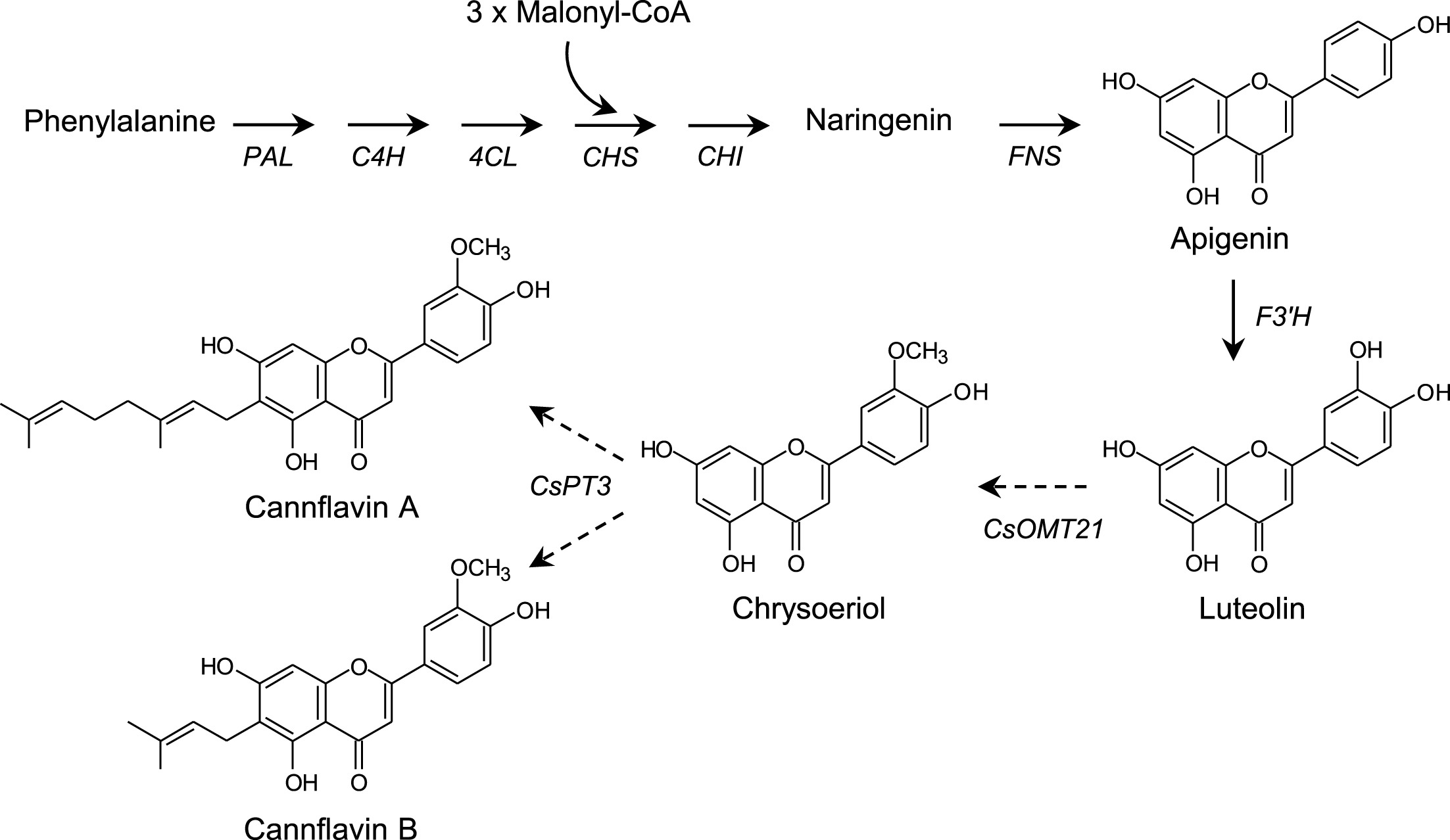
Biosynthetic pathway of cannflavins.
