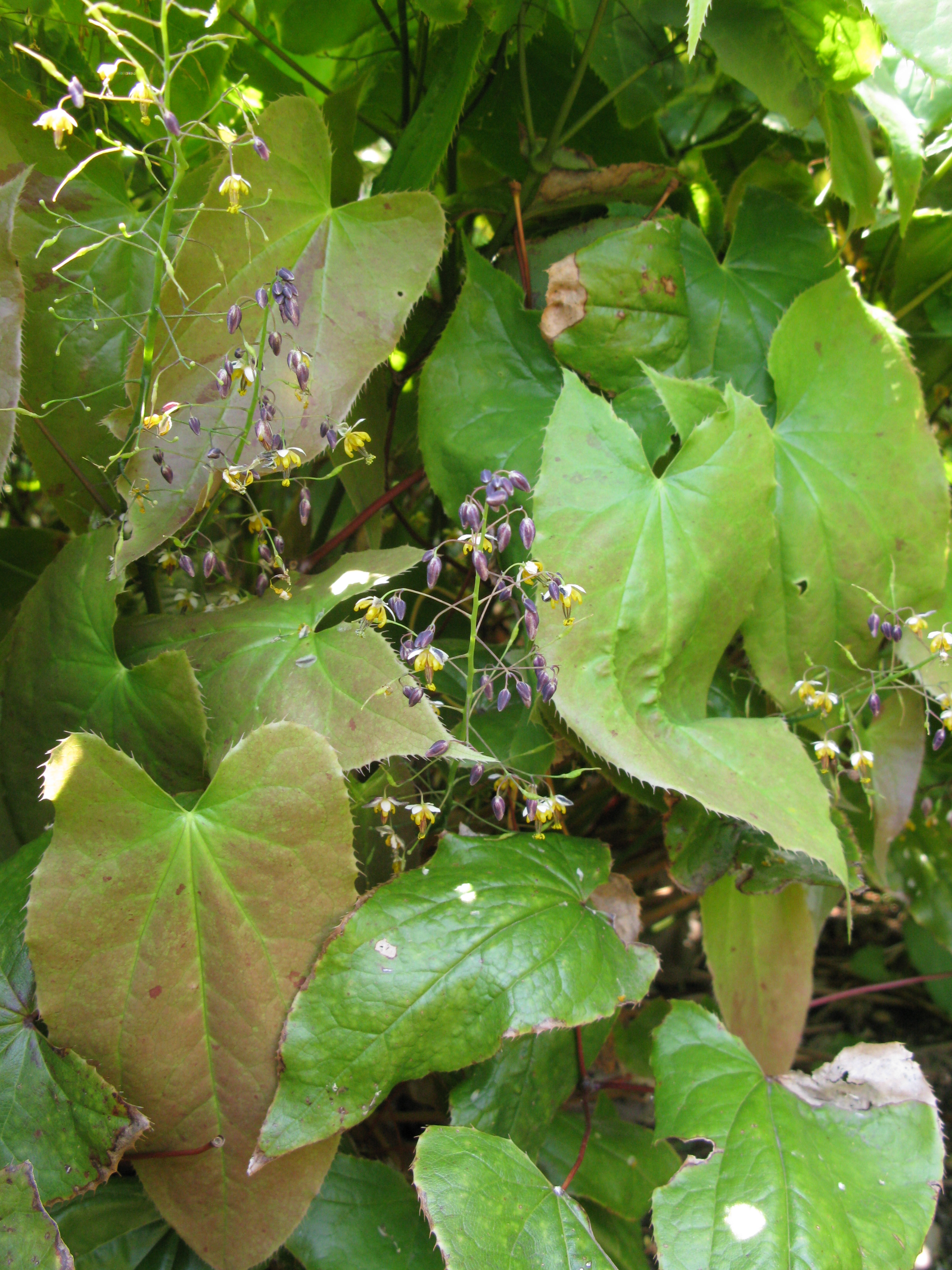
- At Koishikawa Botanical Garden

Scientific classification
- Kingdom: Plantae
- Clade: Tracheophytes
- Clade: Angiosperms
- Clade: Eudicots
- Order: Ranunculales
- Family: Berberidaceae
- Genus: Epimedium
- Species: E. sagittatum

Binomial name
- Epimedium sagittatum (Siebold & Zucc.) Maxim.

= Epimedium sagittatum =

Species of flowering plant

Epimedium sagittatum is a flowering plant in the barberry family (Berberidaceae) native to China. It is known locally as 三枝九叶草 and is sometimes called horny goat weed for its purported aphrodisiac properties.
