= Epimedium fargesii =

Scientific classification
- Kingdom: Plantae
- Clade: Embryophytes
- Clade: Tracheophytes
- Clade: Spermatophytes
- Clade: Angiosperms
- Clade: Eudicots
- Order: Ranunculales
- Family: Berberidaceae
- Genus: Epimedium
- Species: E. fargesii

Binomial name
- Epimedium fargesii Franch.

Species of flowering plant

Epimedium fargesii is a species of flowering plant in the family Berberidaceae, native to Sichuan and Hubei provinces of China. Its cultivar 'Pink Constellation' has gained the Royal Horticultural Society's Award of Garden Merit.
