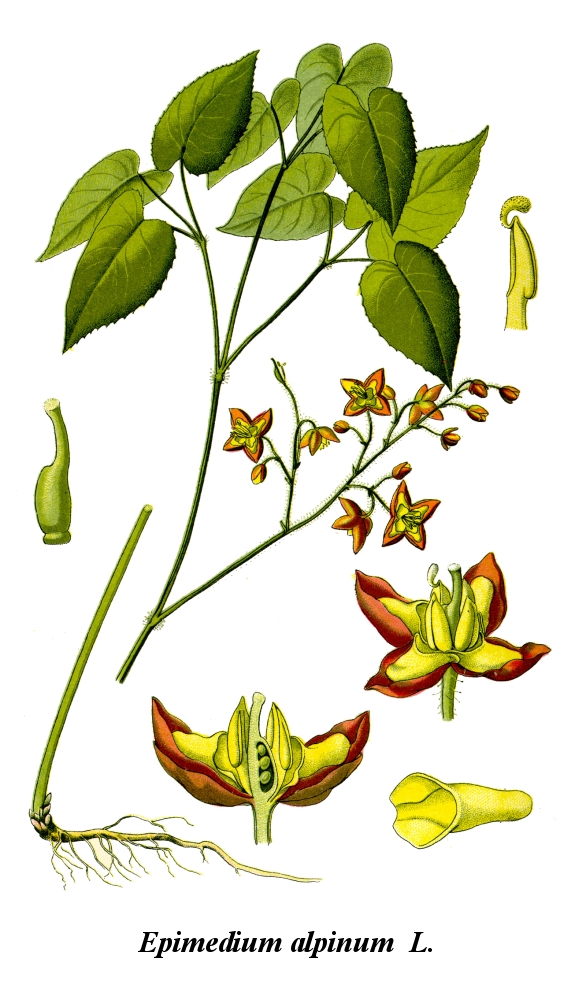
- Botanical illustration

Scientific classification
- Kingdom: Plantae
- Clade: Embryophytes
- Clade: Tracheophytes
- Clade: Spermatophytes
- Clade: Angiosperms
- Clade: Eudicots
- Order: Ranunculales
- Family: Berberidaceae
- Genus: Epimedium
- Species: E. alpinum

Binomial name
- Epimedium alpinum L.

= Epimedium alpinum =

Species of flowering plant

Epimedium alpinum, the alpine barrenwort, is a species of flowering plant in the genus Epimedium, native to the mountains of Italy, Austria, the former Yugoslavia, and Albania, and introduced into central Europe. A dwarf perennial suitable for rock gardens, it was jocularly said by John Lindley to be "known only in the gardens of botanists". Its hybrid with E. grandiflorum, Epimedium × rubrum, has gained the Royal Horticultural Society's Award of Garden Merit.
