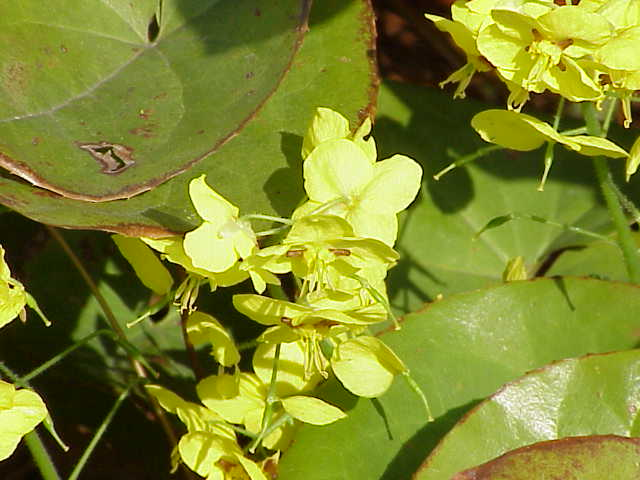

Scientific classification
- Kingdom: Plantae
- Clade: Tracheophytes
- Clade: Angiosperms
- Clade: Eudicots
- Order: Ranunculales
- Family: Berberidaceae
- Genus: Epimedium
- Species: E. pinnatum

Binomial name
- Epimedium pinnatum Fisch. ex DC.

Synonyms
- Epimedium pteroceras; Epimedium sieboldianum

= Epimedium pinnatum =

Species of flowering plant

Epimedium pinnatum is a species of flowering plant in the barberry family Berberidaceae, native to northern Iran. It is a slowly-spreading evergreen perennial growing to 30 cm (12 in) tall and broad, with oval hairy leaves and bright yellow spurred flowers in late spring and early summer.

The Latin specific epithet pinnatum means "with leaves growing on either side of the stalk".

The subspecies E. pinnatum subsp. colchicum has gained the Royal Horticultural Society's Award of Garden Merit. It is best grown in moist, fertile soil in a sheltered, partially-shaded spot, and is suitable for underplanting shrubs and trees.
