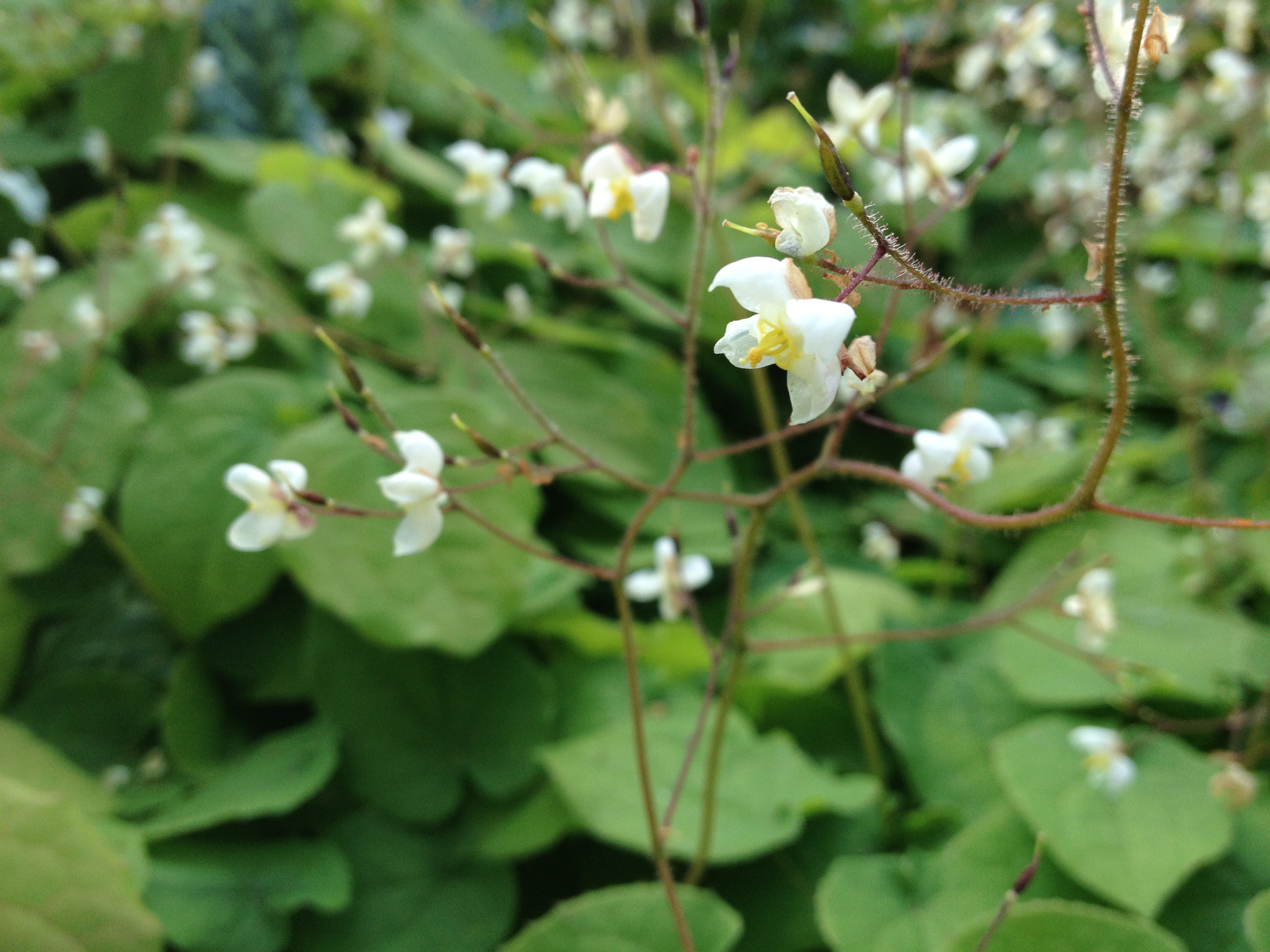

Scientific classification
- Kingdom: Plantae
- Clade: Tracheophytes
- Clade: Angiosperms
- Clade: Eudicots
- Order: Ranunculales
- Family: Berberidaceae
- Genus: Epimedium
- Species: E. pubigerum

Binomial name
- Epimedium pubigerum (DC.) C.Morren & Decne.

= Epimedium pubigerum =

Species of flowering plant

Epimedium pubigerum, also known by the common name hairy barrenwort, is a species in the family Berberidaceae.

== Description ==
- Height: Reaches up to 45 cm at maturity.
- Leaves: Heart-shaped, evergreen leaves are purplish bronze when young, turning dark glossy green with maturity.
- Flowers: In spring, sprays of creamy white or pink flowers are held high above the leaves by their long stems.

== Distribution and range ==
Epimedium pubigerum is native to southeastern Bulgaria and to the Transcaucasus region of Georgia, Armenia, and Azerbaijan.

== Habitat and cultivation ==
Epimedium pubigerum prefers a sheltered position away from cold winds, and flourishes in the shady, fertile conditions of deciduous woodland.
