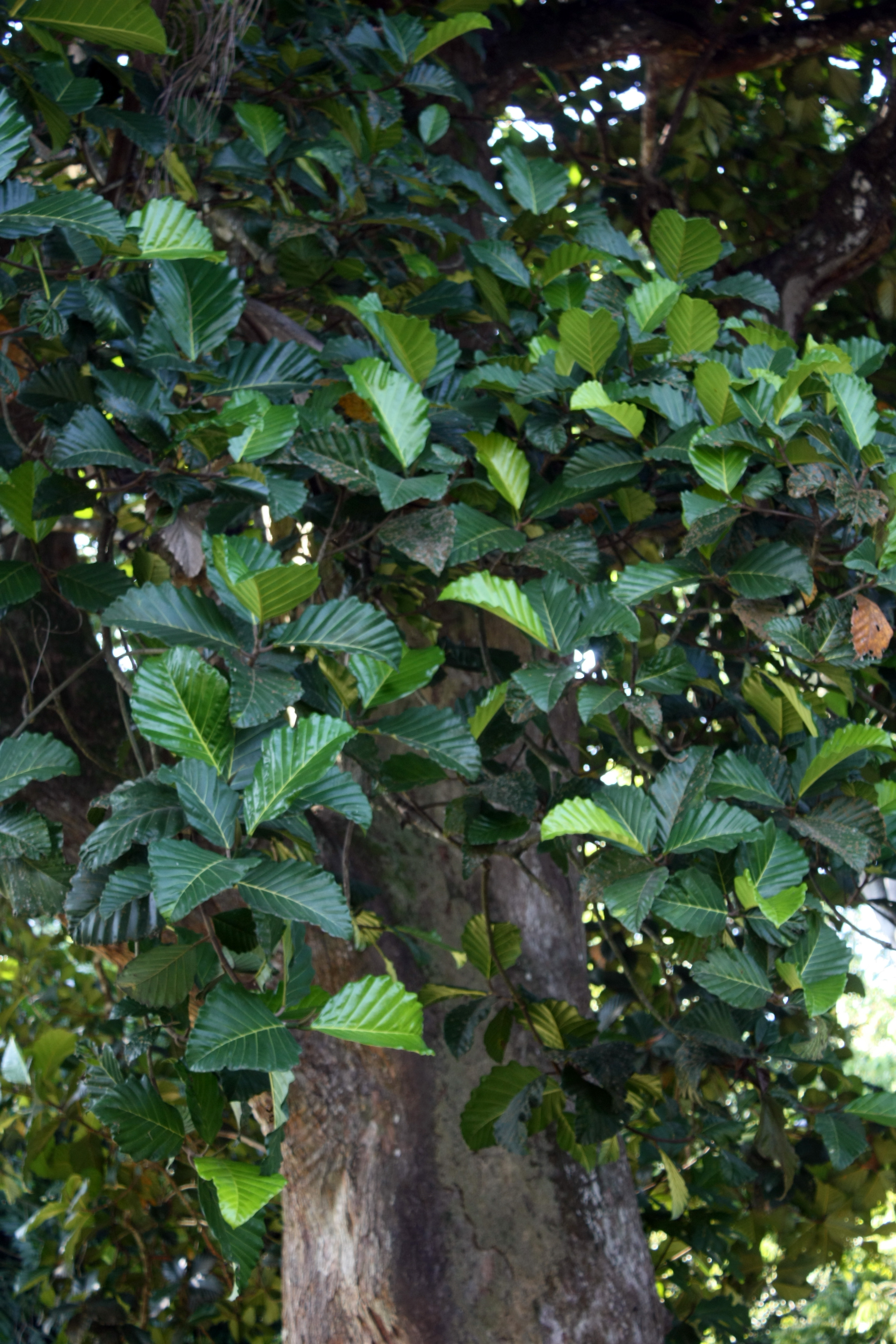

Conservation status
- Vulnerable (IUCN 2.3)

Scientific classification
- Kingdom: Plantae
- Clade: Tracheophytes
- Clade: Angiosperms
- Clade: Eudicots
- Clade: Rosids
- Order: Rosales
- Family: Moraceae
- Genus: Artocarpus
- Species: A. nobilis

Binomial name
- Artocarpus nobilis Thwaites

Synonyms
- Artocarpus imperialis André; Artocarpus pubescens Moon, not validly publ.; Saccus nobilis Kuntze

= Artocarpus nobilis =

Ceylon breadfruit

Species of flowering plant

Artocarpus nobilis, the Ceylon breadfruit, is a tree species in the family Moraceae. It is endemic to south western regions of Sri Lanka. It is known as wal dhel (වල් දෙල්), baedi dhel (බැදි දෙල්) or hingala dhel (හිංගල දෙල්) by local people.

The plant is known to be infected by Rigidoporus microporus to cause white root disease. This is the first time that the pathogen was found instead of Hevea brasiliensis.

== Description ==
Ceylon breadfruit is an evergreen plant with about 25m height. The seeds and fruits are used for medicinal purposes for the worm diseases caused by nematode Ascaris lumbricoides.

== Chemistry ==
Artocarpus nobilis contains prenylated flavonoids, xanthonoids in its root bark, geranylated phenolic compounds in its fruits, geranyl chalcones in its leaves and pyranodihydrobenzoxanthones isolated from the bark.
