= 7-O-Methylluteone =

Names
- IUPAC name 2′,4′,5-Trihydroxy-7-methoxy-6-(3-methylbut-2-en-1-yl)isoflavone
- Systematic IUPAC name 3-(2,4-Dihydroxyphenyl)-5-hydroxy-7-methoxy-6-(3-methylbut-2-en-1-yl)-4H-1-benzopyran-4-one

Identifiers
CAS Number	122290-50-0
3D model (JSmol)	Interactive image
ChEBI	CHEBI:27430
ChemSpider	390023
KEGG	C07290
PubChem CID	441251
UNII	ST6SCG8ZUC
CompTox Dashboard (EPA)	DTXSID00331568
- InChI: InChI=1S/C21H20O6/c1-11(2)4-6-14-17(26-3)9-18-19(20(14)24)21(25)15(10-27-18)13-7-5-12(22)8-16(13)23/h4-5,7-10,22-24H,6H2,1-3H3 Key: AZPLXDBZIQMMMT-UHFFFAOYSA-N; InChI=1/C21H20O6/c1-11(2)4-6-14-17(26-3)9-18-19(20(14)24)21(25)15(10-27-18)13-7-5-12(22)8-16(13)23/h4-5,7-10,22-24H,6H2,1-3H3 Key: AZPLXDBZIQMMMT-UHFFFAOYAB
- SMILES: CC(=CCC1=C(C=C2C(=C1O)C(=O)C(=CO2)C3=C(C=C(C=C3)O)O)OC)C

Properties
Chemical formula	C_{21}H_{20}O_{6}
Molar mass	368.385 g·mol^{−1}
- Except where otherwise noted, data are given for materials in their standard state (at 25 °C [77 °F], 100 kPa). Infobox references

7-O-Methylluteone is a prenylated isoflavone. It can be found in the bark of Erythrina burttii.

The enzyme monoprenyl isoflavone epoxidase uses 7-O-methylluteone, NADPH, H^{+} and O_{2} to produce a dihydrofurano pyranoisoflavone derivative, NADP^{+} and H_{2}O.
