= Karanjachromene =

- Chemical structure of karanjachromene

Names
- IUPAC name 3-Methoxy-6′′,6′′-dimethyl-6′′H-pyrano[2′′,3′′:7,8]flavone
- Systematic IUPAC name 3-Methoxy-8,8-dimethyl-2-phenyl-4H,8H-(benzo[1,2-b:3,4-b′]dipyran)-4-one

Identifiers
CAS Number	38070-93-8
3D model (JSmol)	Interactive image
ChEMBL	ChEMBL2204384
ChemSpider	22370267
PubChem CID	14033983
UNII	4J8H5LNY6T
CompTox Dashboard (EPA)	DTXSID701029319
- InChI: InChI=1S/C21H18O4/c1-21(2)12-11-14-16(25-21)10-9-15-17(22)20(23-3)18(24-19(14)15)13-7-5-4-6-8-13/h4-12H,1-3H3 Key: QCLBGWSAIHOGCA-UHFFFAOYSA-N; InChI=1/C21H18O4/c1-21(2)12-11-14-16(25-21)10-9-15-17(22)20(23-3)18(24-19(14)15)13-7-5-4-6-8-13/h4-12H,1-3H3 Key: QCLBGWSAIHOGCA-UHFFFAOYAI
- SMILES: COc1c(=O)c2ccc3OC(C)(C)C=Cc3c2oc1-c4ccccc4

Properties
Chemical formula	C_{21}H_{18}O_{4}
Molar mass	334.36 g/mol
- Except where otherwise noted, data are given for materials in their standard state (at 25 °C [77 °F], 100 kPa). verify (what is ?) Infobox references

Karanjachromene is a pyranoflavonol, a type of flavonol. It is a fluorescent pyranoflavonoid isolated from the seed oil of Millettia pinnata.
