= Pyranoflavonoid =

Class of chemical compounds

The pyranoflavonoids are a type of flavonoids possessing a pyran group.

Cyclocommunin is another natural pyranoflavonoid.

== Pyranoisoflavones ==
- Alpinumisoflavone
- Di-O-methylalpinumisoflavone
- 4'-methyl-alpinumisoflavone
- 5,3′,4′-trihydroxy-2″,2″-dimethylpyrano (5″,6″:7,8) isoflavone - has antifungal properties, and is from the plant species ficus tikoua Bur.

The enzyme monoprenyl isoflavone epoxidase produces a dihydrofurano pyranoisoflavone derivative from 7-O-methylluteone.

== Pyranoflavonols ==
- Karanjachromene
