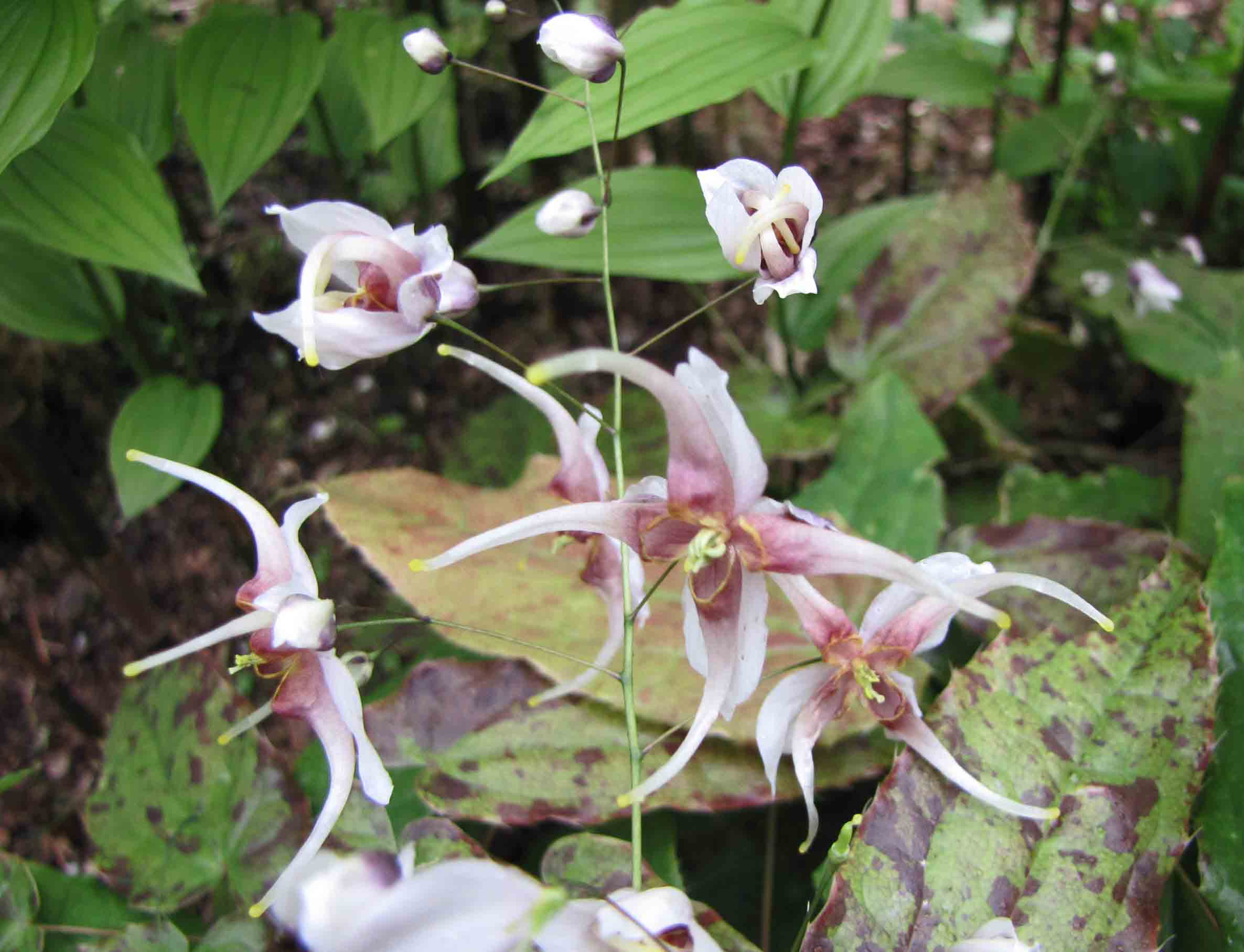
- Blossoms

Scientific classification
- Kingdom: Plantae
- Clade: Embryophytes
- Clade: Tracheophytes
- Clade: Spermatophytes
- Clade: Angiosperms
- Clade: Eudicots
- Order: Ranunculales
- Family: Berberidaceae
- Genus: Epimedium
- Species: E. acuminatum

Binomial name
- Epimedium acuminatum Franch.

Synonyms
- Epimedium chlorandrum Stearn; Epimedium komarovii H.Lév.; Epimedium simplicifolium T.S.Ying

= Epimedium acuminatum =

Species of flowering plant

Epimedium acuminatum, called the acuminate barrenwort, is a species of flowering plant in the genus Epimedium, native to south-central and southeast China. It has gained the Royal Horticultural Society's Award of Garden Merit.
