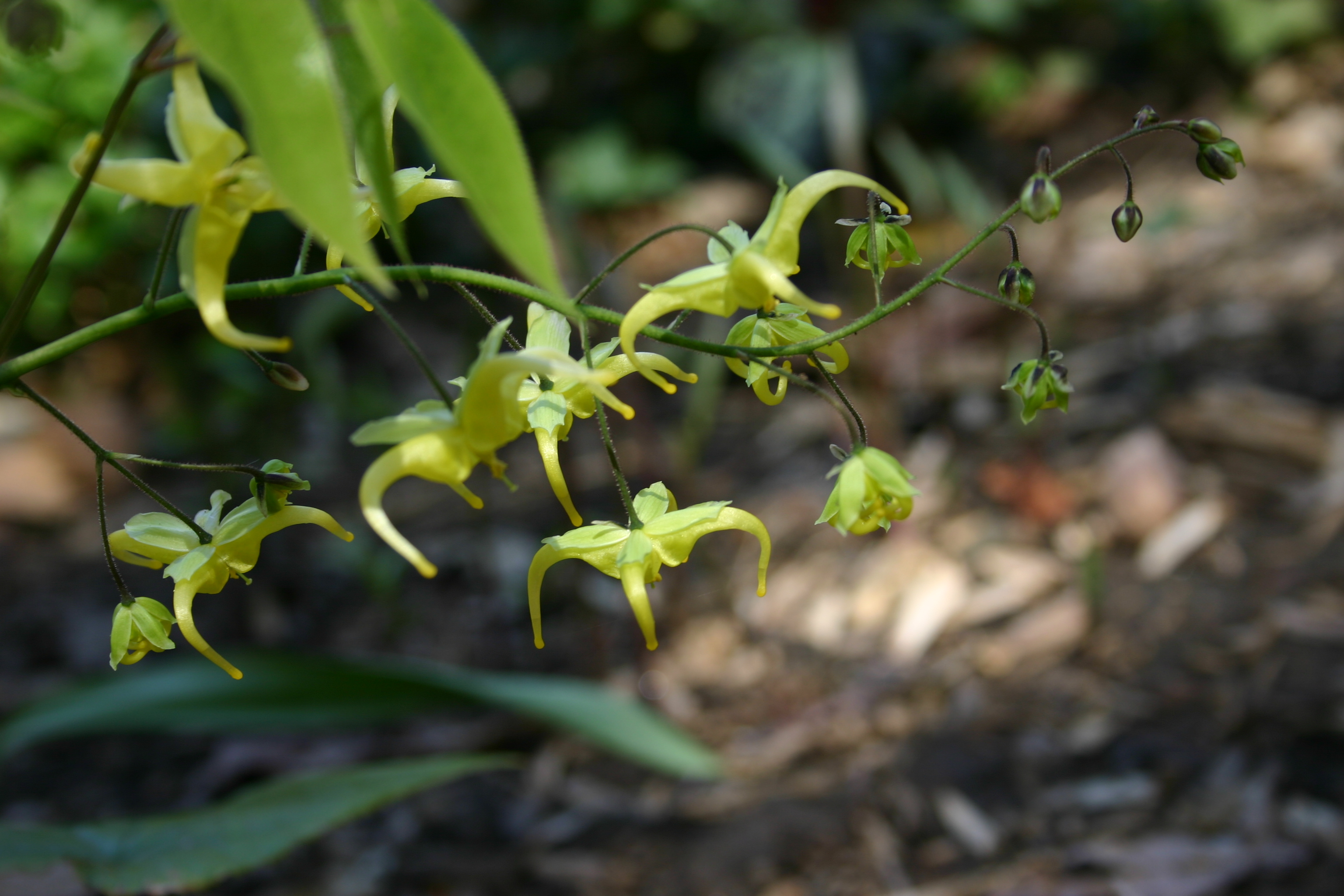
- Inflorescence

Scientific classification
- Kingdom: Plantae
- Clade: Embryophytes
- Clade: Tracheophytes
- Clade: Spermatophytes
- Clade: Angiosperms
- Clade: Eudicots
- Order: Ranunculales
- Family: Berberidaceae
- Genus: Epimedium
- Species: E. franchetii

Binomial name
- Epimedium franchetii Stearn

= Epimedium franchetii =

Species of flowering plant

Epimedium franchetii is a species of flowering plant in the family Berberidaceae, native to Hubei and Guizhou provinces of China. Its cultivar 'Brimstone Butterfly' has gained the Royal Horticultural Society's Award of Garden Merit.
