= Prenylflavonoid =

Chemical structure of 8-prenylnaringenin, a prenylated flavanone found in hops

Prenylated flavonoids or prenylflavonoids are a sub-class of flavonoids. They are widely distributed throughout the plant kingdom. Some are known to have phytoestrogenic or antioxidant properties. They are given in the list of adaptogens in herbalism. Chemically they have a prenyl group attached to their flavonoid backbone. It is usually assumed that the addition of hydrophobic prenyl groups facilitate attachment to cell membranes. Prenylation may increase the potential activity of its original flavonoid.

Monoprenyl isoflavone epoxidase is a key enzyme in fungal Botrytis cinerea metabolism of prenylated flavonoids.

Many prenylflavonoids appear to have anticancer activity in vitro.

Prenylchalcones, prenylflavones, prenylflavonols and prenylflavanones are classes of prenylflavonoids.

== Examples ==
6-Prenylnaringenin, 6-geranylnaringenin, 8-prenylnaringenin and isoxanthohumol can be found in hops and beer. Of the prenylflavonoids, 8-prenylnaringenin is the most potent phytoestrogen known.

Australone A can be found in Morus australis.

6,8-Diprenyleriodictyol, dorsmanin C and dorsmanin F can be found in Dorstenia mannii.

Epimedium wushanense contains a number of flavanoids. 37 compounds were characterized from the underground and aerial parts of the plant. Among them, 28 compounds were prenylflavonoids. The predominant prenylated flavonoid, epimedin C, ranged from 1.4 to 5.1% in aerial parts and 1.0 to 2.8% in underground parts.

Artocarpus nobilis contains prenylated flavonoids in its root bark.

8-Prenylkaempferol can be found in Sophora flavescens.

Cannflavins are prenylflavonoids found in Cannabis sativa.

== Prenylated isoflavonoids ==
A number of bio-active chemicals have been reported from Millettia pachycarpa including several prenylflavonoids. Several chemical analyses have yielded a number of novel prenylated isoflavones including erysenegalensein E, euchrenone b10, isoerysenegalensein E, 6,8-diprenylorobol, furowanin A and B, millewanins-F, G and H, warangalone, and auriculasin from the leaves.

7-O-Methylluteone is a prenylated isoflavone. It can be found in the bark of Erythrina burttii.

Luteone is another prenylated isoflavone found in the pods of Laburnum anagyroides.

Wighteone (6-prenylgenistein), isowighteone (3′-prenylgenistein), and lupiwighteone (8-prenylgenistein) are genistein prenylated derivatives.
