= Isorhamnetin =

- Isorhamnetin structure

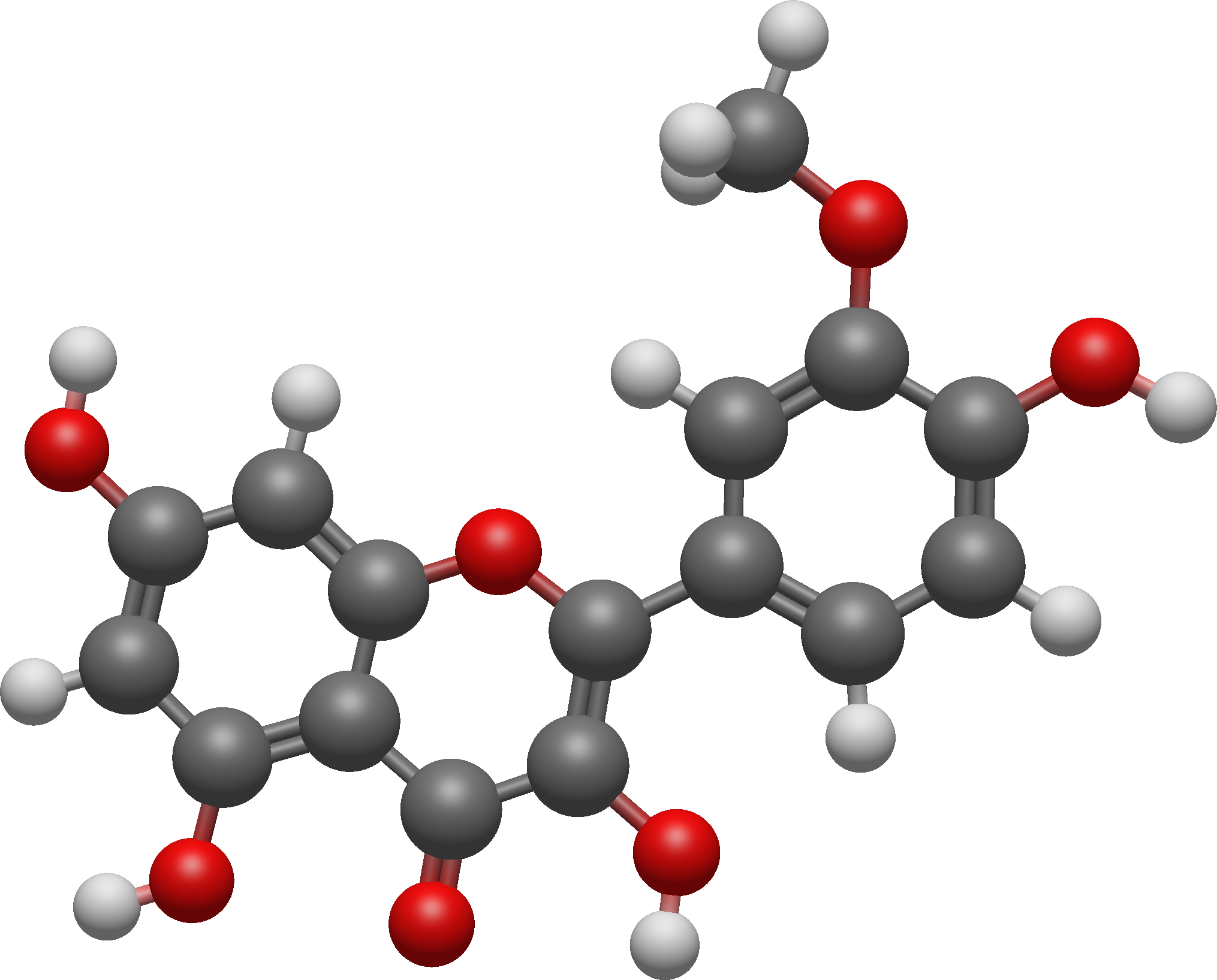
- Isorhamnetin 3D structure

Names
- IUPAC name 3,4′,5,7-Tetrahydroxy-3′-methoxyflavone
- Systematic IUPAC name 3,5,7-Trihydroxy-2-(4-hydroxy-3-methoxyphenyl)-4H-1-benzopyran-4-one
- Other names 3-methylquercetin 3-Methylquercetin; Isorhamnetol isorhamentin isorhamnetine iso-rhamnetin 3'-Methoxyquercetin

Identifiers
| CAS Number | 480-19-3 |
| 3D model (JSmol) | Interactive image |
| ChEBI | CHEBI:6052 |
| ChEMBL | ChEMBL379064 |
| ChemSpider | 4444973 |
| ECHA InfoCard | 100.006.860 |
| KEGG | C10084 |
| PubChem CID | 5281654 |
| UNII | 07X3IB4R4Z |
| CompTox Dashboard (EPA) | DTXSID10197379 |
- InChI: InChI=1S/C16H12O7/c1-22-11-4-7(2-3-9(11)18)16-15(21)14(20)13-10(19)5-8(17)6-12(13)23-16/h2-6,17-19,21H,1H3 Key: IZQSVPBOUDKVDZ-UHFFFAOYSA-N; InChI=1/C16H12O7/c1-22-11-4-7(2-3-9(11)18)16-15(21)14(20)13-10(19)5-8(17)6-12(13)23-16/h2-6,17-19,21H,1H3 Key: IZQSVPBOUDKVDZ-UHFFFAOYAD
- SMILES: COC1=C(C=CC(=C1)C2=C(C(=O)C3=C(C=C(C=C3O2)O)O)O)O

Properties
| Chemical formula | C_{16}H_{12}O_{7} |
| Molar mass | 316.26 g/mol |
| Melting point | 307 °C (585 °F; 580 K) |
- Except where otherwise noted, data are given for materials in their standard state (at 25 °C [77 °F], 100 kPa). verify (what is ?) Infobox references

Isorhamnetin is an O-methylated flavonol from the class of flavonoids. It is a 3'-methoxylated derivative of quercetin.

== Sources ==
A common food source of isorhamnetin and its glucoside conjugates are pungent yellow or red onions, in which it is a minor pigment, quercetin-3,4'-diglucoside and quercetin-4'-glucoside and the aglycone quercetin being the major pigments. Pears, olive oil, wine and tomato sauce are rich in isorhamnetin. Almond skin is a rich source of isorhamnetin-3-O-rutinoside and isorhamnetin-3-O-glucoside, in some cultivars they comprise 75% of the polyphenol content, the total of which can exceed 10 mg/100 gram almond. Others sources include the spice, herbal medicinal and psychoactive Mexican tarragon (Tagetes lucida), which is described as accumulating isorhamnetin and its 7-O-glucoside derivate. Nopal (Opuntia ficus-indica (L.)) is also a good source of isorhamnetin, which can be extracted by supercritical fluid extraction assisted by enzymes. It is also present in Oenanthe javanica, better known as Java water dropwort or Minari.

== Biosynthesis and metabolism ==
The enzyme luteolin O-methyltransferase uses S-adenosyl methionine to methylate the flavanol, quercetin, giving isorhamnetin.

The enzyme 3-methylquercetin 7-O-methyltransferase further methylates isorhamnetin to produce rhamnazin.

Isorhamnetin is an inhibitor of CYP1B1.

== Glycosides ==
- Isorhamnetin-3-O-rutinoside-7-O-glucoside
- Isorhamnetin-3-O-rutinoside-4'-O-glucoside
- Narcissin (Isorhamnetin-3-O-rutinoside)

== See also ==
- List of antioxidants in food
- List of phytochemicals in food
- Tamarixetin, the 4'-methyl analog
