= Icariin =

Names
- IUPAC name 7-(β-D-Glucopyranosyloxy)-5-hydroxy-4′-methoxy-8-(3-methylbut-2-en-1-yl)-3-(α-L-rhamnopyranosyloxy)flavone
- Systematic IUPAC name 5-Hydroxy-2-(4-methoxyphenyl)-8-(3-methylbut-2-en-1-yl)-7-{[(2S,3R,4S,5S,6R)-3,4,5-trihydroxy-6-(hydroxymethyl)oxan-2-yl]oxy}-3-{[(2S,3R,4R,5R,6S)-3,4,5-trihydroxy-6-methyloxan-2-yl]oxy}-4H-1-benzopyran-4-one

Identifiers
CAS Number	489-32-7
3D model (JSmol)	Interactive image
ChEBI	CHEBI:78420
ChEMBL	ChEMBL553204
ChemSpider	4477421
ECHA InfoCard	100.107.649
PubChem CID	5318997
UNII	VNM47R2QSQ
CompTox Dashboard (EPA)	DTXSID00964133
- InChI: InChI=1S/C33H40O15/c1-13(2)5-10-17-19(45-33-28(42)26(40)23(37)20(12-34)46-33)11-18(35)21-24(38)31(48-32-27(41)25(39)22(36)14(3)44-32)29(47-30(17)21)15-6-8-16(43-4)9-7-15/h5-9,11,14,20,22-23,25-28,32-37,39-42H,10,12H2,1-4H3/t14-,20+,22-,23+,25+,26-,27+,28+,32-,33+/m0/s1 Key: TZJALUIVHRYQQB-XLRXWWTNSA-N; InChI=1/C33H40O15/c1-13(2)5-10-17-19(45-33-28(42)26(40)23(37)20(12-34)46-33)11-18(35)21-24(38)31(48-32-27(41)25(39)22(36)14(3)44-32)29(47-30(17)21)15-6-8-16(43-4)9-7-15/h5-9,11,14,20,22-23,25-28,32-37,39-42H,10,12H2,1-4H3/t14-,20+,22-,23+,25+,26-,27+,28+,32-,33+/m0/s1 Key: TZJALUIVHRYQQB-XLRXWWTNBA
- SMILES: O=C3C(\O[C@@H]1O[C@H]([C@H](O)[C@@H](O)[C@H]1O)C)=C(/Oc4c(c(O[C@@H]2O[C@H](CO)[C@@H](O)[C@H](O)[C@H]2O)cc(O)c34)C\C=C(/C)C)c5ccc(OC)cc5

Properties
Chemical formula	C_{33}H_{40}O_{15}
Molar mass	676.668 g·mol^{−1}
- Except where otherwise noted, data are given for materials in their standard state (at 25 °C [77 °F], 100 kPa). verify (what is ?) Infobox references

Icariin is a chemical compound classified as a prenylated flavonol glycoside, a type of flavonoid. It is the 8-prenyl derivative of kaempferol 3,7-O-diglucoside. The compound has been isolated from several species of plant belonging to the genus Epimedium which are commonly known as horny goat weed, Yin Yang Huo, and Herba epimedii. Extracts from these plants produce aphrodisiac effects, and are used in traditional Chinese medicine to enhance erectile function.
