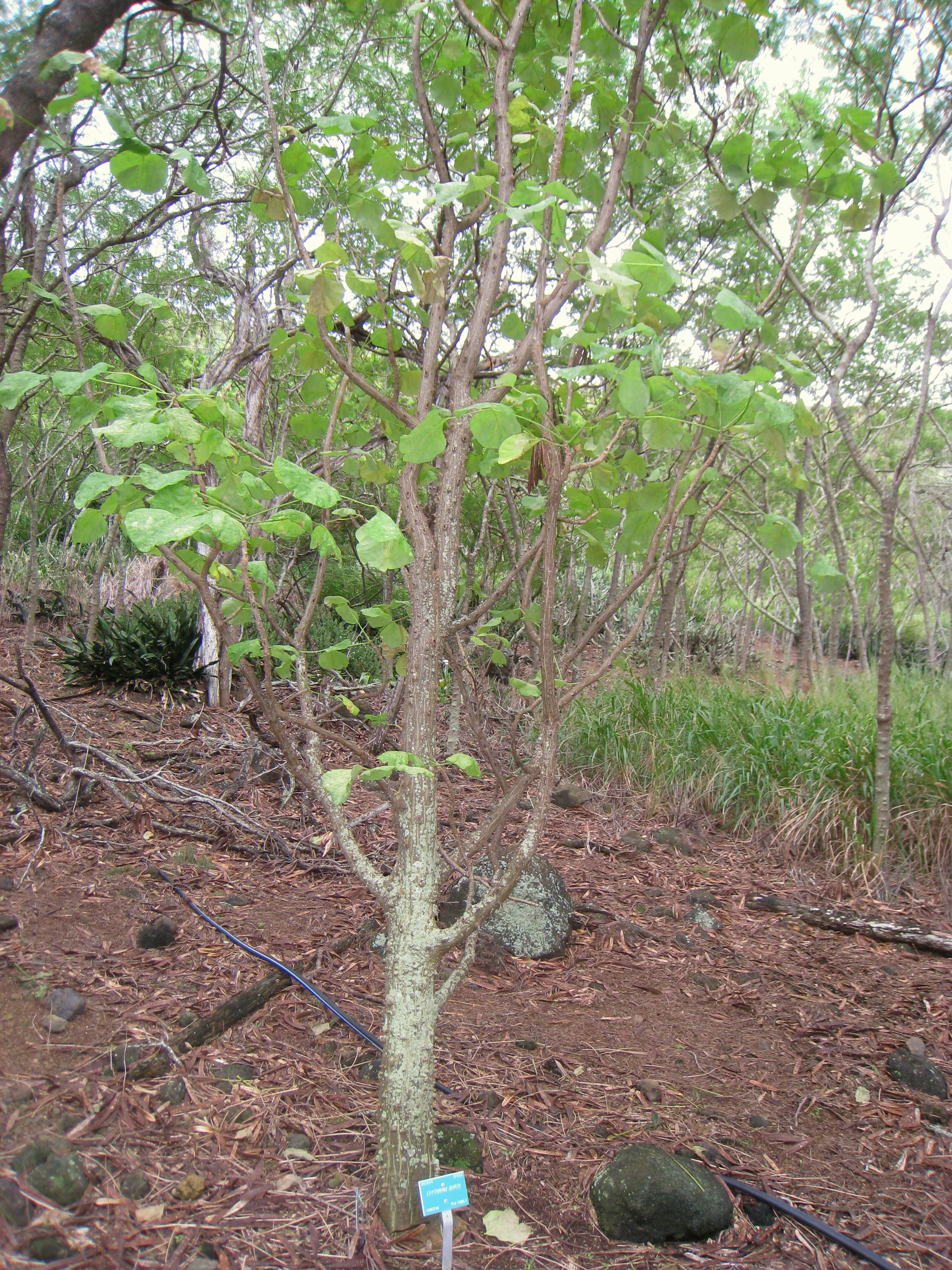

Scientific classification
- Kingdom: Plantae
- Clade: Tracheophytes
- Clade: Angiosperms
- Clade: Eudicots
- Clade: Rosids
- Order: Fabales
- Family: Fabaceae
- Subfamily: Faboideae
- Genus: Erythrina
- Species: E. burttii

Binomial name
- Erythrina burttii Baker f.

= Erythrina burttii =

Species of legume

Erythrina burttii is a flowering plant species in the genus of Erythrina found in Kenya and Ethiopia.

E. burttii contains flavonoids with antimicrobial properties. 7-O-Methylluteone, a prenylated isoflavone, can be found in the bark. The isoflav-3-enes burttinol-A and burttinol-C, and the 2-arylbenzofuran derivative burttinol-D, also found in the root bark, show an antiplasmodial activity.
