= Tamarixetin =

Names
- IUPAC name 3,3′,5,7-Tetrahydroxy-4′-methoxyflavone
- Systematic IUPAC name 3,5,7-Trihydroxy-2-(3-hydroxy-4-methoxyphenyl)-4H-1-benzopyran-4-one
- Other names 4'-Methylquercetin; 4'-O-Methylquercetin; Quercetin 4'-methyl ether

Identifiers
CAS Number	603-61-2
3D model (JSmol)	Interactive image
ChEBI	CHEBI:67492
ChemSpider	4445016
ECHA InfoCard	100.009.137
PubChem CID	5281699
UNII	73WRA8Z8M8
CompTox Dashboard (EPA)	DTXSID00209056
- InChI: InChI=1S/C16H12O7/c1-22-11-3-2-7(4-9(11)18)16-15(21)14(20)13-10(19)5-8(17)6-12(13)23-16/h2-6,17-19,21H,1H3 Key: FPLMIPQZHHQWHN-UHFFFAOYSA-N; InChI=1/C16H12O7/c1-22-11-3-2-7(4-9(11)18)16-15(21)14(20)13-10(19)5-8(17)6-12(13)23-16/h2-6,17-19,21H,1H3 Key: FPLMIPQZHHQWHN-UHFFFAOYAK
- SMILES: COC1=CC=C(C=C1O)C1=C(O)C(=O)C2=C(O1)C=C(O)C=C2O

Properties
Chemical formula	C_{16}H_{12}O_{7}
Molar mass	316.265 g·mol^{−1}
Melting point	307 °C (585 °F; 580 K)
- Except where otherwise noted, data are given for materials in their standard state (at 25 °C [77 °F], 100 kPa). Infobox references

Tamarixetin is an O-methylated flavonol, a naturally occurring flavonoid. It has been isolated from Tamarix ramosissima.

== See also ==
- Isorhamnetin, the 3'-methyl analog
- List of antioxidants in food
- List of phytochemicals in food
