= Monoprenyl isoflavone epoxidase =

Class of enzymes

monoprenyl isoflavone epoxidase

Identifiers
- EC no.: 1.14.99.34

Databases
- IntEnz: IntEnz view
- BRENDA: BRENDA entry
- ExPASy: NiceZyme view
- KEGG: KEGG entry
- MetaCyc: metabolic pathway
- PRIAM: profile
- PDB structures: RCSB PDB PDBe PDBsum
- Gene Ontology: AmiGO / QuickGO
Search
- PMC: articles
- PubMed: articles
- NCBI: proteins

In enzymology, a monoprenyl isoflavone epoxidase (EC 1.14.99.34) is an enzyme that catalyzes the chemical reaction

7-O-methylluteone + NADPH + H^{+} + O_{2} $\rightleftharpoons$ dihydrofurano derivatives + NADP^{+} + H_{2}O

The 4 substrates of this enzyme are 7-O-methylluteone, NADPH, H^{+}, and O_{2}, whereas its 3 products are dihydrofurano pyranoisoflavone derivative, NADP^{+}, and H_{2}O.

This enzyme belongs to the family of oxidoreductases, specifically those acting on paired donors, with O2 as oxidant and incorporation or reduction of oxygen. The oxygen incorporated need not be derive from O miscellaneous. The systematic name of this enzyme class is 7-O-methylluteone,NADPH:O2 oxidoreductase. Other names in common use include monoprenyl isoflavone monooxygenase, and 7-O-methylluteone:O2 oxidoreductase.
