= Chrysoeriol =

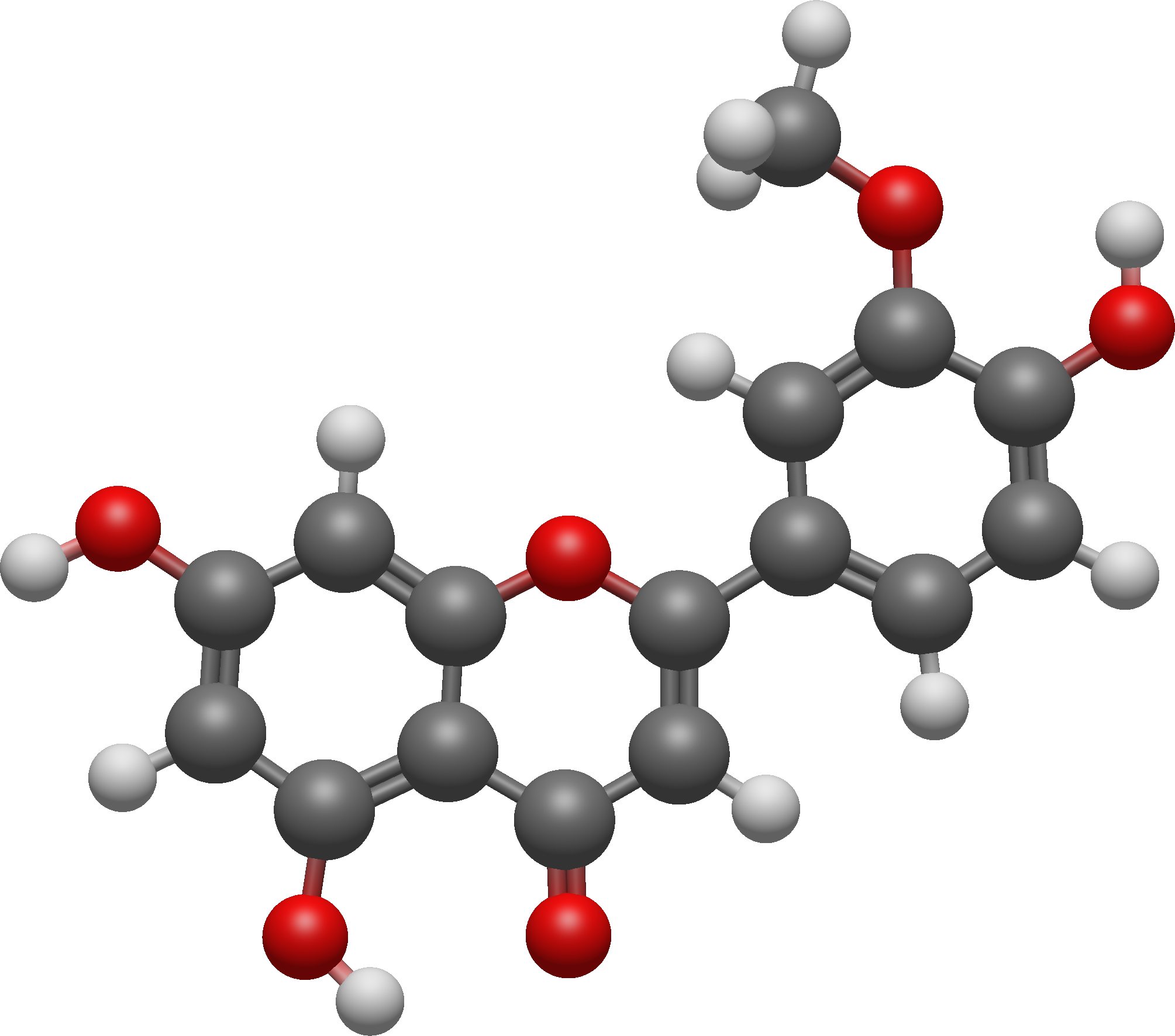

Names
- IUPAC name 4′,5,7-Trihydroxy-3′-methoxyflavone
- Systematic IUPAC name 5,7-Dihydroxy-2-(4-hydroxy-3-methoxyphenyl)-4H-1-benzopyran-4-one

Identifiers
CAS Number	491-71-4
3D model (JSmol)	Interactive image
ChemSpider	4444263
ECHA InfoCard	100.007.039
PubChem CID	5280666
UNII	Q813145M20
CompTox Dashboard (EPA)	DTXSID60197687
- InChI: InChI=1S/C16H12O6/c1-21-14-4-8(2-3-10(14)18)13-7-12(20)16-11(19)5-9(17)6-15(16)22-13/h2-7,17-19H,1H3 Key: SCZVLDHREVKTSH-UHFFFAOYSA-N; InChI=1/C16H12O6/c1-21-14-4-8(2-3-10(14)18)13-7-12(20)16-11(19)5-9(17)6-15(16)22-13/h2-7,17-19H,1H3 Key: SCZVLDHREVKTSH-UHFFFAOYAS
- SMILES: COC1=C(C=CC(=C1)C2=CC(=O)C3=C(C=C(C=C3O2)O)O)O

Properties
Chemical formula	C_{16}H_{12}O_{6}
Molar mass	300.266 g·mol^{−1}
- Except where otherwise noted, data are given for materials in their standard state (at 25 °C [77 °F], 100 kPa). Infobox references

Chrysoeriol is a flavone, chemically the 3'-methoxy derivative of luteolin.

== Related compounds ==
Diosmetin is one of three possible regioisomers of chrysoeriol.

== Natural sources ==
Found in Artemisia.

== Pharmacodynamics ==
Vasorelaxant and hypotensive activity in vitro and in vivo in a murine model by intravenous infusion.

== See also ==
- Cannflavins, prenylated derivatives of chrysoeriol
