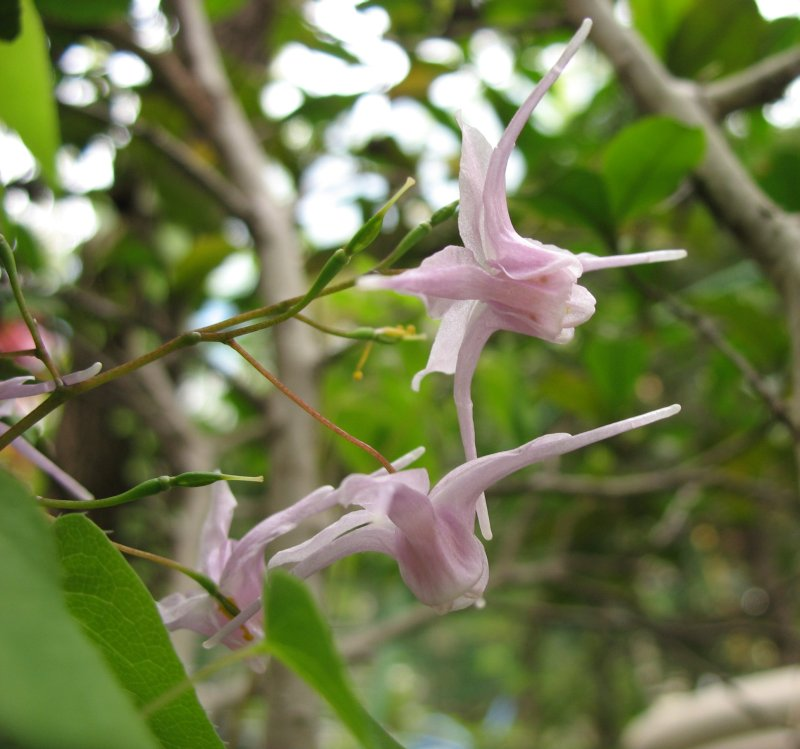

Scientific classification
- Kingdom: Plantae
- Clade: Tracheophytes
- Clade: Angiosperms
- Clade: Eudicots
- Order: Ranunculales
- Family: Berberidaceae
- Genus: Epimedium
- Species: E. grandiflorum

Binomial name
- Epimedium grandiflorum C.Morren

Synonyms
- Endoplectris tricolor Raf.; Epimedium grandiflorum f. flavescens Stearn; Epimedium grandiflorum f. heterochroum Y.Hayashi; Epimedium grandiflorum f. violaceum (C.Morren) Stearn; Epimedium grandiflorum var. higoense T.Shimizu; Epimedium macranthum C.Morren & Decne.; Epimedium pumilum Baker; Epimedium violaceum var. grandiflorum Siebold & de Vriese

= Epimedium grandiflorum =

Species of flowering plant

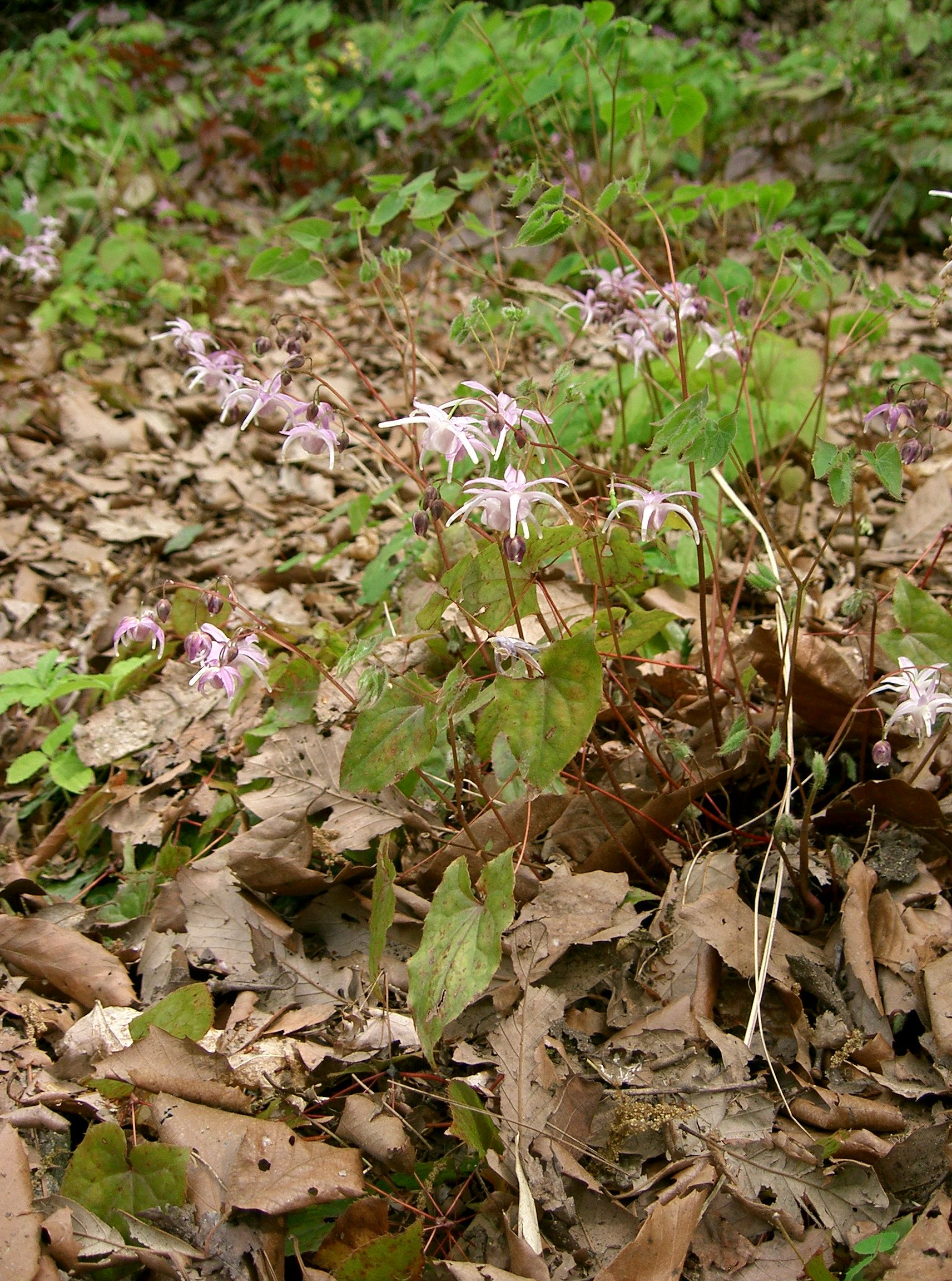

Epimedium grandiflorum, the large flowered barrenwort, or bishop's hat, is a species of flowering plant in the family Berberidaceae, native to Japan and Korea.

== Description ==
It is a deciduous perennial growing to 30 cm (12 in), with bright red stems with green heart-shaped leaves (copper-tinged when young) which are slightly hairy on the bottom. In spring it produces pink, white, yellow or purple long-spurred flowers. The Latin specific epithet grandiflorum means large-flowered.

== Cultivation ==
Numerous cultivars have been selected for garden use, of which the following have gained the Royal Horticultural Society's Award of Garden Merit:

- E. grandiflorum 'Akagi-Zakura'
- E. grandiflorum 'Circe'

== Use ==
It is commonly packed in a capsule with other ingredients or sold as herbal flakes or powder with the name "horny goat weed".
