= Spirotetronate cyclase AbyU =

Enzyme

L-Spirotetronate Cyclase AbyU
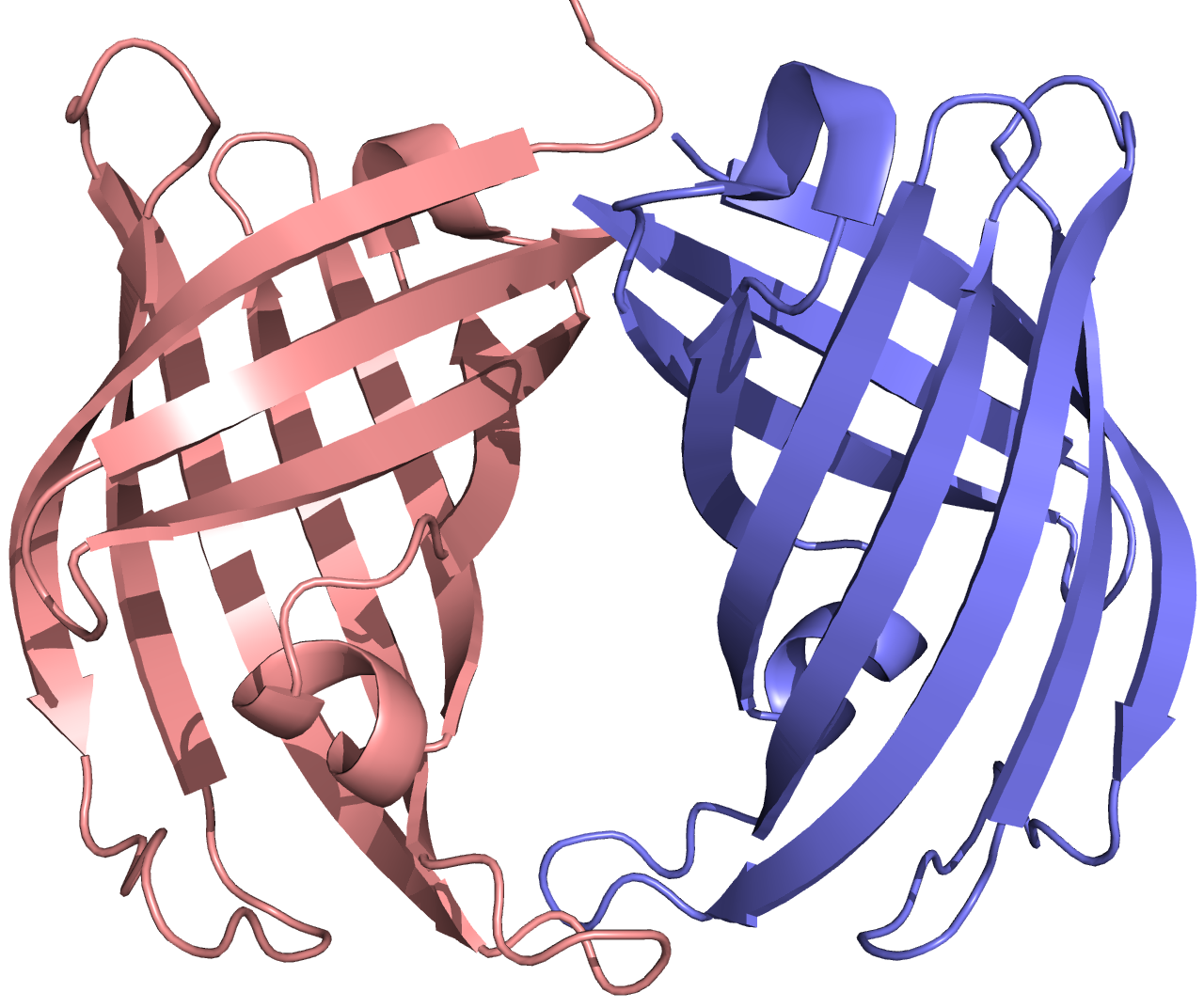
- Depiction of the spirotetronate cyclase AbyU dimer

Identifiers
- EC no.: 5.5.1.-

Databases
- IntEnz: IntEnz view
- BRENDA: BRENDA entry
- ExPASy: NiceZyme view
- KEGG: KEGG entry
- MetaCyc: metabolic pathway
- PRIAM: profile
- PDB structures: RCSB PDB PDBe PDBsum
Search
- PMC: articles
- PubMed: articles
- NCBI: proteins

YD repeat-containing protein

Identifiers
- Organism: Micromonospora maris
- Symbol: VAB18032_16470
- Entrez: 10451169
- PDB: 5DYQ
- UniProt: F4F7G1

Other data
- EC number: 5.5.1
Search for
- Structures: Swiss-model
- Domains: InterPro

Spirotetronate cyclase AbyU is an enzyme responsible for catalyzing the intramolecular Diels–Alder cycloaddition in the abyssomicin C biosynthetic pathway. A key step in the biosynthesis of this compound catalyzed by AbyU involves intramolecular [4+2] cycloaddition—also known as the Diels-Alder reaction—to form a heterobicyclic ring system precursor consisting of tetronic acid and a cyclohexene ring that are spiro-linked.

AbyU is a natural Diels-Alderase found in the marine actinomycete Verrucosispora maris. Abyssomicin C, synthesized with the help of AbyU, is a potent inhibitor of bacterial folate metabolism. It is effective against Mycobacterium tuberculosis and multidrug resistant clinical isolates of Staphylococcus aureus. Abyu is one of very few enzymes that are able to catalyze pericyclic reactions which effectively form regioselective and stereoselective carbon-carbon bonds.

== Structure ==
Diels-Alderase is a dimer of two identical, eight-stranded, antiparallel β-barrels. The base of the barrel is held together by the formation of a salt bridge between the side-chains of Glu19 and Arg122. Of equal significance is the presence of a flexible loop structure at the entrance of the enzyme, sandwiched between the beta sheets 1 and 2 of the barrel. The purpose of the loop is speculated to activate during substrate appropriation and act as a lid which the catalysis occurs. Within the barrel, it is mainly hydrophobic forces that interact with the substrate.

== Mechanism ==
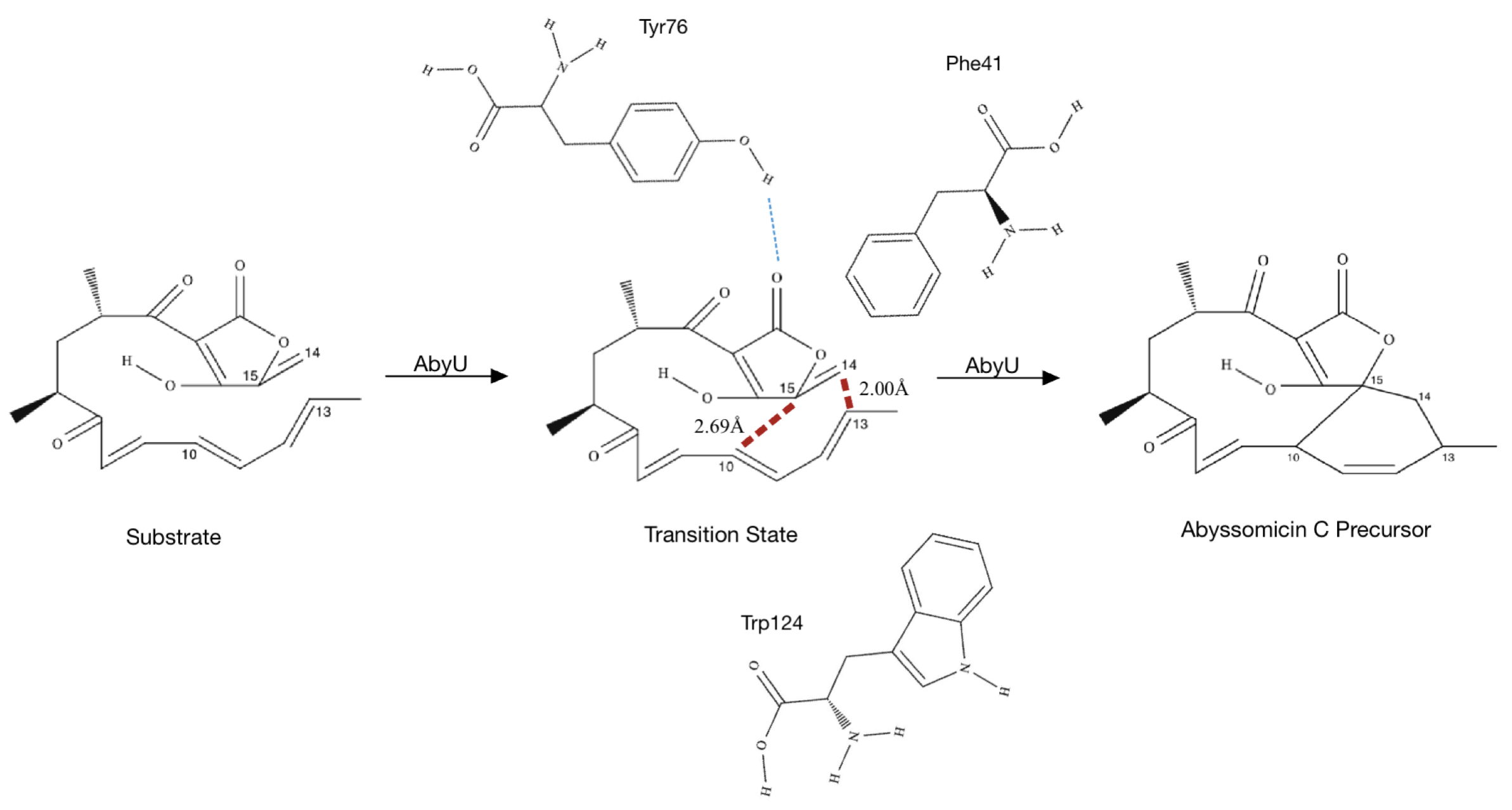
The mechanism of spirotetronate cyclase AbyU. The transition state shows the substrate in the active site during which the coordination of Trp124 and Phe41 which provide hydrophobic bonding forces whilst Tyr76 provides hydrogen bonding forces.

Diels-Alderase Abyu catalyzes the reaction that results in the formation of the precursor molecule to Abyssomicin C. It does this via a concerted, asynchronous Diels-Alder mechanism as indicated by Quantum mechanics/molecular mechanics (QM/MM) MD simulations. Higher-level density functional theory calculations support the conclusions made by the MD simulations, showing the transition state for the product of the enzyme which indicates the bond length between C13-C14 and C10-C15 to be 2.00Å and 2.69Å, respectively. Gas state DFT calculations also show that the transition state of the molecule prefers to form the Diels Alder endo product. Structurally, the diene and dienophile of the substrate are found to be near Trp124 and Phe41, respectively; Tyr76 participates in hydrogen bonding with the lactone carbonyl which is predicted to aid in substrate specificity.

== Function ==
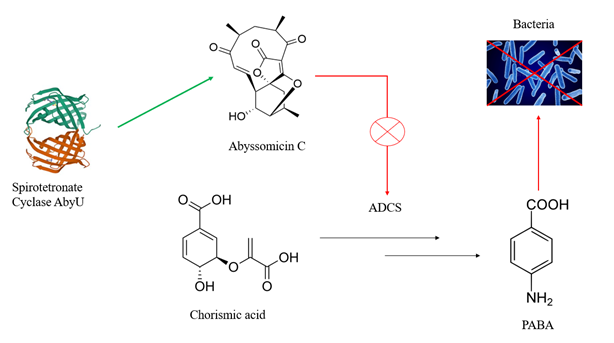
Negative feedback regulation of pABA pathway in bacteria with Abyssomicin C .

As mentioned above, AbyU is a key enzyme in the production of Abyssomicin C, which was found to be the first structure-based inhibitor of aminodeoxychorismate synthase (ADCS). ADCS is crucial for the conversion of chorismic acid to p-aminobenzoic acid (pABA). PABA is known to be essential for bacterial survival. Thus, Abyssomicin C represents an attractive target for antibacterial drug design.

There are more Abyssomicin C derivatives that can be synthesized using AbyU. For example, AbyU can convert the native substrate of another Diels-Alderase, AbmU, to form Abyssomicin 7 which also has antibacterial properties. This shows the capability of AbyU to catalyze the production of different antibacterials.

== Evolution ==
Evidence suggests that enzymes such as AbyU that catalyze pericyclic reactions have similar evolutionary origins. Many of them have anti-parallel β-barrel topology; they all have 2 allene oxide cyclase (AOC) like domain (PF18678), which has featured 8-stranded anti-parallel β-barrels as well as many other common domains. Their topology is also very similar with all of them having β-barrel core fold. However, any significant conservation of the active site architecture isn't observed. Other conserved residues might be variable for different substrates.

== Industrial applications ==
Due to the hydrophobicity of the substrate and product of AbyU, organic solvents are required to aid in dissolution and to prevent aggregation. Modification of AbyU could remove this issue, improving its efficiency in industrial settings. Several modification pathways have been proposed including protein bioconjugation and PEGylation. Protein bioconjugation synergizes the properties of the two conjugated proteins. PEGylation attaches polyethylene glycol to proteins which can improve water solubility and thermal stability. Though, the increase in thermal stability may not be necessary; AbyU does not denature rapidly and does not lose catalytic properties until after 60 °C. The structural integrity of AbyU is further demonstrated by its ability to remain folded in chemical denaturants such as guanidinium chloride.
