= Pentabromopseudilin =

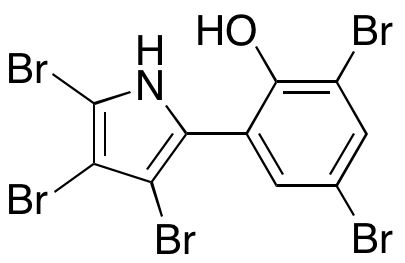

Names
- Preferred IUPAC name 2,4-Dibromo-6-(3,4,5-tribromo-1H-pyrrol-2-yl)phenol

Identifiers
CAS Number	10245-81-5
3D model (JSmol)	Interactive image
ChEBI	CHEBI:70619
ChEMBL	ChEMBL1235156
ChemSpider	287043
PubChem CID	324093
UNII	BUV7D4FJ9V
CompTox Dashboard (EPA)	DTXSID90314744
- InChI: InChI=1S/C10H4Br5NO/c11-3-1-4(9(17)5(12)2-3)8-6(13)7(14)10(15)16-8/h1-2,16-17H Key: LXMNWKJHYOZUQL-UHFFFAOYSA-N
- SMILES: C1=C(C=C(C(=C1Br)O)C2=C(C(=C(N2)Br)Br)Br)Br

Properties
Chemical formula	C_{10}H_{4}Br_{5}NO
Molar mass	553.668 g·mol^{−1}
- Except where otherwise noted, data are given for materials in their standard state (at 25 °C [77 °F], 100 kPa). Infobox references

Pentabromopseudilin, the first reported marine microbial antibiotic, is a bioactive natural product that contains a highly halogenated 2-arrylpyrrole moiety. Pentabromopseudilin (PBP) is a unique hybrid bromophenol-bromopyrrole compound that is made up of over 70% bromine atoms, contributing to its potent bioactivity. PBP was first isolated from Pseudomonas bromoutilis, and has since been found to be produced by other marine microbes, including Alteromonas luteoviolaceus, Chromobacteria, and Pseudoalteromonas spp.

== History ==
PBP was first isolated and reported in 1966, when Burkholder and colleagues identified an unusual, highly brominated pyrrole antibiotic that was produced from Thalassia-associated marine bacteria collected from tropical waters off La Parguera, Puerto Rico. Early investigations from this first report pointed at intrigue in regards to the pyrrole's particularly potent activity against gram positive bacteria, namely the strains Staphylococcus aureus, Diplococcus pneumoniae and Streptococcus pyogenes. However, despite inhibition these strains at PBP drug concentrations of 0.0063 μg/ml, these promising preliminary findings failed to yield the same success in in vivo mouse therapeutic studies.

== Biological activity ==
Of more than 20 classified pyrrole antibiotics, PBP is the most active member in its class, and demonstrates a high in vitro activity (IC_{50} = 0.1 μM) against methicillin-resistant Staphylococcus aureus (MRSA). As such, it has a served as a model example of the potential significance of marine natural products drug discovery as an effective resource in the face of "superbug" antibiotic resistance. Other than being a potent antibiotic, PBP also demonstrates a wide variety of in vitro biological functions including antitumor activity, antifungal activity, myosin inhibition, human lipoxygenase inhibition, and phytotoxicity.

== Biosynthesis ==
The biosynthesis of PBP was first shown through isotope feeding studies, and then biochemically when genomic data of PBP-producing strains became readily available.

=== Early isotope feeding studies ===
The first investigations seeking to understand PBP biosynthesis was targeted by identifying PBP building blocks by feeding isotopically-labeled putative precursors of the phenol and pyrrole rings to PBP-producing bacteria. Identification of isotope labels being incorporated in the natural product would shed light on biosynthetic steps preceding the formation of PBP.

In 1994, a feeding experiment study conducted on Alteromonas luteoviolaceus demonstrated that the phenol ring of PBP is derived from the shikimate pathway. In this work, general precursors that were labeled with ^{13}C were fed to A. luteoviolaceus cultures after inoculation. It was found that the incorporation of a variety of glucose labels ([2-^{13}C]-, [1,2-^{13}C_{2}]-, and [3-^{13}C]), indicated that the PBP benzene ring is derived from carbohydrate metabolism and have occurred through erythrose 4-phosphate. From these results indicating a shikimic acid derivation, it was further deduced that p-hydroxybenzoic acid (4-HBA) be a plausible precursor for PBP's phenol group. This was indeed proven when isotopically labeled 4-HBA was observed to be incorporated into the phenol ring of PBP at >80%. Despite this groundbreaking study, no ^{13}C incorporation was observed in the pyrrole ring of PBP.

In 2004, a follow-up study described the PBP pyrrole ring as derived from L-proline. This work involved an isotope-feeding study involving 21 different Alteromonas luteoviolaceus culture medias that were introduced with labeled [5-^{13}C]proline in addition to tyrosine, histidine, ornithine, glycine, potassium bromide (KBr), and PBP. From this feeding experiment, it was determined that the overall enrichment of PBP had increased by 60%- indicating that proline had directly converted into the pyrrole ring.

=== Genetic basis for pentabromopseudilin biosynthesis ===
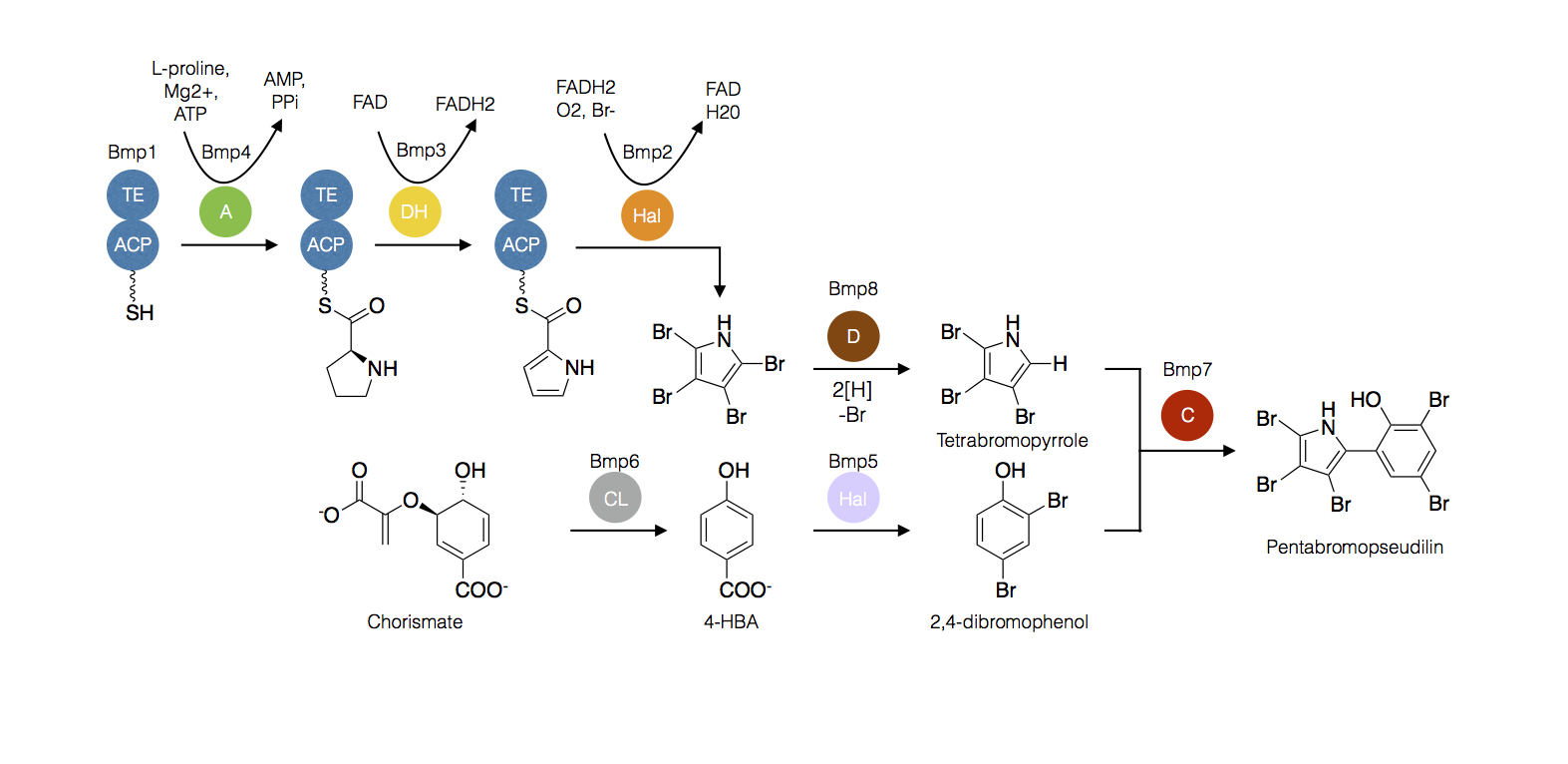
Bmp pathway for brominated marine pyrroles and phenols, for pentabromopseudilin

The biosynthesis of pentabromopseudilin, among other halopyrroles, has been elucidated via the identification of the conserved brominated marine pyrroles/phenols (bmp) pathway first identified in the marine bacteria, P. luteoviolacea 2ta16 and P. phenolica O-BC30. The bmp pathway describes a bi-modular scheme for polybrominated marine microbial natural products production. In the first module, the bromophenol moiety of PBP is first assembled from a chorismate precursor which is then converted by Bmp6, a chorismate lyase (CL), to yield 4-HBA. 4-HBA is then di-halogenated by the flavin-dependent halogenase, Bmp5 (Hal), to yield 2,3-dibromophenol.

Consistent with earlier isotopic studies, the PBP halopyrrole biosynthesis via the bmp pathway begins with L-proline. In this module, L-proline is acylated to the acyl carrier protein domain of Bmp1 (ACP-thioesterase (TE) di-domain protein) by the proline adenyl transferase Bmp4 (A). The flavin-dependent dehydrogenase, Bmp3 (DH), then oxidizes the prolyl ring to a pyrrole. The loaded protein is then tri-brominated with the flavin-dependent halogenase, Bmp2 (Hal), becoming 2,3,4,5-tetrabromopyrrole. Next, Bmp8 (D), a unique thioredoxin-like dehalogenase, removes the C-2 bromine of tetrabromopyrrole, which then allows for coupling to the previously described 2,4-dibromophenol via the cytochrome P450 enzyme, Bmp7 (C).
