= Aminodeoxychorismate synthase =

4-amino-4-deoxychorismate synthase
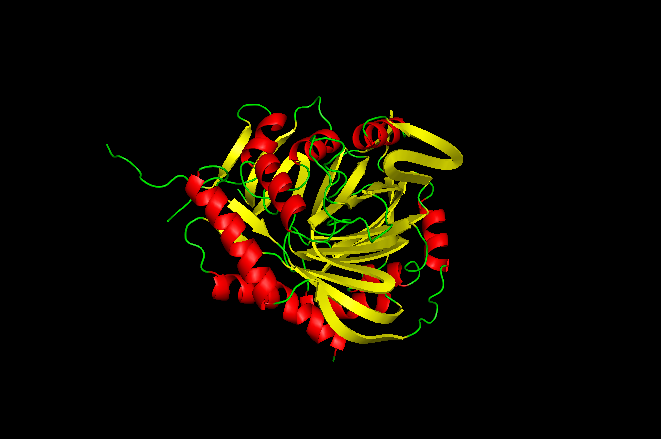
- Aminodeoxychorismate synthase

Identifiers
- EC no.: 2.6.1.85
- CAS no.: 132264-37-0

Databases
- IntEnz: IntEnz view
- BRENDA: BRENDA entry
- ExPASy: NiceZyme view
- KEGG: KEGG entry
- MetaCyc: metabolic pathway
- PRIAM: profile
- PDB structures: RCSB PDB PDBe PDBsum
- Gene Ontology: AmiGO / QuickGO
Search
- PMC: articles
- PubMed: articles
- NCBI: proteins

In enzymology, an aminodeoxychorismate synthase (EC 2.6.1.85) is an enzyme that catalyzes the chemical reaction

chorismate + L-glutamine $\rightleftharpoons$ 4-amino-4-deoxychorismate + L-glutamate

Thus, the two substrates of this enzyme are chorismate and L-glutamine, whereas its two products are 4-amino-4-deoxychorismate and L-glutamate.

It is part of a pathway for the biosynthesis of para-aminobenzoic acid (PABA); a precursor for the production of folates. Folates are family of cofactors that are essential for living organisms. Folate cofactors are used in several one-carbon transfer reactions required during the synthesis of essential metabolites, including methionine and thymidylate.

Aminodeoxychorismate synthase (PabB), a 51 kDa protein in E. coli, is encoded by the gene pabB. 4-amino-4-deoxychorismate, the product of PabB, can be converted to para-aminobenzoic acid by the enzyme 4-amino-4-deoxychorismate lyase (PabC).

== Nonmenclature ==
This enzyme belongs to the class of transferases. This means that aminodeoxychorismate synthase catalyzes the transfer of one functional group from a molecule to another. Specifically, aminodeoxychorismate synthase is a transaminase that transfers an amino group to a keto acid. The systematic name is Chorismate:L-glutamine aminotransferase. Formerly aminodeoxychorismate synthase was referred to as PABA synthase; however this name is no longer recommended as it is understood that the formation of PABA requires the action of a further enzyme (4-amino-4-deoxychorismate lyase).

Common names that the enzyme goes by are:

- Aminodeoxychorismate synthase
- ADC synthase
- 4-amino-4-deoxychorismate synthase
- PabB

== Reaction ==
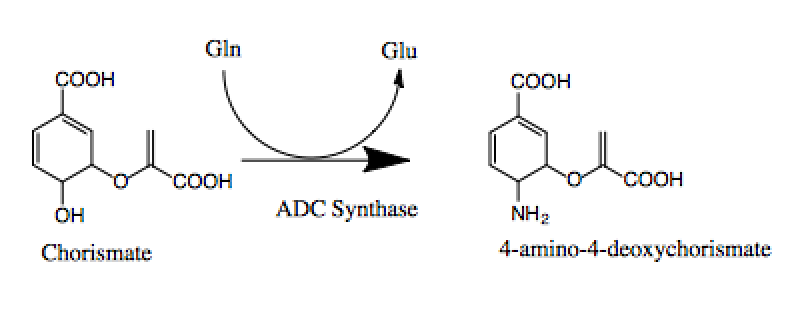

In certain microbial species such as Escherichia coli, aminodeoxychorismate synthase is a heterodimeric complex composed of two proteins, glutamine amidotransferase (PabA) and 4-amino-4-deoxychorismate synthase (PabB). In other species such as plants or lower eukaryotes an enzyme comprising a single polypeptide performs both reactions.

In Escherichia coli, the reaction is a two step process. Glutamine amidotransferase (PabA) and 4-amino-4-deoxychorismate synthase (PabB) form a heterodimeric complex that catalyzes the synthesis of 4-amino-4-deoxychorismate. The first step occurs with PabA abstracting ammonia from glutamine. The second step occurs when PabB reacts both substrates (chorismate and ammonia) to synthesize 4-amino-4-deoxychorismate.

In plants such as Arabidopsis thaliana, aminodeoxychorismate synthase is a monomeric enzyme that carries out both steps of the reaction.

== Structure ==
Aminodeoxychorismate synthase (PabB) is either a heterodimeric or monomeric enzyme depending on what organism it is from. The enzyme has 452-residues and consists of both alpha and beta folds that is very similar to some types of anthranilate synthase. The core of PabB consists of two domains that form a beta sandwich. Also, it has helices and loops around the outside of its core. The chorismate binding site on PabB consists of amino acids residues that make up beta sheet core and the two key alpha helices.

Certain aminodeoxychorismate synthase enzymes contain an additional binding site for tryptophan, thought to be a non-functional vestigial binding site. It is believed that aminodeoxychorismate synthase may have evolved from anthranilate synthase (TrpE) - an enzyme that catalyses the production of an intermediate on the path to tryptophan.

== Homologues ==
Enzymes with similar structures to aminodeoxychorismate synthase are:

- Anthranilate synthase (TrpE)
- Isochorismate synthase (MenF)
- Salicylate synthase

A common feature among this list of enzymes is that they all utilize chorismate as a substrate.

== Anti-folate drug target ==
Aminodeoxychorismate synthase is targeted by the antibiotics atrop-abyssomycin C and 6-fluoroshikimic acid. By inhibiting the production of an intermediate on the pathway to PABA, folate levels are depleted. Without sufficient folate, DNA and protein synthesis are severely impaired.
