= Streptomyces abyssomicinicus =

Scientific classification
- Domain: Bacteria
- Kingdom: Bacillati
- Phylum: Actinomycetota
- Class: Actinomycetes
- Order: Streptomycetales
- Family: Streptomycetaceae
- Genus: Streptomyces
- Species: S. abyssomicinicus

Binomial name
- Streptomyces abyssomicinicus Komaki et al. 2020

Type strain
- CHI39

Species of bacterium

Streptomyces abyssomicinicus is a bacterium species from the genus of Streptomyces which has been isolated from rock soil. Streptomyces abyssomicinicus produces abyssomicin.

== See also ==
- List of Streptomyces species
