= 4-Aminobenzoic acid =

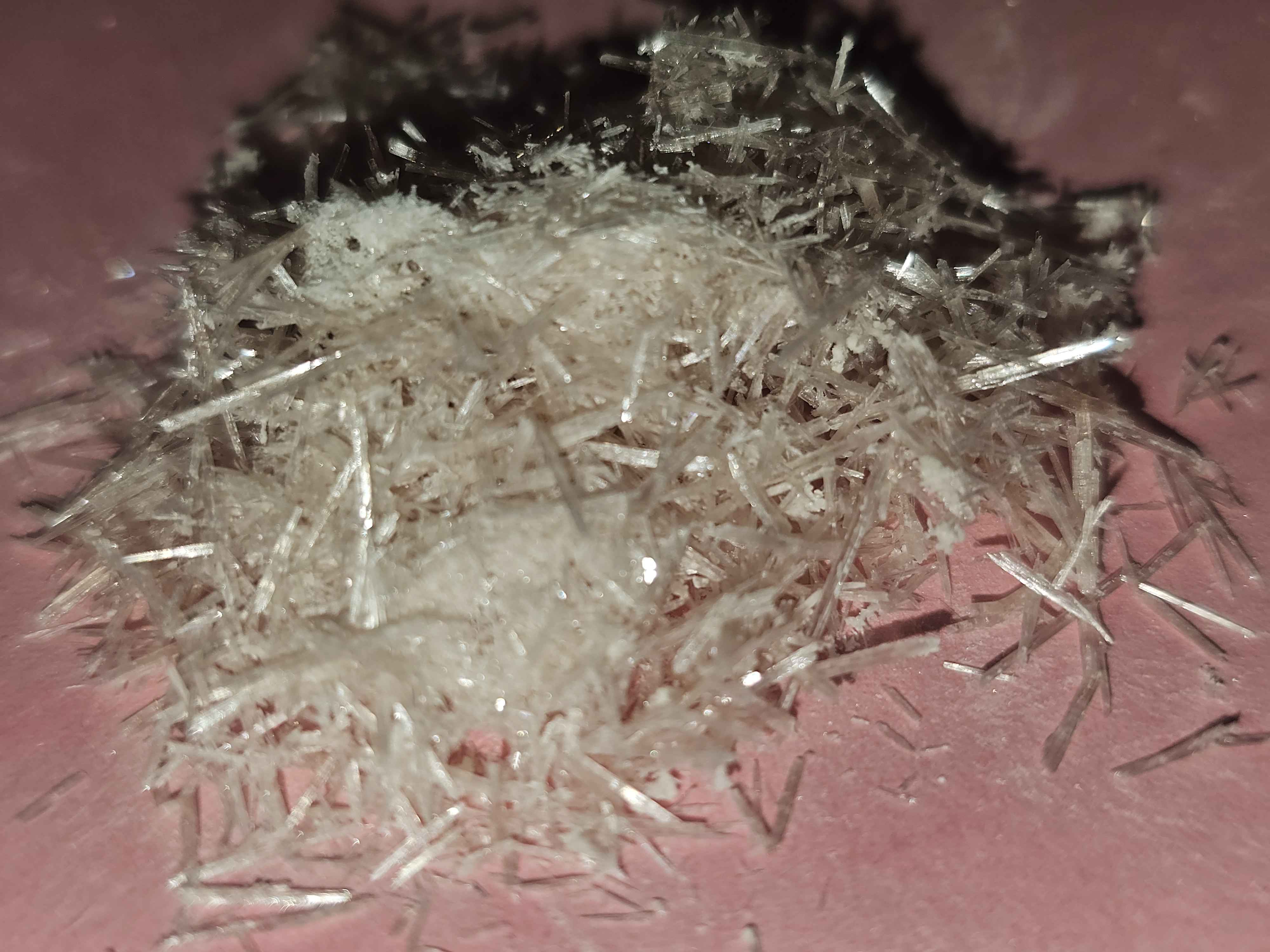

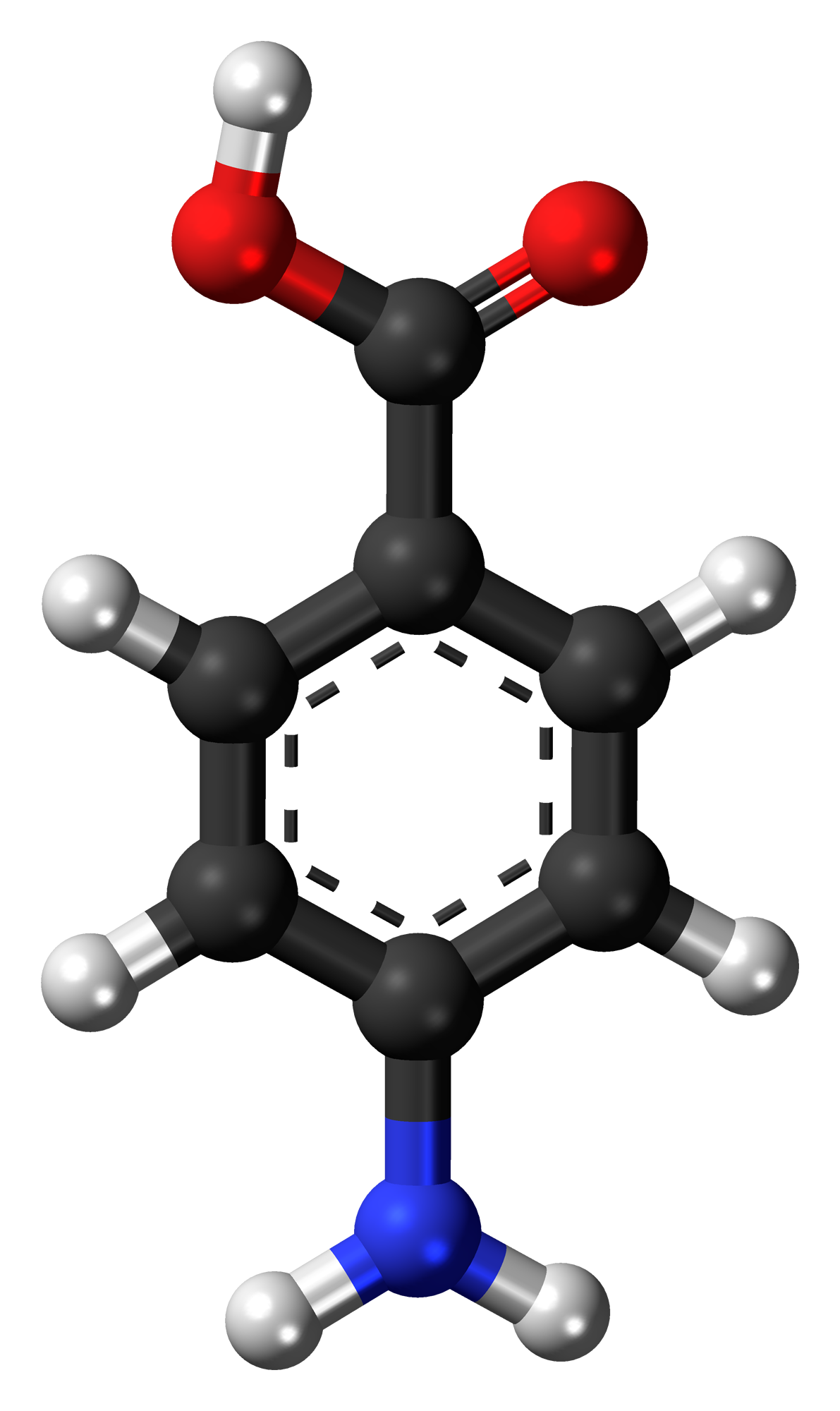
C=black, H=white, O=red, N=blue

Names
- Preferred IUPAC name 4-Aminobenzoic acid
- Other names para-Aminobenzoic acid p-Aminobenzoic acid PABA; Vitamin B_{10} Vitamin B_{x} Bacterial vitamin H^{1}

Identifiers
CAS Number	150-13-0
3D model (JSmol)	Interactive image
ChEBI	CHEBI:30753
ChEMBL	ChEMBL542
ChemSpider	953
DrugBank	DB02362
ECHA InfoCard	100.005.231
KEGG	D02456
PubChem CID	978
UNII	TL2TJE8QTX
CompTox Dashboard (EPA)	DTXSID6024466
- InChI: InChI=1S/C7H7NO2/c8-6-3-1-5(2-4-6)7(9)10/h1-4H,8H2,(H,9,10) Key: ALYNCZNDIQEVRV-UHFFFAOYSA-N; InChI=1/C7H7NO2/c8-6-3-1-5(2-4-6)7(9)10/h1-4H,8H2,(H,9,10) Key: ALYNCZNDIQEVRV-UHFFFAOYAH
- SMILES: O=C(O)c1ccc(N)cc1

Properties
Chemical formula	C_{7}H_{7}NO_{2}
Molar mass	137.138 g·mol^{−1}
Appearance	White-grey crystals
Density	1.374 g/mL
Melting point	187 to 189 °C (369 to 372 °F; 460 to 462 K)
Boiling point	340 °C (644 °F; 613 K)
Solubility in water	1 g/170 mL (25 °C); 1 g/90 mL (90 °C)
Acidity (pK_{a})	2.42 (amino; H_{2}O); 4.88 (carboxyl; H_{2}O)

Hazards
- Occupational safety and health (OHS/OSH)
Main hazards	eye irritant, some persons may be allergic to this compound
- Except where otherwise noted, data are given for materials in their standard state (at 25 °C [77 °F], 100 kPa). verify (what is ?) Infobox references

4-Aminobenzoic acid (also known as para-aminobenzoic acid or PABA because the two functional groups are attached to the benzene ring across from one another in the para position) is an organic compound with the formula H_{2}NC_{6}H_{4}CO_{2}H. PABA is a white crystalline solid, although commercial samples can appear gray. It is slightly soluble in water. It consists of a benzene ring substituted with amino and carboxyl groups. The compound occurs extensively in the natural world.

== Production and occurrence ==
In industry, PABA is prepared mainly by two routes:

- Reduction of 4-nitrobenzoic acid
- Hoffman degradation of the monoamide derived from terephthalic acid.

Food sources of PABA include liver, brewer's yeast (and unfiltered beer), kidney, molasses, mushrooms, and whole grains. Other food sources of PABA include spinach and oat seeds.

== Biology ==
=== Biochemistry ===
PABA synthesis pathway in bacteria

Tetrahydrofolate synthesis pathway

PABA is an intermediate in the synthesis of folate by bacteria, plants, and fungi.

Many bacteria, including those found in the human intestinal tract such as E. coli, generate PABA from chorismate by the combined action of the enzymes 4-amino-4-deoxychorismate synthase and 4-amino-4-deoxychorismate lyase. Plants produce PABA in their chloroplasts, and store it as a glucose ester (pABA-Glc) in their tissues. The malarial protozoan Plasmodium only make PABA when necessary, preferring to get it from the surroundings if able to.

Some bacteria, including a few found in the human microbiome, are unable to make PABA for themselves but can use PABA to make folate. A few are very efficient at the PABA-to-folate conversion despite not making their own PABA.

Sulfonamide drugs are structurally similar to PABA, and their antibacterial activity is due to their ability to interfere with the conversion of PABA to folate by the enzyme dihydropteroate synthetase. Thus, bacterial growth is limited through folate deficiency.

==== In animals ====
PABA has been referred to historically as "vitamin B_{x}", but plays no direct role in animal cells and is hence no longer recognized as a vitamin. Animals (including humans) are unable to use PABA in any way and so require folate from dietary sources such as green leafy vegetables.

PABA can play a role in the supply of folate to an animal via its microbiome; this is best demonstrated in the worm C. elegans, in which addition of PABA could increase folate production by resident E. coli and correct for deficiencies. The C. elegans folate transporter only works with the reduced form (tetrahydrofolate, THF and derivatives such as folinic acid), not regular folic acid. Any folic acid from the environment is only usable following spontaneous breakdown to PABA-glu, which E. coli uses to make THF. In contrast, humans can directly use oxidized folates thanks to the proton-coupled folate transporter and have no need for this detour; this "recycling" of PABA-glu would, at best, compensate for folate degradation.

The above do not seem to apply in normal mammals, however. Despite detection of gut-produced folate being incorporated into mammals, ex vivo folate synthesis capacity of fecal bacteria have no correlation with the folate status of their donors. Furthermore, comparison with germ-free animals show that under a chow diet, the mouse microbiome is a net consumer of folate. The caveat is that the mouse chow is more folate-rich than typical human diets and may be encouraging a shift towards a folate-consuming microbiome. There are no reports of any usefulness of PABA in germ-free animals.

=== Medical use ===
PABA and its salts are used in nutritional epidemiological studies to assess the completeness of 24-hour urine collection for the determination of urinary sodium, potassium, or nitrogen levels.

The potassium salt (potassium paraaminobenzoate, "aminobenzoate potassium") is used as a drug against fibrotic skin disorders, such as Peyronie's disease, under the brand name Potaba. There is a lack of strong evidence. It is believed to work by inhibiting fibroblast glycosaminoglycan secretion and stabilizing monoamine oxidase A activity. PABA is also occasionally used in pill form by sufferers of irritable bowel syndrome to treat its associated gastrointestinal symptoms.

PABA derivatives have also been proposed to function as acetylcholinesterase inhibitors in diseases that cause deficient cholinergic systems, such as Alzheimer's disease.

=== Nutritional supplement ===
Despite the lack of any recognized syndromes of PABA deficiency in humans, except for those who lack the colonic bacteria that generate PABA, many claims of benefit are made by commercial suppliers of PABA as a nutritional supplement. The benefit is claimed for fatigue, irritability, depression, weeping eczema (moist eczema), scleroderma (premature hardening of the skin), patchy pigment loss in the skin (vitiligo), and premature grey hair.

== Commercial and industrial use ==
PABA finds use in the biomedical sector. Its derivatives are found as a structural component in 1.5% of a database of 12111 commercial drugs. Other uses include its conversion to specialty azo dyes and crosslinking agents. PABA is also used as a biodegradable pesticide, though its use is now limited due to evolution of new variants of bio-pesticides. Specifically, studies have shown that PABA photodegrades through an O2-mediated pathway in which PABA is oxidized by O2 via hydrogen abstraction and decarboxylation.

In the past, PABA was widely used in sunscreens as a UV filter. It is a UVB absorber, meaning it can absorb wavelengths between 290 and 320 nm. while still allowing UVA wavelengths between 320-400 nm to pass through, producing a tan. The chemical structure of PABA, with the amino and carboxyl groups being para to each other, allows for easy electron delocalization, which reduces the gap between the highest occupied molecular orbital (HOMO) and lowest unoccupied molecular orbital (LUMO). This makes it easier for the electrons in PABA to transition to a higher energy state upon absorbing light. Patented in 1943, PABA was one of the first active ingredients to be used in sunscreen. The first in vivo studies on mice showed that PABA reduced UV damage. In addition, it was shown to protect against skin tumors in rodents, as shown by a 1975 study ran by Dr. Diane Sekura Snyder and Dr. Marian May. However, animal and in vitro studies in the early 1980s suggested PABA might increase the risk of cellular UV damage. On the basis of these studies, as well as problems with allergies and clothing discoloration, PABA fell out of favor as a sunscreen. In 2008 it was banned as a sunscreen ingredient in the European Union and in 2019 the FDA proposed its limited use. However, water-insoluble PABA derivatives such as padimate O are currently used in some cosmetic products including mascara, concealer, and matte lipsticks.

As of 2008, the advancement of new sunscreen is focused on developing a broad spectrum of active ingredients that provide consistent protection across all wavelengths, including UVA. Researchers are considering the PABA–TiO_{2} Hybrid Nanostructures that result from the method of aqueous in situ synthesis with PABA and TiO_{2}.

== Safety considerations ==
PABA is largely nontoxic; the median lethal dose of PABA in dogs (oral) is 2 g/kg. Allergic reactions, specifically allergic contact dermatitis and photocontact dermatitis, to PABA can occur. It is formed in the metabolism of certain ester-type local anesthetics, and many allergic reactions to local anesthetics are the result of reactions to PABA.

== Applications ==
PABA is used in the synthesis of the following drugs:

1. Local anesthetics: Amoxecaine, butamben, butethamine, calocaine, farmocaine, isobutamben, leucinocaine, risocaine, tetracaine, topicaine, tutocaine.
2. Benzocaine is used to make Aminostimil, bentiromide, Cetaben, Declopramide, Leteprinim, Procaine, Procainamide, Sematilide, Thihexinol, Votracon
3. Miscellaneous: Acedoben, aminohippuric acid, benaxibine, CAM [40449-96-5], CJM-126 [6278-73-5], CPI-1189 [183619-38-7], dinalin [58338-59-3], JW-55 [664993-53-7], K-AM [78307-27-4], LY-188544 [97042-55-2], nufenoxole, pabofen (see under Phenatine) pafencil, S-1688 [30194-63-9], tacedinaline, votracon & xenazoic acid. & Tafamidis
