= 2-Succinyl-5-enolpyruvyl-6-hydroxy-3-cyclohexene-1-carboxylic-acid synthase =

Enzyme

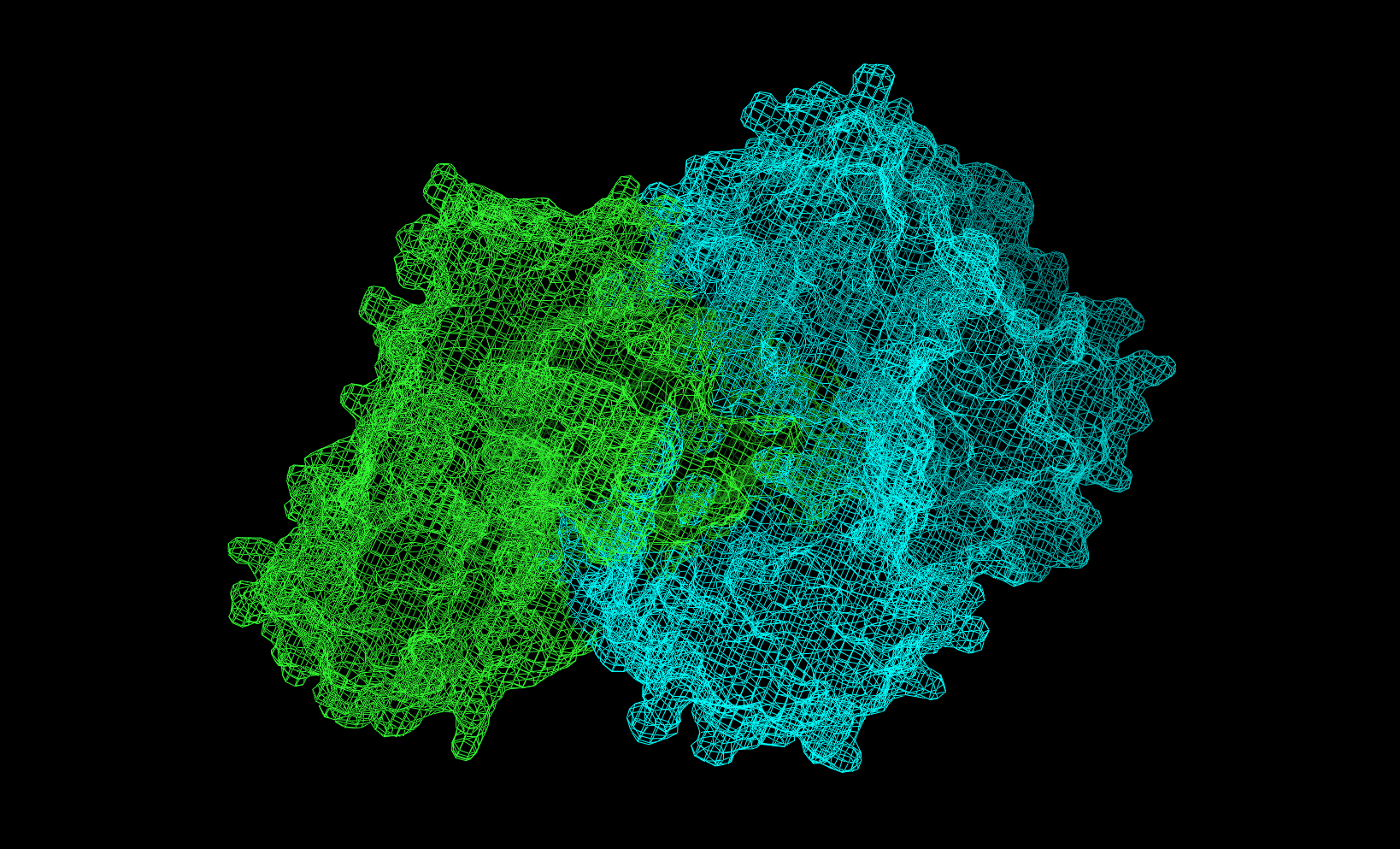
- This image shows the two chains that come together to make up this enzyme

Identifiers
- EC no.: 2.2.1.9
- CAS no.: 122007-88-9

Databases
- IntEnz: IntEnz view
- BRENDA: BRENDA entry
- ExPASy: NiceZyme view
- KEGG: KEGG entry
- MetaCyc: metabolic pathway
- PRIAM: profile
- PDB structures: RCSB PDB PDBe PDBsum
Search
- PMC: articles
- PubMed: articles
- NCBI: proteins

SEPHCHC synthase (EC EC 2.2.1.9), encoded by menD gene in E. coli, is an enzyme that catalyzes the second step of menaquinone (vitamin K2) biosynthesis. The two substrates of this enzyme are 2-oxoglutarate and isochorismate. The products of this enzyme are 2-succinyl-5-enolpyruvyl-6-hydroxy-3-cyclohexene-1-carboxylic acid and carbon dioxide. It belongs to the transferase family.

== Classification ==
This enzyme belongs to a family of enzymes that transfer aldehyde or ketonic groups. To be specific, this enzyme belongs to the transketolase and transaldolase families. Common names for the enzyme are:

- MenD
- SEPHCHC synthase
- 2-succinyl-5-enolpyruvyl-6-hydroxy-3-cyclohexene-1-carboxylic-acid synthase
- Systematic name: isochorismate:2-oxoglutarate 4-oxopentanoatetransferase

== Reaction ==
In the biosynthesis of vitamin K, SEPHCHC is involved in the second step of the pathway.

α-Ketoglutaric acid
+
Isochorismic acid
CO_{2}
2-Succinyl-5-enolpyruvyl-6-hydroxy-3-cyclohexene-1-carboxylic acid

The reaction is a decarboxylation, and to have maximum activity the enzyme uses the cofactor Mg^{2+}, a magnesium ion. It was originally thought that the reaction led to 2-succinyl-6-hydroxy-2,4-cyclohexadiene-1-carboxylate (SHCHC) directly, but this is the product of MenH. However, the product of this enzyme can lose a pyruvate spontaneously in base.

SEPHCHC product
SHCHC product
+
pyruvic acid

== Structure ==
The structures reveal a stable dimer-of-dimers association in agreement with gel filtration and analytical studies confirm the classification of MenD in the pyruvate oxidase family. The active site is highly basic with a hydrophobic patch. These features match with the chemical properties of the substrates.

== Homologues ==
There are many similar structures to MenD. Though it is commonly found in E. Coli, but can be found in other organisms as well. Bacillus subtilis and Mycobacterium tuberculosis are two homologues. All of the organisms share something in common, being that catalyze decarboxylation reactions.
