= Isochorismate synthase =

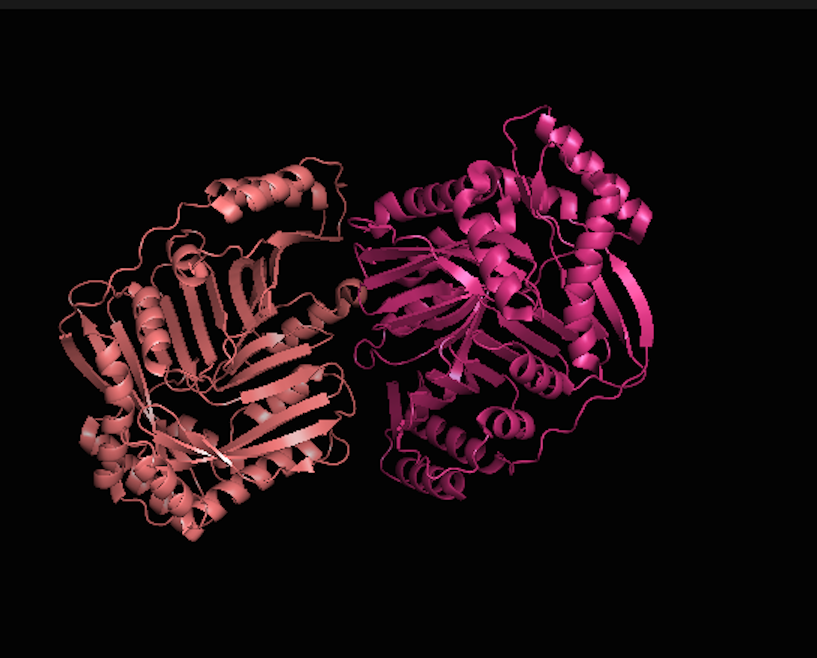
- Ishochorismate Synthase cartoon view (2 subunits)

Identifiers
- EC no.: 5.4.4.2
- CAS no.: 37318-53-9

Databases
- IntEnz: IntEnz view
- BRENDA: BRENDA entry
- ExPASy: NiceZyme view
- KEGG: KEGG entry
- MetaCyc: metabolic pathway
- PRIAM: profile
- PDB structures: RCSB PDB PDBe PDBsum
Search
- PMC: articles
- PubMed: articles
- NCBI: proteins

Isochorismate synthase ( EC 5.4.4.2) is an isomerase enzyme that catalyzes the first step in the biosynthesis of vitamin K_{2} (menaquinone) in Escherichia coli.

== Reaction ==
Isochorismate synthase, belongs to the isomerase enzyme family. More specifically it is classified as an intramolecular transferase because it transfers the hydroxy group of chorismate between carbons.

Isochorismate synthase catalyzes the irreversible conversion of chorismate to isochorismate:

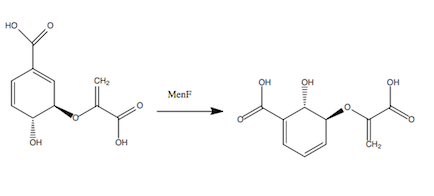

Isochorismate synthase is most active at 37 °C and at a pH between 7.5 and 8. It requires Mg^{2+} as a cofactor, in a concentration between 100 μM and 1 mM. Inhibitors of isochorismate synthase include:

- (4R,5R)-4-hydroxy-5-(1-carboxyvinyloxy)-cyclohex-1-ene carboxylate
- (4R,5R)-4-hydroxy-5-carboxymethoxy-cyclohex-1-enecarboxylate
- (4R,5R)-5-(2-carboxy-allyloxy)-4-hydroxy-cyclohex-1-enecarboxylate
- (4R,5R,6S)-6-ammonio-5-[(1-carboxylatoethenyl)oxy]-4-hydroxycyclohex-1-ene-1-carboxylate
- (4R,5R,7R)-5-(1-carboxy-ethoxy)-4-hydroxy-cyclohex-1-enecarboxylate
- (4R,5R,7S)-5-(1-carboxy-ethoxy)-4-hydroxy-cyclohex-1-enecarboxylate
- (4R,5S,6S)-4-ammonio-5-[(1-carboxylatoethenyl)oxy]-6-hydroxycyclohex-1-ene-1-carboxylate
- (4R,5S,6S)-5-[(1-carboxylatoethenyl)oxy]-4,6-dihydroxycyclohex-1-ene-1-carboxylate
- Cu^{2+}
- Hg^{2+}
- K^{+}
- Mg^{2+} at concentrations above 1 mM
- N-ethylmaleimide

== Nomenclature ==
The systematic name of this enzyme is isochorismate hydroxymutase, and the common name is isochorismate synthase. Other names for this enzyme include:

- Isochorismate mutase
- Menaquinone-specific isochorismate synthase
- MenF

== Pathways ==
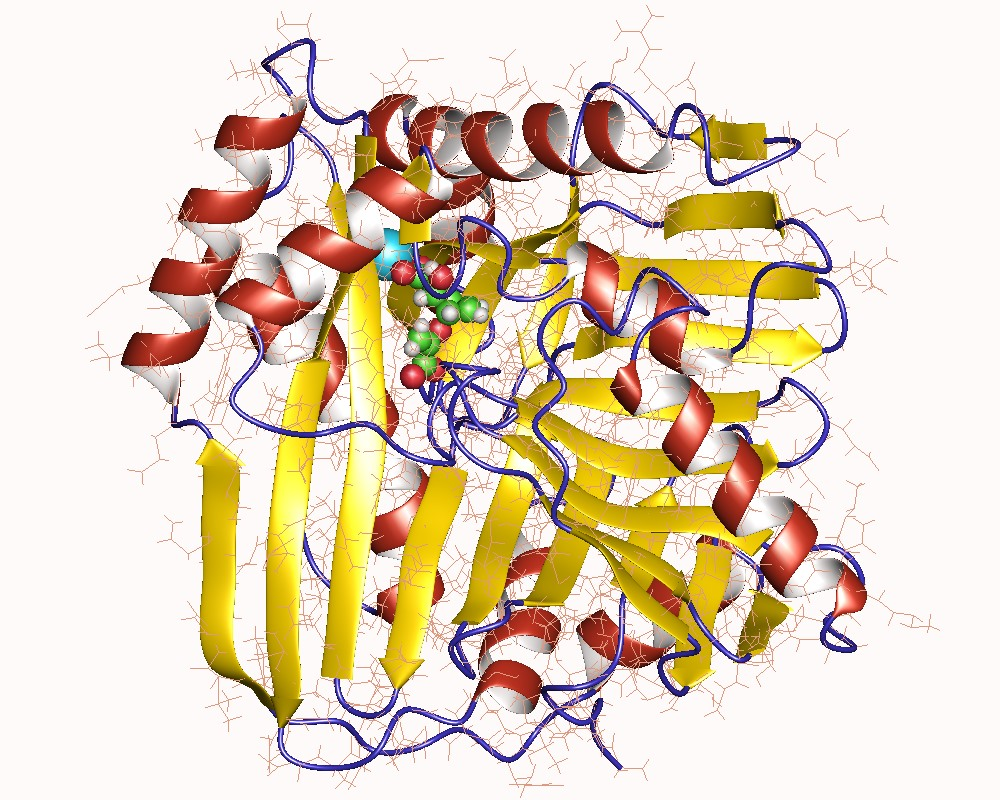
Isochorismate synthase EntC, monomer, E.Coli

MenF is a gene that codes for the isochorismate synthase found in the menaquinone pathway in Escherichia coli, not to be mistaken for the entC gene that codes for the isochorismate synthase found in the enterobactin pathway in Escherichia coli. This enzyme catalyzes the first step in the biosynthesis of salicylic acid in Pseudomonas aeruginosa. Isochorismate synthase has several other homologs that are found in other organisms. These include:

Enzyme Genes/Enzyme Names	Organisms
ICS	Arabidopsis thaliana; Cyanidium caldarium; Glycine max; Nicotiana benthamiana; Populus fremontil; Populus angustifolia; Populus tremuloides
ICS1	Arabidopsis thaliana
ICS1 gene product	Arabidopsis thaliana; Cyanidium caldarium
ICS2	Arabidopsis thaliana
Isochorismate synthase	Arabidopsis thaliana; Cyanidium caldarium; Glycine max
Isochorismate synthase 1	Arapidopsis thaliana
Mbtl	Mycobacterium tuberculosis
PchA	Pseudomonas aeruginosa
