= C15H22O4 =

The molecular formula C_{15}H_{22}O_{4} (molar mass: 266.333 g/mol, exact mass: 266.1518 u) may refer to:

- Agglomerin
- Leptospermone
