= 2-succinyl-6-hydroxy-2,4-cyclohexadiene-1-carboxylate synthase =

InterPro Family

Identifiers
- EC no.: 4.2.99.20
- CAS no.: 122007-88-9

Databases
- BRENDA: enzyme data
- ExPASy: NiceZyme view
- KEGG: enzyme entry
- MetaCyc: metabolic pathway
- Rhea: reactions
- PDB structures: RCSB PDB PDBe PDBsum
Search
- PMC: articles
- PubMed: articles
- NCBI: proteins

2-Succinyl-6-hydroxy-2,4-cyclohexadiene-1-carboxylate synthase (EC 4.2.99.20), also known as SHCHC synthase, is encoded by the menH gene in Escherichia coli and functions in the synthesis of vitamin K. The specific step in the synthetic pathway that SHCHC synthase catalyzes is the conversion of 2-succinyl-5-enolpyruvyl-6-hydroxy-3-cyclohexene-1-carboxylic acid to (1R,6R)-2-succinyl-6-hydroxy-2,4-cyclohexadiene-1-carboxylic acid and pyruvic acid.

== Background ==
Vitamin K is a fat soluble vitamin known to aid in blood clotting. It is recommended that all newborns receive an injection of vitamin K in order to prevent excessive bleeding of the brain after birth. There are two major forms of vitamin K that occur naturally. Phylloquinone, also known as K_{1}, is synthesized by plants and is the major form of vitamin K in the diet. Menaquinone, K_{2}, includes a range of forms that are synthesized by bacteria in the gut.

Vitamin K is synthesized from the molecule chorismate in a nine step conversion process. SHCHC synthase catalyzes the third step in the process.

== Chemistry ==
=== Reaction scheme ===
The previous enzyme in the biosynthetic pathway, SEPHCHC synthase produces 2-succinyl-5-enolpyruvyl-6-hydroxy-3-cyclohexene-1-carboxylic acid (SEPHCHC), which SHCHC synthase converts to the (1R,6R) isomer of 2-succinyl-6-hydroxy-2,4-cyclohexadiene-1-carboxylic acid (SHCHC).

SEPHCHC
SHCHC
Synthase
SHCHC
+
pyruvic acid

=== Enzyme structure ===
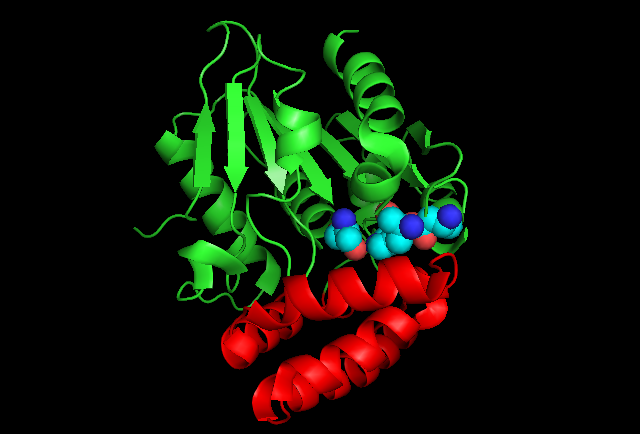
Monomer of MenH enzyme in E.coli (SHCHC synthase). The structure is one continuous amino acid sequence, but the catalytic triad is shown as cyan spheres and the alpha helix cap is shown in red. The rest of the protein sequence is shown in green.

The crystal structure of the MenH enzyme in E.coli (SHCHC synthase) exists as a complex of three protein molecules shown in the diagram. SHCHC synthase forms an alpha/beta hydrolase fold with a central set of seven parallel beta sheets surrounded by alpha helices on both sides. A cap of five alpha helixes serves to enclose the active site. The enzyme exists in an open form until it binds the substrate, when it morphs into a closed form with an active catalytic triad.

Energetic analysis shows that SHCHC synthase has a low energetic burden for catalytic activity. This means the enzyme is more prone to mutation and is one of the most diverse enzymes in the vitamin K synthetic pathway. Only fifteen amino acid residues are absolutely conserved across mutations of the enzyme.

=== Catalytic mechanism ===
The active site contains a catalytic triad of syrine, histine and arginine, which is conserved across all mutants and is proposed to initiate the reaction. The triad residues are located at Ser86, Asp210, and His232. This triad is proposed to catalyze a proton extraction which triggers a transfer of electrons leading to the elimination of pyruvate and formation of SHCHC. Originally, it was proposed that the transition state was stabilized by a nontraditional oxyanion hole. Now a traditional oxyanion hole is favored, but not definitive.

=== Reaction mechanism ===
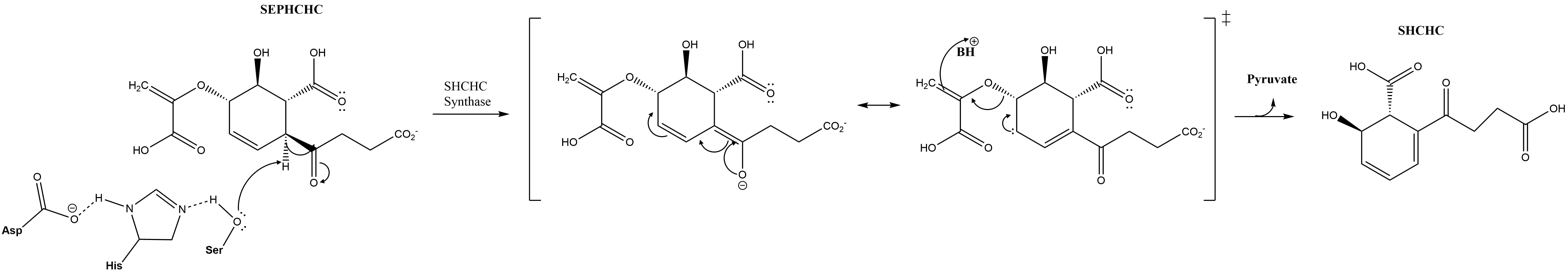

=== Cofactors and alternate reactions ===
SHCHC synthase is unaffected by traditional cofactors such as divalent metal ions and EDTA. The enzyme is fairly specific and only acts on SEPHCHC and close derivatives.

== Controversy ==
MenH (SHCHC synthase) was previously thought to be a thioesterase involved in hydrolyzing DHNA-CoA in a later step of menaquinone synthesis. In 2008, it was determined that MenH has poor catalytic activity toward palmitoyl-CoA, casting doubt on its role as a thioesterase. Direct analysis confirmed that MenH is unable to hydrolyze DHNA-CoA. In 2009, it was proposed that a dedicated hotdog fold thioesterase would be needed to catalyze the hydrolysis of DHNA-CoA. A protein was identified in 2013 that could fit this role.
