= Coarctate reaction =

Chemical reaction with a two-ringed transition state and simultaneous bond reformation

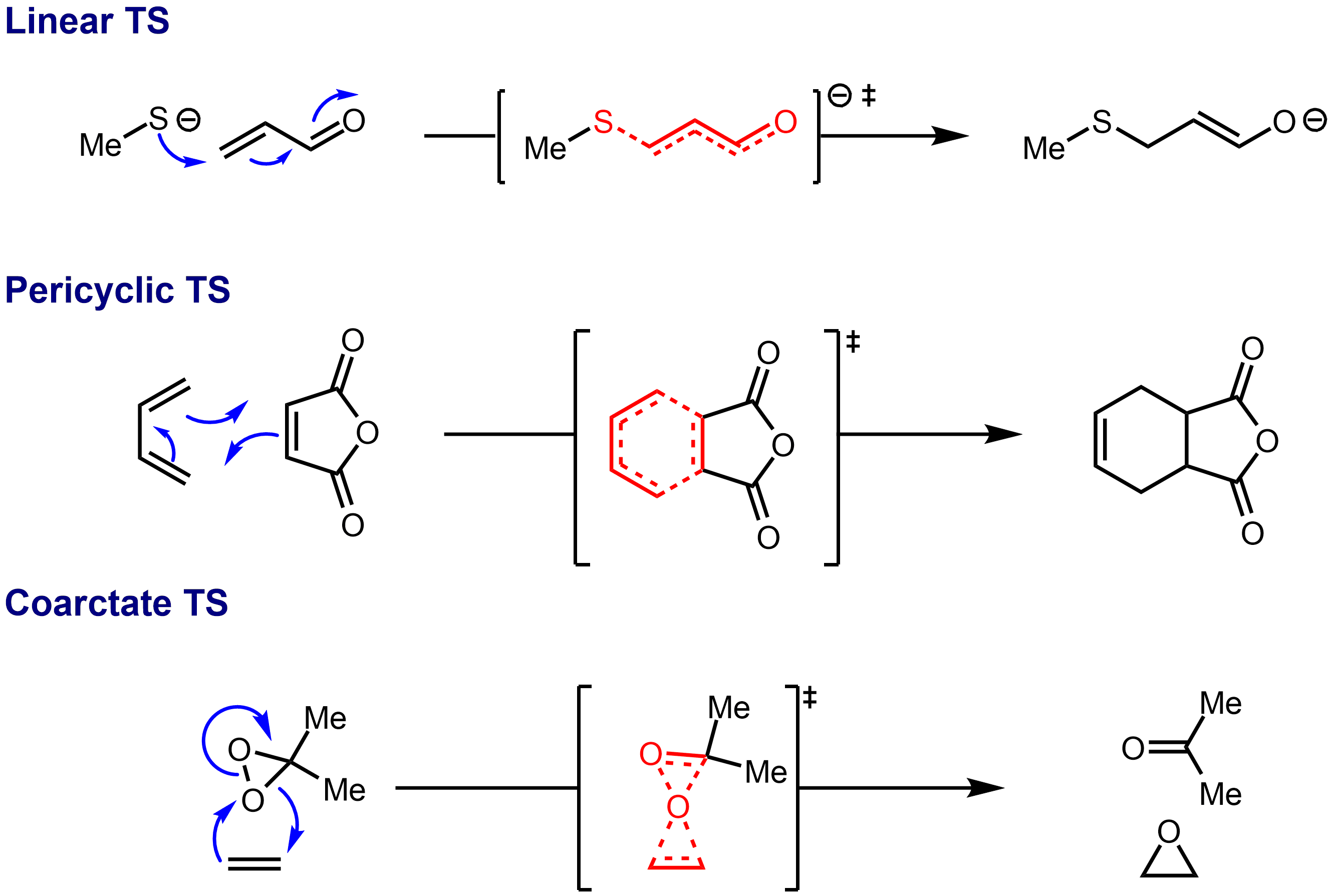
Examples of linear, pericyclic, and coarctate transition states

In organic chemistry, a coarctate reaction is a concerted reaction whose transition state involves two rings, in which at least one atom undergoes the simultaneous making and breaking of two bonds. It is an uncommon reaction topology, compared with linear topology and pericyclic topology (itself subdivided into Hückel and Möbius topologies). The name is derived from Latin coarctare 'to constrict'.

== Transition state topologies ==
Reactions of linear topology are the most common, and consist of all transformations whose transition states are acyclic, including addition, elimination, substitution, and (some types of) fragmentation reactions. By contrast, in pericyclic reactions, the atoms under chemical change form a single closed cycle, and include reactions like the Diels–Alder reaction and Cope rearrangement, among many others.

In contrast to these types of reactions, a coarctate reaction is characterized by a doubly cyclic transition state, in which at least one atom undergoes the simultaneous making and breaking of two bonds. Thus, the topology of the transition state of a coarctate reaction is a constricted cycle that meets with itself (resembling a figure eight) while the topology of pericyclic and linear reactions are a circle (or Möbius strip) and line segment, respectively. The concept was first proposed by Rainer Herges.

== Examples ==
The most well-known example of a coarctate transition state is that of the epoxidation of an olefin by dimethyldioxirane. In this transition state, the oxygen atom transferred to the olefin forms a cycle with the acetone leaving group and a cycle with the olefin undergoing epoxidation. Another well-studied reaction is the fragmentation of spirocyclic ozonides into formaldehyde, CO_{2}, and an olefin.

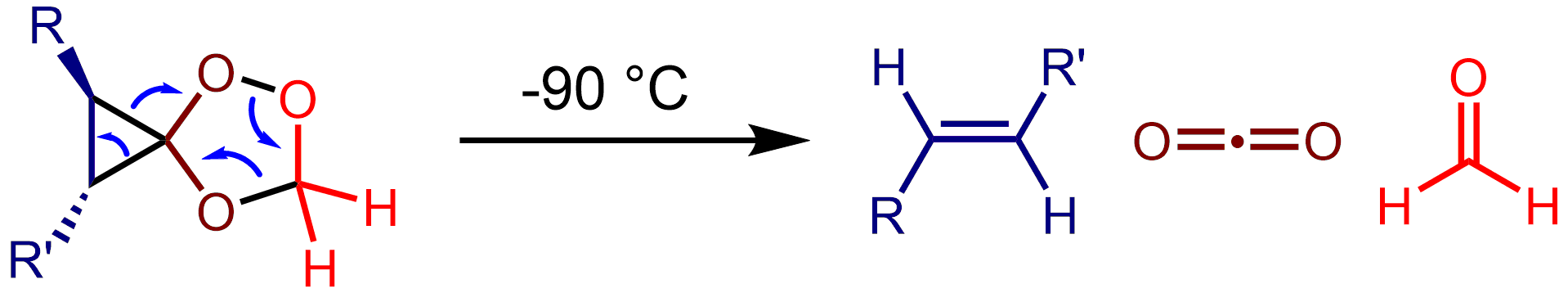

Selection rules, resembling the Woodward-Hoffmann rules, have been proposed to explain patterns in reaction activation energy related to transition state topology or orbital symmetry.
