= Cetacaine =

Combination of
- Benzocaine: Local anesthetic
- Butamben: Local anesthetic
- Tetracaine: Local anesthetic

Identifiers
- CAS Number: 64082-67-3
- ChemSpider: none

Cetacaine is a topical anesthetic that contains the active ingredients benzocaine (14%), butamben (2%), and tetracaine hydrochloride (2%). Cetacaine also contains small amounts of benzalkonium chloride at 0.5% and 0.005% of cetyl dimethyl ethyl ammonium bromide all in a bland water-soluble base. Although Cetacaine has been widely used in the medical and dental fields, it has yet to be officially approved by the FDA. Cetacaine is produced by the company Cetylite Industries, Inc. and they provide Cetacaine in three forms: liquid, gel, and spray.

== Medical uses ==
Cetacaine is a benzocaine-based anesthetic that also contains other active ingredients that include butamben and tetracaine hydrochloride. The main use for this drug is to produce anesthesia to mucous membranes to numb and help control the pain in that area. The spray form of Cetacaine is also used to help prevent gagging in the patient. The anesthetic effect of Cetacaine can be expected to take effect in about 30 seconds and last between 30–60 minutes depending on location and application amount. Cetacaine can and has been used for surgeries that include bronchi, ear, esophagus, larynx, mouth, nose, pharynx, rectal, and vaginal procedures. These procedures can include periodontal treatment, pre-probing, pre-scaling/root planning procedures, pre-injection, and laser dentistry.

=== Available forms ===
The dosage should be applied directly to the site where anesthesia is required. The dosage should be modified according to the patient and there has not been a dosage specified for children.

Spray: Cetacaine spray should be applied for only one second and dosage should not exceed an application spray longer than 2 seconds.

Gel: Use a cotton swab to apply 200 mg to the needed area and the dosage should not exceed 400 mg.

Liquid: Apply 200 mg either directly or by using cotton applicator to the location and the dosage should not exceed 400 mg.

== Adverse effects ==
Cetacaine has been known to cause adverse effects in the patients it has been administered to. These include hypersensitivity in the form of anaphylaxis, dermatitis, erythema, pruritus which can lead to oozing and vesiculation. There have also been accounts of rashes, edema, urticarial and other allergic symptoms as well as methemoglobinemia. Other adverse effects can include: tremors, twitching, dizziness, confusion, hypo-tension, vomiting, euphoria, and blurred or double vision.

=== Pregnancy and breastfeeding ===
It has not been determined of Cetacaine has any adverse defects on the formation of the fetus or if it is transferred through breastfeeding. It is recommended that professional advise should be taken in these regards.

== Pharmacology ==
=== Mechanism of action ===
Cetacaine acts quickly in about 30 seconds and can last between 30–60 minutes. This is due to benzocaine causing the immediate anesthetic effect, while butamben and tetracaine hydrochloride causes the extended effect of Cetacaine.

The actual mechanism for the onset of anesthesia is unknown, but it is believed that the active ingredients reversibly block nerve conduction therefore causing the numbing sensation. This stabilizes the neuron and prevents signals from being transferred.

=== Pharmacokinetics ===
The rate of absorption through the skin and after diffusing in and back out of the nerve membrane it is metabolized by plasma cholinesterase and then excreted in urine.

== Contraindications ==
This product should not be used to cover a large area for anesthetic affect causing an adverse reaction. The liquid and other forms of Cetacaine should not be administered via injection or used under dentures, on eyes or with patients with a cholinesterase deficiency.

== Interactions ==
Cetacaine can have interaction with other drugs being taken by patients one of the interactions that can lead to methemoglobinemia is the interaction with sodium nitrate as well as prilocaine, which can lead to severe illness or death. As well as others listed on the referenced site.

== History ==
The marketing start date for Cetacaine was January 1, 1960, but benzocaine was first produced in 1890 by German scientist 1890 by Eduard Ritsert. Cetacaine is mainly used in the dental field but has seen use as well in the medical field when dealing with small surgeries on or around mucous membranes. Benzocaine-based anesthetics (which includes Cetacaine) have started to come under scrutiny by the FDA. In 2006 the FDA has announced that benzocaine-based anesthetics can cause methemoglobinemia and with that listed warnings and precautions to take when dealing with benzocaine based drugs. The FDA also during this time started to take many Benzocaine based drugs that were not approved off the market and fining those companies they were under.

== Research ==
From looking at the patent bank the only research that has occurred around Cetacaine has been with certain medical procedures that use Cetacaine as an anesthetic or new dispensing containers or methods.

One of the only studies that are current with Cetacaine is the one that the FDA is conducting surrounding the issue of patients contracting methemoglobinemia from the use of Cetacaine. In these studies it was recorded that 319 cases were reported and out of the 319, 32 were considered life-threatening and 3 cases resulted in death.

== Economics ==
=== Cost effectiveness ===
Cetacaine has been used in the medical and dental field for a long time now. Its main competitors have been benzocaine and other benzocaine-based drugs. The use of Cetacaine has allowed for faster in and out times for patients, cheaper costs, easier use for the doctors or dentists needing to apply an anesthetic and better patient compliance (less anxiety).

Cetacaine compared to some of the leading competitors is considered by most a cheaper option. For the spray option the bottle containing 56g can dispense 100 doses and only cost the dentist $0.79 per dose. The liquid Cetacaine that comes in the 30 g bottle can dose 73 full mouths at a cost of about $0.75 per dose.

=== Manufacturer ===
The company the makes Cetacaine is called Cetylite Industries, Inc. This company is based out of Pennsauken, NJ and has a total of 75 employees. Cetylite brings in total revenue of around $7,500,000 with their main product being the topical anesthetics, and infection prevention products.
