= Micromonospora maris =

Scientific classification
- Domain: Bacteria
- Kingdom: Bacillati
- Phylum: Actinomycetota
- Class: Actinomycetia
- Order: Micromonosporales
- Family: Micromonosporaceae
- Genus: Micromonospora
- Species: M. maris

Binomial name
- Micromonospora maris (Goodfellow et al. 2012) Nouioui et al. 2018

Type strain
- AB-18-032; DSM 45365; NRRL B-24793

Synonyms
- Verrucosispora maris Goodfellow et al. 2012

Species of bacterium

Micromonospora maris is a Gram-positive bacterium from the genus Micromonospora which has been isolated from deep-sea sediments from the Sea of Japan. Verrucosispora maris produces abyssomicins and proximicins.
