= Butamben =

Chemical compound

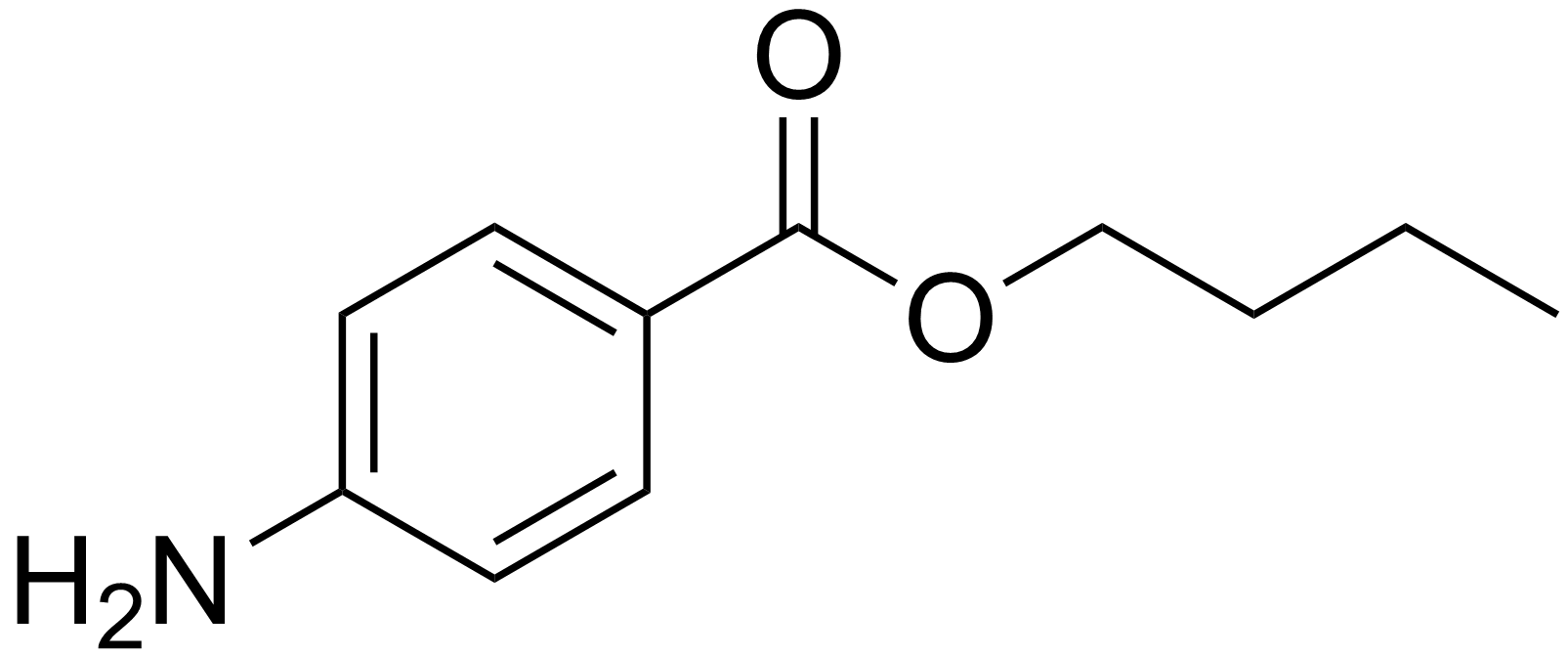

Clinical data
- Other names: n-butyl p-aminobenzoate
- AHFS/Drugs.com: Micromedex Detailed Consumer Information
- Routes of administration: Topical
- ATC code: none

Identifiers
- IUPAC name: Butyl 4-aminobenzoate
- CAS Number: 94-25-7
- PubChem CID: 2482
- ChemSpider: 2388
- UNII: EFW857872Q
- KEGG: D00730
- ChEBI: CHEBI:3231
- ChEMBL: ChEMBL127516
- CompTox Dashboard (EPA): DTXSID7022417
- ECHA InfoCard: 100.002.107

Chemical and physical data
- Formula: C_{11}H_{15}NO_{2}
- Molar mass: 193.246 g·mol^{−1}
- 3D model (JSmol): Interactive image
- Melting point: 58 °C (136 °F)
- SMILES: O=C(OCCCC)c1ccc(N)cc1
- InChI: InChI=1S/C11H15NO2/c1-2-3-8-14-11(13)9-4-6-10(12)7-5-9/h4-7H,2-3,8,12H2,1H3; Key:IUWVALYLNVXWKX-UHFFFAOYSA-N

Butamben is a local anesthetic. Proprietary names includes Alvogil in Spain and Alvogyl in Switzerland. It is one of three components in the topical anesthetic Cetacaine.

== Chemistry ==
It is the ester of 4-aminobenzoic acid and butanol. A white, odourless, crystalline powder. that is mildly soluble in water (1 part in 7000) and soluble in alcohol, ether, chloroform, fixed oils, and dilute acids. It slowly hydrolyses when boiled with water. Synonyms include Butamben, Butilaminobenzoato, and Butoforme.

== Synthesis ==
Patents: ~97%: ~94%: ~88%: NA:

The Fischer esterification of 4-Nitrobenzoic acid [62-23-7] (1) and 1-Butanol [71-36-3] (2) gives n-Butyl 4-Nitrobenzoate [120-48-9] (3). Bechamp reduction then gives Butamben (4).

Alternatively, 4-aminobenzoic acid can be used directly.
