= Risocaine =

Names
- Preferred IUPAC name Propyl 4-aminobenzoate
- Other names 4-Aminobenzoic acid propyl ester

Identifiers
CAS Number	94-12-2
3D model (JSmol)	Interactive image
ChemSpider	6906
ECHA InfoCard	100.002.097
EC Number	202-306-1
MeSH	C067183
PubChem CID	7174
UNII	5CQ88I59ZI
CompTox Dashboard (EPA)	DTXSID3046299
- InChI: InChI=1S/C10H13NO2/c1-2-7-13-10(12)8-3-5-9(11)6-4-8/h3-6H,2,7,11H2,1H3 Key: NBFQYHKHPBMJJV-UHFFFAOYSA-N; InChI=1/C10H13NO2/c1-2-7-13-10(12)8-3-5-9(11)6-4-8/h3-6H,2,7,11H2,1H3 Key: NBFQYHKHPBMJJV-UHFFFAOYAX
- SMILES: O=C(OCCC)c1ccc(N)cc1

Properties
Chemical formula	C_{10}H_{13}NO_{2}
Molar mass	179.21572
- Except where otherwise noted, data are given for materials in their standard state (at 25 °C [77 °F], 100 kPa). verify (what is ?) Infobox references

Risocaine (or propyl 4-aminobenzoate) is a local anesthetic.
