= Lab block =

Specially formulated food for laboratory animals

Lab block is a type of specially formulated food fed to mice and rats kept in a laboratory or as pets. It is commonly accepted as providing all the necessary nutrients in an appropriate quantity in order for the animals to remain healthy. The food is produced as homogenous pellets or extruded pieces, the intention being to minimize the variation in nutritional intake between animals.

The basic type of lab block is made from mainly grains, typically corn, followed by soy, fish meal, animal byproducts, and very high levels of both soluble and insoluble fibers; the ingredient list is provided, but not the proportions. For very specialized use, there's also the "purified diet", which is assembled from individual substances (e.g. casein for protein, corn starch for carbs, soybean oil for fat, cellulose for fiber) in proportions known by the researcher. In both cases, vitamins and minerals are added as required. Drugs may be added to the diet as requested.

Lab animals with compromised immune systems (e.g. nude mice) may require sterilization of food and special packaging. Food made by extrusion cooking is typically already near-aspetic, but blender-mixed purified diets tend to require irradiation or autoclaving.

Alternative names for lab blocks include:

- Grain-based, general-purpose: "mouse diet", "rodent chow", "grain-based diet", "standard chow"
- Grain-based, customized: "custom diet","special diet"
- Purified: "purified chow", "purified ingredient diet", "defined diet"

== Non-laboratory use ==
Lab blocks are also used in pets. They are often also fed to hamsters.

== Contaminants ==
Although a 2015 article claims to have detected various toxins in lab rodent food, a review by EFSA found that most reported levels were only barely above detection limit and far below legal limits. A few diets did have above-legal levels of lead, but no change of the EU regulatory feeding-test framework was deemed needed.
