= Leteprinim =

Chemical compound

Clinical data
- ATC code: none

Identifiers
- IUPAC name: 4-{[3-(6-oxo-3,6-dihydro-9H-purin-9-yl)propanoyl]amino}benzoic acid
- CAS Number: 138117-50-7
- PubChem CID: 132123
- ChemSpider: 116710
- UNII: NBY3IU407M
- CompTox Dashboard (EPA): DTXSID00160496

Chemical and physical data
- Formula: C_{15}H_{13}N_{5}O_{4}
- Molar mass: 327.300 g·mol^{−1}
- 3D model (JSmol): Interactive image
- SMILES: C1=CC(=CC=C1C(=O)O)NC(=O)CCN2C=NC3=C2NC=NC3=O
- InChI: InChI=1S/C15H13N5O4/c21-11(19-10-3-1-9(2-4-10)15(23)24)5-6-20-8-18-12-13(20)16-7-17-14(12)22/h1-4,7-8H,5-6H2,(H,19,21)(H,23,24)(H,16,17,22); Key:JMPOIZCOJJMTHI-UHFFFAOYSA-N

Leteprinim (Neotrofin, AIT-082) is a hypoxanthine derivative drug with neuroprotective and nootropic effects. It stimulates release of nerve growth factors and enhances survival of neurons in the brain, and is under development as a potential treatment for neurodegenerative disorders such as Alzheimer's disease, Parkinson's disease and stroke.
