= Salicylate synthase =

Salicylate synthase is an enzyme that catalyzes the chemical reaction:

chorismate → salicylic acid

MbtI is the responsible enzyme from Mycobacterium tuberculosis.
