= Agglomerin =

Bacterial metablolites

Agglomerin A
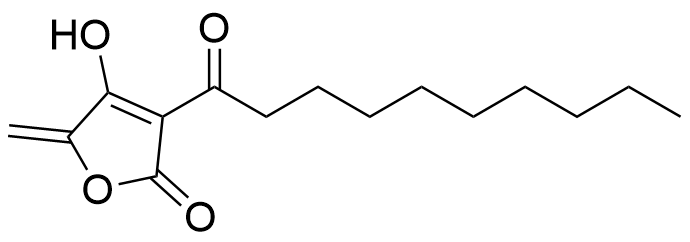

Names
- Preferred IUPAC name 3-Decanoyl-4-hydroxy-5-methylidenefuran-2(5H)-one
- Other names 3-[(Z)-1-hydroxydecylidene]-5-methylenetetrahydrofuran-2,4-dione

Identifiers
CAS Number	125620-70-4
3D model (JSmol)	Interactive image
ChEMBL	ChEMBL301568
ChemSpider	19982638
PubChem CID	54697845
CompTox Dashboard (EPA)	DTXSID90154804
- InChI: InChI=1S/C15H22O4/c1-3-4-5-6-7-8-9-10-12(16)13-14(17)11(2)19-15(13)18/h17H,2-10H2,1H3 Key: YFNGFFUIVKWQHE-UHFFFAOYSA-N
- SMILES: O=C(C1=C(O)C(OC1=O)=C)CCCCCCCCC

Properties
Chemical formula	C_{15}H_{22}O_{4}
Molar mass	266.34 g/mol
Appearance	Colorless crystalline powders (Na salt)
Melting point	113-115 (A), 85-88 (B), 125-128 (C), 103-106 (D)
Solubility in water	Insoluble (Na salt)
- Except where otherwise noted, data are given for materials in their standard state (at 25 °C [77 °F], 100 kPa). Infobox references

Agglomerins are bacterial natural products, identified as metabolites of Pantoea agglomerans which was isolated in 1989 from river water in Kobe, Japan. They belong to the class of tetronate antibiotics, which include tetronomycin, tetronasin, and abyssomicin C. The members of the agglomerins differ only in the composition of the acyl chain attached to the tetronate ring. They possess antibiotic activity against anaerobic bacteria and weak activity against aerobic bacteria in vitro. The structures were solved in 1990. Agglomerin A is the major component (38%), followed by agglomerin B (30%), agglomerin C (24%), and agglomerin D (8%).

== Biosynthesis ==
The biosynthetic gene cluster for agglomerins is 12 kb, and codes for 7 open reading frames. The glyceryl-S-ACP is derived from D-1,3-bisphosphoglycerate by Agg2 (glyceryl-S-ACP synthase) and Agg3 (acyl carrier protein). The acyl chain is taken from primary metabolism as a 3-oxoacyl-CoA thioester. The glyceryl-S-ACP and 3-oxoacyl-CoA thioester are joined by Agg1, a FabH-like ketosynthase, forming new C-C and C-O bonds. The primary alcohol of the intermediate 4 is then acylated by Agg4, using acetyl-CoA, before the abstraction of a proton and concomitant loss of acetate catalyzed by Agg5 to generate the exocyclic double bond.

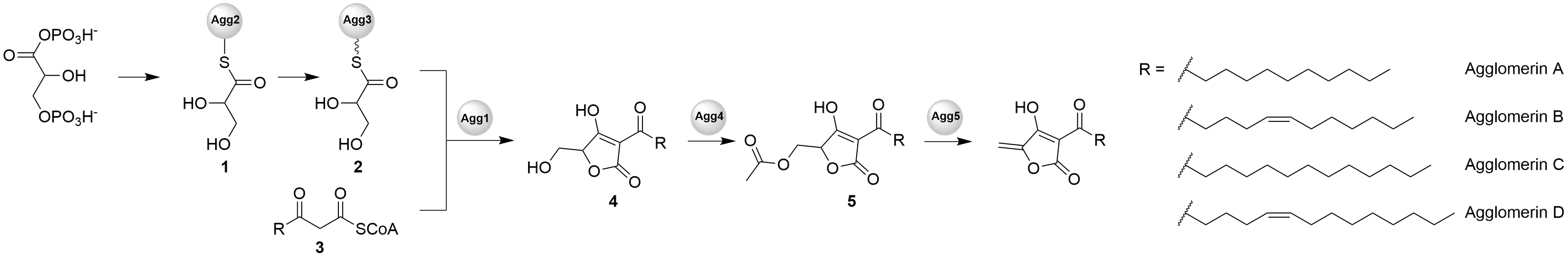
Agglomerin biosynthesis – the biosynthesis of agglomerins A-D by Agg1, Agg2, Agg3, Agg4 and Agg5
