= Chorismate lyase =

Identifiers
- EC no.: 4.1.3.40
- CAS no.: 157482-18-3

Databases
- BRENDA: enzyme data
- ExPASy: NiceZyme view
- KEGG: enzyme entry
- MetaCyc: metabolic pathway
- Rhea: reactions
- PDB structures: RCSB PDB PDBe PDBsum
Search
- PMC: articles
- PubMed: articles
- NCBI: proteins

The enzyme chorismate lyase (EC 4.1.3.40) catalyzes the first step in ubiquinone biosynthesis, the removal of pyruvate from chorismate, to yield 4-hydroxybenzoate in Escherichia coli and other Gram-negative bacteria. It belongs to the family of lyases, specifically the oxo-acid-lyases, which cleave carbon-carbon bonds. The systematic name of this enzyme class is chorismate pyruvate-lyase (4-hydroxybenzoate-forming). Other names in common use include CL, CPL, and UbiC.

This enzyme catalyses the chemical reaction:

chorismate $\rightleftharpoons$ 4-hydroxybenzoate + pyruvate

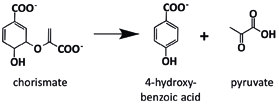
The chorismate pyruvate lyase (CPL) catalyzed reaction.

Its activity does not require metal cofactors.

== Activity ==
Chorismate lyase
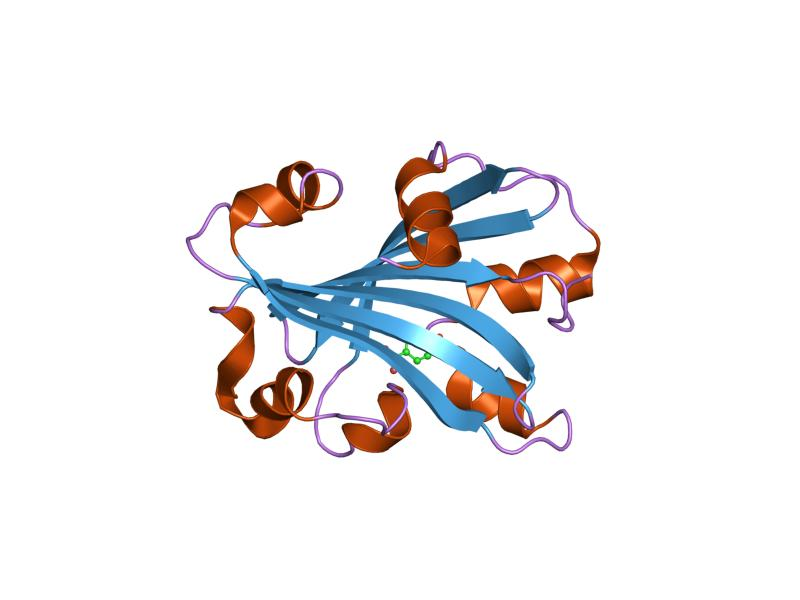
- chorismate lyase with product, 1.0 a resolution

Identifiers
- Symbol: Chor_lyase
- Pfam: PF04345
- Pfam clan: CL0122
- InterPro: IPR007440
- SCOP2: 1jd3 / SCOPe / SUPFAM
Available protein structures:
- PDB: IPR007440 PF04345 (ECOD; PDBsum)
- AlphaFold: IPR007440; PF04345

=== Catalytic activity ===
- This enzyme has an optimum pH at 7.5

=== Enzymatic activity ===
Inhibited by:

- Vanillate
- 4-hydroxybenzaldehyde
- 3-carboxylmethylaminmethyl-4-hydroxybenzoic acid
- 4HB - ubiC is inhibited by the product of the reaction, which scientists believe serves as a control mechanism for the pathway

== Pathway ==
The pathway used is called the ubiquinone biosynthesis pathway, it catalyzes the first step in the biosynthesis of ubiquinone in E. coli. Ubiquinone is a lipid-soluble electron-transporting coenzyme. They are essential electron carriers in prokaryotes and are essential in aerobic organisms to achieve ATP synthesis.

== Nomenclature ==
There are several different names for chorismate lyase. It is also called chorismate pyruvate lyase (4-hydroxybenzoate-forming) and it is also abbreviated several different ways: CPL, CL, and ubiC. It is sometimes referred to as ubiC, because that is the gene name. This enzyme belongs to the class lyases; more specifically the ox-acid-lyase or the carbon-carbon-lyases.

Taxonomic lineage:

1. bacteria → proteobacteria → gammaproteobacteria → enterobacteriales → enterobacteriaceae → escherichia → Escherichia coli

== Structure ==
This enzyme is a monomer. Its secondary structure contains helixes, turns, and beta-strands. It has a mass of 18,777 daltons and its sequence is 165 amino acids long.

=== Binding sites ===
- position: 35(M)
- position: 77(R)
- position: 115(L)

== Mutagenesis ==
- position: 91G → A; increases product inhibition by 40%. No effect on substrate affinity.
- position: 156E → K; loss of activity
