= Atrop-abyssomicin C =

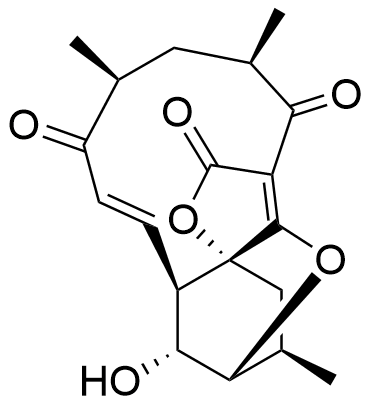

Names
- IUPAC name 12,14a,3-(Epoxymethyno)-2H-1-benzoxacyclododecin-2,4,8(5H,10aH)-trione, 6,7,11,12,13,14-hexahydro-11-hydroxy-5,7,13-trimethyl-, (5R,7S,9E,10aR,11R,12R,13R,14aR)
- Other names Atrop-abyssomicin C

Identifiers
CAS Number	725254-09-1
3D model (JSmol)	Interactive image
ChEMBL	ChEMBL2204369
ChemSpider	29213358
PubChem CID	23232701
- InChI: InChI=1S/C19H22O6/c1-8-6-9(2)14(21)13-17-19(25-18(13)23)7-10(3)16(24-17)15(22)11(19)4-5-12(8)20/h4-5,8-11,15-16,22H,6-7H2,1-3H3/b5-4+/t8-,9+,10+,11?,15+,16?,19+/m0/s1 Key: FNEADFUPWHAVTA-WDQYZCCLSA-N
- SMILES: C[C@@H]1C[C@]23OC(=O)C4=C2OC1[C@H](O)C3\C=C\C(=O)[C@@H](C)C[C@@H](C)C4=O

Properties
Chemical formula	C_{19}H_{22}O_{6}
Molar mass	346.38 g/mol
Density	1.34±0.1 g/cm3 (Predicted)
Melting point	180 °C (decomp)
Boiling point	597.5±50.0 °C (Predicted)
- Except where otherwise noted, data are given for materials in their standard state (at 25 °C [77 °F], 100 kPa). Infobox references

Atrop-abyssomicin C is a polycyclic polyketide-type natural product that is the atropisomer of abyssomicin C. It is a spirotetronate that belongs to the class of tetronate antibiotics, which includes compounds such as tetronomycin, agglomerin, and chlorothricin. In 2006, the Nicolaou group discovered atrop-abyssomicin C while working on the total synthesis of abyssomicin C. Then in 2007, Süssmuth and co-workers isolated atrop-abyssomicin C from Verrucosispora maris AB-18-032, a marine actinomycete found in sediment of the Japanese sea. They found that atrop-abyssomicin C was the major metabolite produced by this strain, while abyssomicin C was a minor product. The molecule displays antibacterial activity by inhibiting the enzyme PabB (4-amino-4-deoxychorismate synthase), thereby depleting the biosynthesis of p-aminobenzoate.

== Structure ==
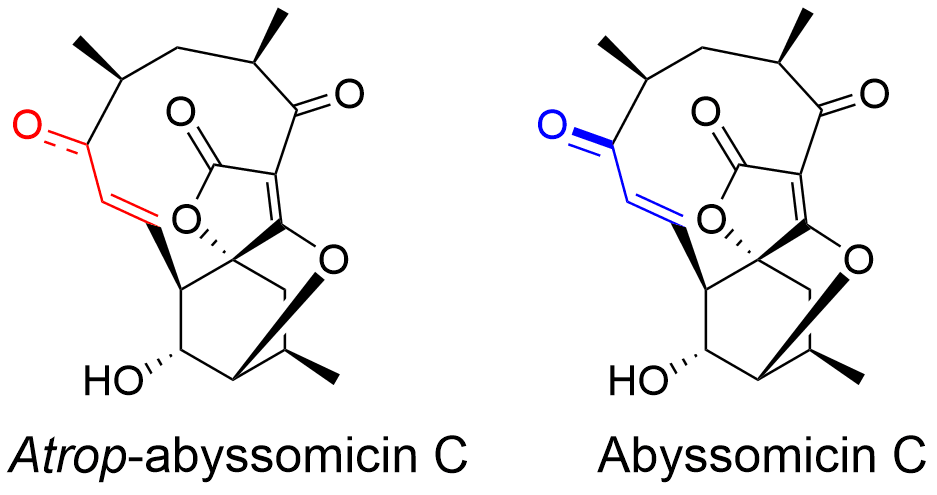
Structure of Atrop-abyssomicin C and Abyssomicin C.

Atrop-abyssomicin C has a complex, yet intriguing structural topography. The compound contains an oxabicyclo[2.2.2]octane system fused to the tetronate moiety. The 11-membered macrocyclic ring carries an α,β-unsaturated ketone that was proposed to be the reactive center. Despite being a strained macrocycle, there exist an atropisomer, abyssomicin C. The atropisomerism arise due to a structural deviation in the α,β-unsaturated ketone region of the molecule. The orientation of the carbonyl in atrop-abyssomicin C is cisoid, whereas the conformation in abyssomicin C is transoid. The enone moiety of atrop-abyssomicin C has a higher degree of the conjugation, which makes it a more active Michael acceptor.

== Biosynthesis ==
The biosynthesis of atrop-abyssomicin C begins with the synthesis of a linear polyketide chain in a PKS I system that consist of one loading and six extension modules. The polyketide chain is made from five acetates, two propionates, and the glycolytic pathway metabolite. D-1,3-bisphosphoglycerate, the glycolytic metabolite, is transferred to AbyA3 (an acyl-carrier protein) by AbyA2 to generate the glyceryl-ACP. AbyA1 facilitates the attachment of the glyceryl-ACP to the polyketide chain and the detachment of the polyketide from the polyketide synthase to form intermediate 2.

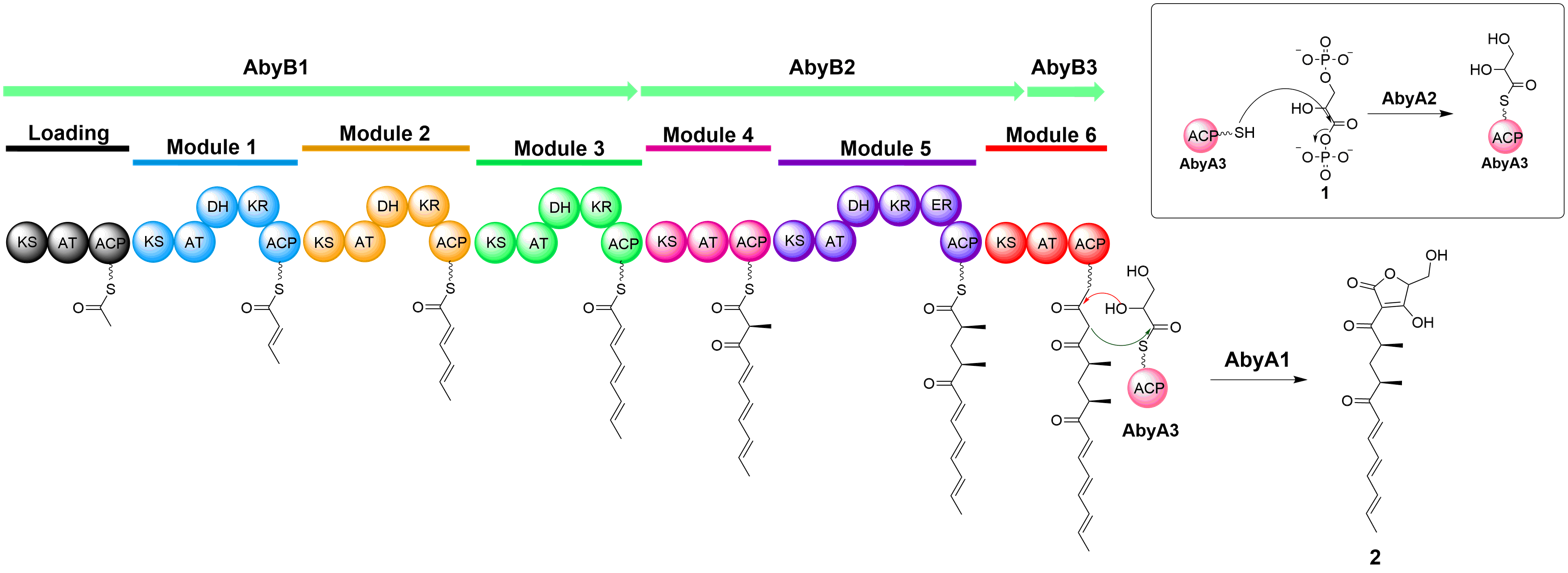
Biosynthesis of linear polyketide precursor. The AbyB1, AbyB2, and AbyB3 genes code for the seven-module polyketide synthase complex that assembled the polyketide backbone. Next, the linear polyketide precursor fused with glyceryl-ACP to form intermediate 2.

Based on the observation made for the biosynthesis of agglomerin, it has been proposed that AbyA4 acetylates intermediate 2 and AbyA5 catalyzes the elimination of acetic acid to form the exocyclic double bond in intermediate 4. An intramolecular Diels-Alder was proposed to take place between the exocyclic olefin and the conjugated diene at the tail end of the polyketide to form the macrocyclic ring. It has been reported that the previously unidentified Abycyc gene could code for an enzyme that carries out the Diels-Alder cycloaddition. Following the Diels-Alder reaction, an epoxide ring is formed and then opened by the tetronate hydroxyl group to form atrop-abyssomicin C. It has been postulated that the AbyE monooxygenase catalyzes epoxide formation.

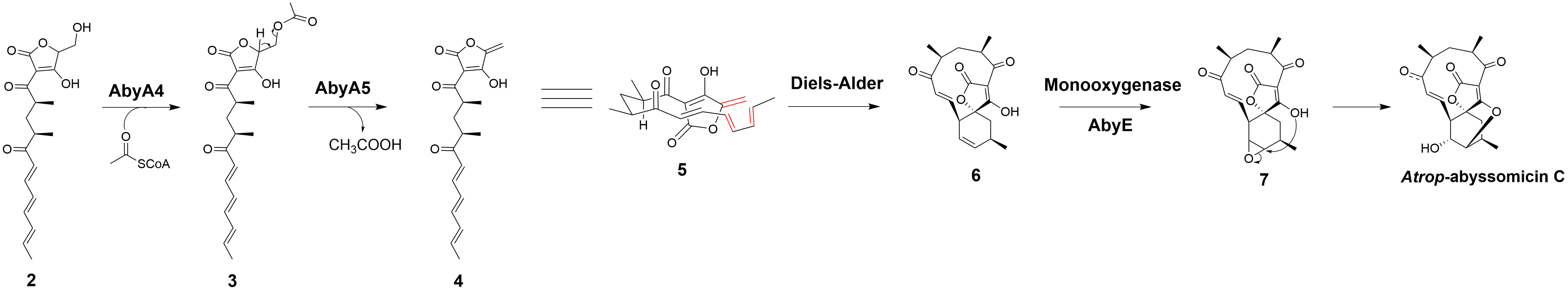
Cycloaddition to form atrop-abyssomicin C. Intermediate 2 undergo an acetylation and elimination step to form the exocyclic olefin. An intramolecular Diels–Alder reaction is carried out to form the macrocyclic ring. Next, an oxygenation step follows by a ring opening reaction leads to atrop-abyssomicin C formation.
