= Aminodeoxychorismate lyase =

Class of enzymes

4-amino-4-deoxychorismate lyase

Identifiers
- EC no.: 4.1.3.38

Databases
- IntEnz: IntEnz view
- BRENDA: BRENDA entry
- ExPASy: NiceZyme view
- KEGG: KEGG entry
- MetaCyc: metabolic pathway
- PRIAM: profile
- PDB structures: RCSB PDB PDBe PDBsum
- Gene Ontology: AmiGO / QuickGO
Search
- PMC: articles
- PubMed: articles
- NCBI: proteins

4-amino-4-deoxychorismate lyase (EC 4.1.3.38) is an enzyme that participates in folate biosynthesis by catalyzing the production of PABA by the following reaction

4-amino-4-deoxychorismate $\rightleftharpoons$ 4-aminobenzoate + pyruvate

This enzyme belongs to the family of lyases, specifically the oxo-acid-lyases, which cleave carbon-carbon bonds. This enzyme, encoded by the pabC gene in bacteria and plants, is also known as PabC or ADC lyase. The fungal enzyme has been designated ABZ2.

All known examples of 4-amino-4-deoxychorismate lyase bind PLP (pyridoxal-5'-phosphate), a cofactor employed during catalysis.
