= Chorismic acid =

- Chemical structure of chorismic acid

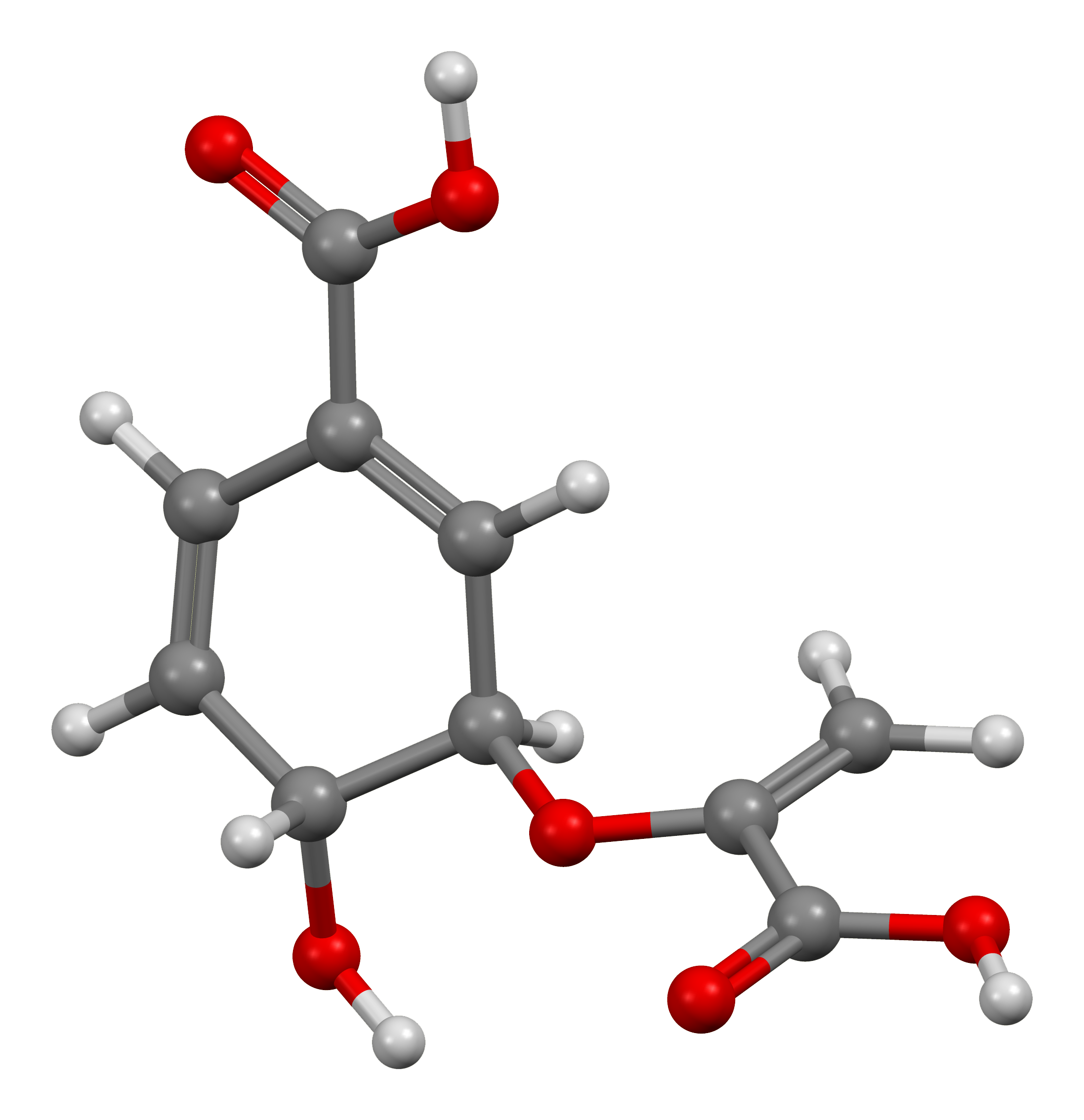

Names
- IUPAC name (3R,4R)-3-[(1-carboxyvinyl)oxy]-4-hydroxycyclohexa-1,5-diene-1-carboxylic acid

Identifiers
CAS Number	617-12-9
3D model (JSmol)	Interactive image
ChEBI	CHEBI:17333
ChemSpider	11542
ECHA InfoCard	100.164.204
PubChem CID	12039
UNII	GI1BLY82Y1
CompTox Dashboard (EPA)	DTXSID50210697
- InChI: InChI=1S/C10H10O6/c1-5(9(12)13)16-8-4-6(10(14)15)2-3-7(8)11/h2-4,7-8,11H,1H2,(H,12,13)(H,14,15)/t7-,8-/m1/s1 Key: WTFXTQVDAKGDEY-HTQZYQBOSA-N; InChI=1/C10H10O6/c1-5(9(12)13)16-8-4-6(10(14)15)2-3-7(8)11/h2-4,7-8,11H,1H2,(H,12,13)(H,14,15)/t7-,8-/m1/s1 Key: WTFXTQVDAKGDEY-HTQZYQBOBD
- SMILES: O=C(O)C1=C/[C@@H](O/C(C(=O)O)=C)[C@H](O)/C=C1

Properties
Chemical formula	C_{10}H_{10}O_{6}
Molar mass	226.184 g·mol^{−1}
Melting point	140 °C (284 °F; 413 K)

Hazards
- GHS labelling
Pictograms	(GHS07: Exclamation mark) (GHS08: Health hazard)
Signal word	Danger
Hazard statements	H302, H312, H315, H319, H332, H335, H350, H361
Precautionary statements	P201, P202, P261, P264, P270, P271, P280, P281, P301+P312, P302+P352, P304+P312, P304+P340, P305+P351+P338, P308+P313, P312, P321, P322, P330, P332+P313, P337+P313, P362, P363, P403+P233, P405, P501
- Except where otherwise noted, data are given for materials in their standard state (at 25 °C [77 °F], 100 kPa). verify (what is ?) Infobox references

Chorismic acid, more commonly known as its anionic form chorismate, is an important biochemical intermediate in plants and microorganisms. It is a precursor for:

- The aromatic amino acids phenylalanine, tryptophan, and tyrosine
- Indole, indole derivatives and tryptophan
- 2,3-Dihydroxybenzoic acid (DHB) used for enterobactin biosynthesis
- The plant hormone salicylic acid
- Many alkaloids and other aromatic metabolites.
- The folate precursor para-aminobenzoate (pABA)
- The biosynthesis of vitamin K and folate in plants and microorganisms.

The name chorismic acid derives from a classical Greek word χωρίζω meaning "to separate", because the compound plays a role as a branch-point in aromatic amino acid biosynthesis.

== Biosynthesis ==
Shikimate → shikimate-3-phosphate → 5-enolpyruvylshikimate-3-phosphate (5-O-(1-carboxyvinyl)-3-phosphoshikimate)

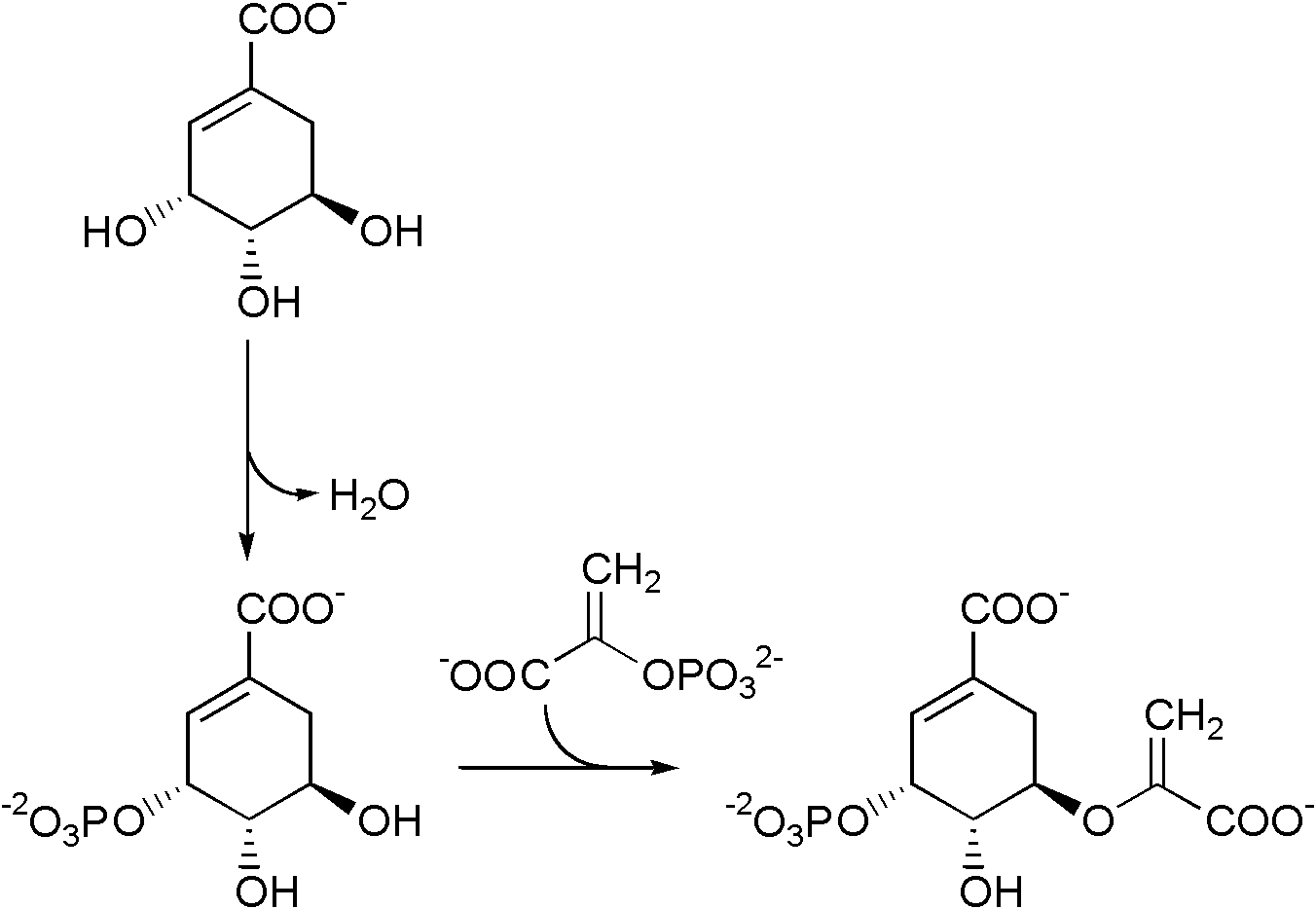

Chorismate synthase is an enzyme that catalyzes the final chemical reaction:

5-O-(1-carboxyvinyl)-3-phosphoshikimate → chorismate + phosphate.
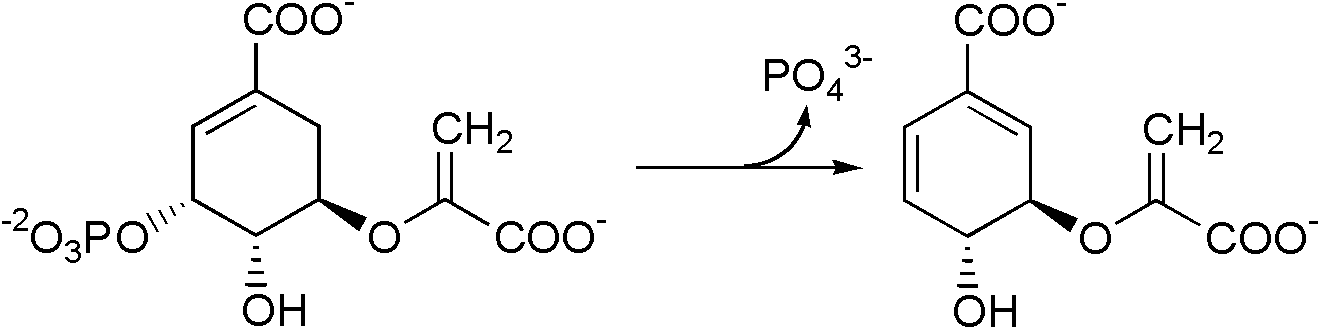

== Metabolism ==
Chorismate is transformed into para-aminobenzoic acid by the enzymes 4-amino-4-deoxychorismate synthase and 4-amino-4-deoxychorismate lyase.

Chorismate lyase is an enzyme that transforms chorismate into 4-hydroxybenzoate and pyruvate. This enzyme catalyses the first step in ubiquinone biosynthesis in Escherichia coli and other Gram-negative bacteria.

== See also ==
- C_{10}H_{10}O_{6}
- Isochorismic acid
- Salicylate synthase
