= Isochorismic acid =

Names
- IUPAC name (5S,6S)-5-(1-carboxylatoethenoxy)-6-hydroxycyclohexa-1,3-diene-1-carboxylate

Identifiers
CAS Number	22642-82-6
3D model (JSmol)	Interactive image; isochorismate(2-): Interactive image
Beilstein Reference	8334070 isochorismate(2-): 2943868
ChEBI	CHEBI:17582; isochorismate(2-): CHEBI:29780
ChemSpider	164276; isochorismate(2-): 26329824
DrugBank	DB02793
KEGG	C00885
PubChem CID	5460580; isochorismate(2-): 5460580
CompTox Dashboard (EPA)	DTXSID20945303
- InChI: InChI=1S/C10H10O6/c1-5(9(12)13)16-7-4-2-3-6(8(7)11)10(14)15/h2-4,7-8,11H,1H2,(H,12,13)(H,14,15)/t7-,8-/m0/s1 Key: NTGWPRCCOQCMGE-YUMQZZPRSA-N
- SMILES: O=C(O)C(OC1C=CC=C(C(=O)O)C1O)=C; isochorismate(2-): C=C(C(=O)[O-])O[C@H]1C=CC=C([C@@H]1O)C(=O)[O-]

Properties
Chemical formula	C_{10}H_{10}O_{6}
Molar mass	226.184 g·mol^{−1}
Density	1.49 g/cm³

Hazards
Flash point	297.4 °C

Related compounds
Related compounds	isoprephenate, chorismate
- Except where otherwise noted, data are given for materials in their standard state (at 25 °C [77 °F], 100 kPa). Infobox references

Isochorismic acid, also called isochorismate, is an organic dibasic acid synthesized from chorismate.

== Synthesis ==
The enzyme chorismate hydroxymutase (isochorismate synthase, CF 5.4.4.2) reversibly isomerizes chorismate into isochorismate, giving rise to one of the branches of the shikimate pathway. Isochorismate is a precursor in the biosynthesis of many natural compounds. Salicylic acid and terpenoid naphthoquinones (menaquinones, phylloquinones) are synthesized from isochorismate, although in some organisms these compounds can be synthesized from chorismate in alternative ways, not through isochorismate (for example, the futalosine pathway of menaquinone biosynthesis in some prokaryotes).

== Discovery ==
The compound was discovered by Australian researchers in 1968 as an intermediate in the biosynthesis of 2,3-dihydroxybenzoate (ortho-pyrocatechate, an enterobactin precursor) from chorismate in Aerobacter aerogenes. The reaction presumably proceeds via nucleophilic attack of water at the C_{2} carbon atom. The trivial name "isochorismic acid", which has been fixed for the compound, was proposed by these researchers, who described the substance for the first time.

== Properties ==
Isochorismic acid is a thermodynamically unstable compound. In an aqueous solution at room temperature and pH 7, isochorismate decomposes into a mixture of salicylate and meta-carboxyphenylpyruvate. The latter is formed from isoprephenate (also a thermodynamically unstable compound), which arises as a result of the [3,3]-sigmatropic rearrangement of isochorismate.
