= Quinate/shikimate dehydrogenase =

Identifiers
- EC no.: 1.1.1.282

Databases
- IntEnz: IntEnz view
- BRENDA: BRENDA entry
- ExPASy: NiceZyme view
- KEGG: KEGG entry
- MetaCyc: metabolic pathway
- PRIAM: profile
- PDB structures: RCSB PDB PDBe PDBsum
Search
- PMC: articles
- PubMed: articles
- NCBI: proteins

Quinate/shikimate dehydrogenase (EC 1.1.1.282, YdiB) is an enzyme with systematic name L-quinate:NAD(P)^{+} 3-oxidoreductase. This enzyme catalyses the following two chemical reactions:

quinic acid
+ NADP^{+}
H^{+}
H^{+}
3-dehydroquinic acid
+ NADPH
shikimic acid
+ NADP^{+}
H^{+}
H^{+}
3-dehydroshikimic acid
+ NADPH

This is the second shikimate dehydrogenase enzyme found in Escherichia coli and differs from EC 1.1.1.25, shikimate dehydrogenase, in that it can use both quinic acid and shikimic acid as substrates, and either NAD^{+} or NADP^{+} as cofactor.
