= C7H11NO4 =

The molecular formula C_{7}H_{11}NO_{4} (molar mass: 173.17 g/mol, exact mass: 173.0688 u) may refer to:

- ACPD, or 1-Amino-1,3-dicarboxycyclopentane
- Aminoshikimic acid
- Oxaceprol
