= Chlorogenate—glucarate O-hydroxycinnamoyltransferase =

chlorogenate-glucarate O-hydroxycinnamoyltransferase

Identifiers
- EC no.: 2.3.1.98
- CAS no.: 126124-92-3

Databases
- IntEnz: IntEnz view
- BRENDA: BRENDA entry
- ExPASy: NiceZyme view
- KEGG: KEGG entry
- MetaCyc: metabolic pathway
- PRIAM: profile
- PDB structures: RCSB PDB PDBe PDBsum
- Gene Ontology: AmiGO / QuickGO
Search
- PMC: articles
- PubMed: articles
- NCBI: proteins

In enzymology, a chlorogenate-glucarate O-hydroxycinnamoyltransferase (EC 2.3.1.98) is an enzyme that catalyzes the chemical reaction

chlorogenate + glucarate $\rightleftharpoons$ quinate + 2-O-caffeoylglucarate

Thus, the two substrates of this enzyme are chlorogenate and glucarate, whereas its two products are quinate and 2-O-caffeoylglucarate.

This enzyme belongs to the family of transferases, specifically those acyltransferases transferring groups other than aminoacyl groups. The systematic name of this enzyme class is chlorogenate:glucarate O-(hydroxycinnamoyl)transferase. Other names in common use include chlorogenate:glucarate caffeoyltransferase, chlorogenic acid:glucaric acid O-caffeoyltransferase, and chlorogenate:glucarate caffeoyltransferase.
