= ACPD (disambiguation) =

ACPD is the chemical compound 1-Amino-1,3-dicarboxycyclopentane

It may also refer to:

- Aguadilla City Police Department, Puerto Rico
- Albemarle County Police Department, Virginia, US
- Allegheny County Police Department, Pennsylvania, US
- Arlington County Police Department, Virginia, US
- Atlantic City Police Department, New Jersey, US
- Al Arabia Cinema Production & Distribution, Egypt
