= Chlorogenate hydrolase =

Class of enzymes

chlorogenate hydrolase

Identifiers
- EC no.: 3.1.1.42
- CAS no.: 74082-59-0

Databases
- BRENDA: enzyme data
- ExPASy: NiceZyme view
- KEGG: enzyme entry
- MetaCyc: metabolic pathway
- Rhea: reactions
- PDB structures: RCSB PDB PDBe PDBsum
- Gene Ontology: AmiGO / QuickGO
Search
- PMC: articles
- PubMed: articles
- NCBI: proteins

Chlorogenate hydrolase (EC 3.1.1.42) is an enzyme that catalyzes the reaction

chlorogenic acid
H_{2}O
H_{2}O
quinic acid
+
caffeic acid

The enzyme characterised from Aspergillus niger hydrolyses chlorogenic acid to quinic acid and caffeic acid. The enzyme has been used for the large-scale production of its products. Since the reaction is reversible, it has also been used to make alternative esters of caffeic acid.

This enzyme is a hydrolase, specifically one acting on carboxylic ester bonds. The systematic name is chlorogenate hydrolase. Other names in use include chlorogenase, and chlorogenic acid esterase.
