= Shikimic acid =

Chemical structure of shikimic acid
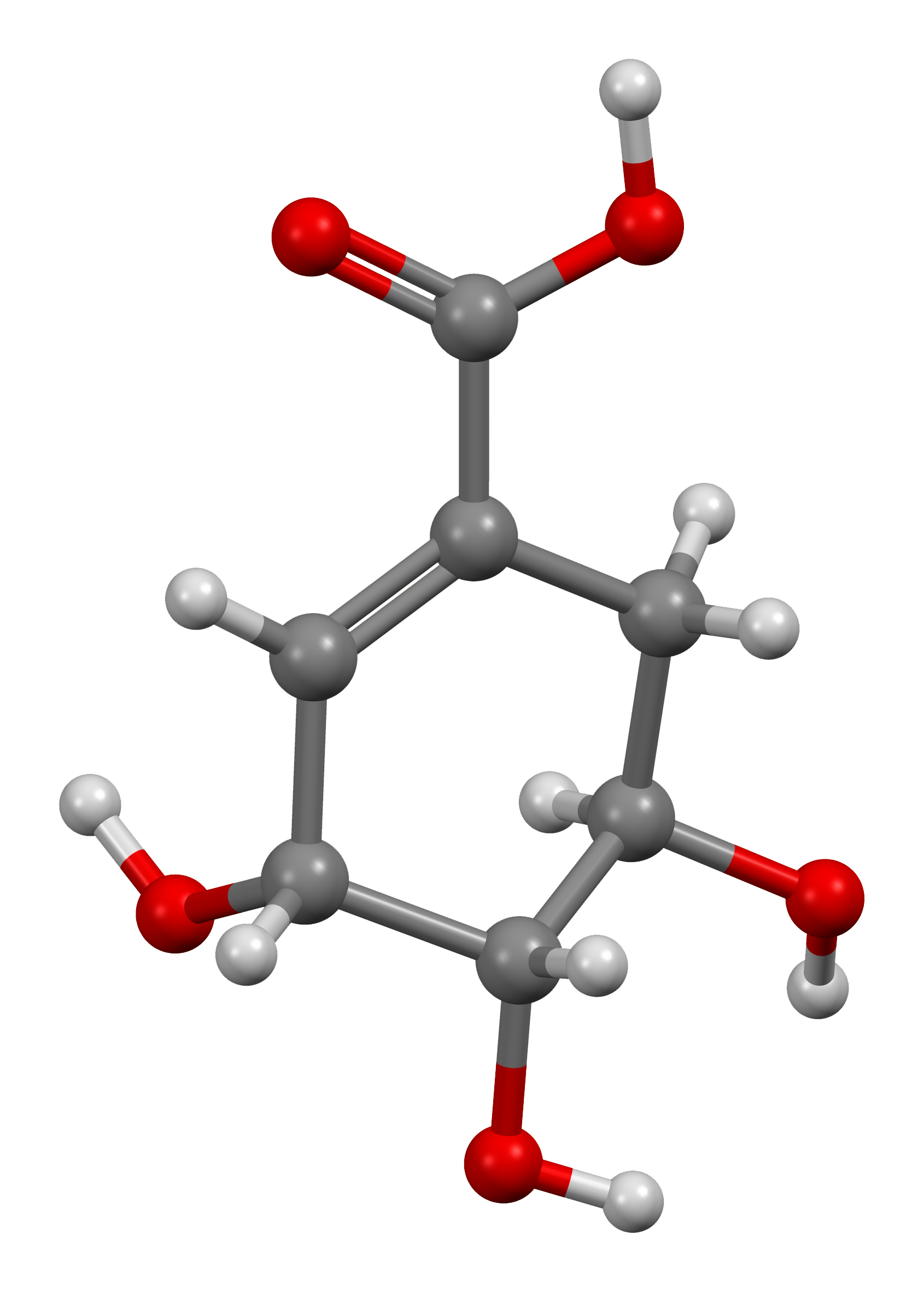
3D model of shikimic acid

Names
- Preferred IUPAC name (3R,4S,5R)-3,4,5-Trihydroxycyclohex-1-ene-1-carboxylic acid

Identifiers
CAS Number	138-59-0
3D model (JSmol)	Interactive image
ChEBI	CHEBI:16119
ChEMBL	ChEMBL290345
ChemSpider	8412
ECHA InfoCard	100.004.850
EC Number	205-334-2
KEGG	C00493
PubChem CID	8742
UNII	29MS2WI2NU
CompTox Dashboard (EPA)	DTXSID4032039
- InChI: InChI=1S/C7H10O5/c8-4-1-3(7(11)12)2-5(9)6(4)10/h1,4-6,8-10H,2H2,(H,11,12)/t4-,5-,6-/m1/s1 Key: JXOHGGNKMLTUBP-HSUXUTPPSA-N; InChI=1/C7H10O5/c8-4-1-3(7(11)12)2-5(9)6(4)10/h1,4-6,8-10H,2H2,(H,11,12)/t4-,5-,6-/m1/s1/f/h11H; InChI=1/C7H10O5/c8-4-1-3(7(11)12)2-5(9)6(4)10/h1,4-6,8-10H,2H2,(H,11,12)/t4-,5-,6-/m1/s1 Key: JXOHGGNKMLTUBP-HSUXUTPPBZ
- SMILES: C1[C@H]([C@@H]([C@@H](C=C1C(=O)O)O)O)O

Properties
Chemical formula	C_{7}H_{10}O_{5}
Molar mass	174.15 g/mol
Melting point	185 to 187 °C (365 to 369 °F; 458 to 460 K)
- Except where otherwise noted, data are given for materials in their standard state (at 25 °C [77 °F], 100 kPa). verify (what is ?) Infobox references

Shikimic acid, more commonly known as its anionic form shikimate, is a cyclohexene, a cyclitol and a cyclohexanecarboxylic acid. It is an important biochemical metabolite in plants and microorganisms. Its name comes from the Japanese flower shikimi (シキミ, the Japanese star anise, Illicium anisatum), from which it was first isolated in 1885 by Johan Fredrik Eykman. The elucidation of its structure was made nearly 50 years later.

== Biosynthesis ==
Phosphoenolpyruvate and erythrose-4-phosphate condense to form 3-deoxy-D-arabinoheptulosonate-7-phosphate (DAHP), in a reaction catalyzed by the enzyme DAHP synthase. DAHP is then transformed to 3-dehydroquinate (DHQ), in a reaction catalyzed by DHQ synthase. Although this reaction requires nicotinamide adenine dinucleotide (NAD) as a cofactor, the enzymic mechanism regenerates it, resulting in the net use of no NAD.

Biosynthesis of 3-dehydroquinate from phosphoenolpyruvate and erythrose-4-phosphate

DHQ is dehydrated to 3-dehydroshikimic acid by the enzyme 3-dehydroquinate dehydratase, which is reduced to shikimic acid by the enzyme shikimate dehydrogenase, which uses nicotinamide adenine dinucleotide phosphate (NADPH) as a cofactor.

== Shikimate pathway ==
=== Biosynthesis of the aromatic amino acids ===
The shikimate pathway, named after shikimic acid as important intermediate, is a seven-step metabolic route used by bacteria, fungi, algae, parasites, and plants for the biosynthesis of aromatic amino acids (phenylalanine, tyrosine, and tryptophan). This pathway is not found in animals; therefore, phenylalanine and tryptophan are essential nutrients and must be obtained from the animal's diet. Tyrosine is not essential, as it can be synthesized from phenylalanine, except for individuals unable to hydroxylate phenylalanine to tyrosine.

=== Use in biosynthesis ===
Phenylalanine and tyrosine are the precursors used in the phenylpropanoids biosynthesis. The phenylpropanoids are then used to produce the flavonoids, coumarins, tannins and lignin. The first enzyme involved is phenylalanine ammonia-lyase (PAL) that converts L-phenylalanine to trans-cinnamic acid and ammonia.

==== Gallic acid biosynthesis ====
Gallic acid is formed from 3-dehydroshikimate by the action of the enzyme shikimate dehydrogenase to produce 3,5-didehydroshikimate. This latter compound spontaneously rearranges to gallic acid.

=== Other compounds ===
Shikimic acid is a precursor for:

- indole, indole derivatives and aromatic amino acid tryptophan and tryptophan derivatives such as the psychedelic compound dimethyltryptamine
- many alkaloids and other aromatic metabolites

==== Mycosporine-like amino acids ====
Mycosporine-like amino acids are small secondary metabolites produced by organisms that live in environments with high volumes of sunlight, usually marine environments.

== Uses ==
In the pharmaceutical industry, shikimic acid from the Chinese star anise (Illicium verum) is used as a base material for production of oseltamivir (Tamiflu). Although shikimic acid is present in most autotrophic organisms, it is a biosynthetic intermediate and in general found in very low concentrations. The low isolation yield of shikimic acid from the Chinese star anise is blamed for the 2005 shortage of oseltamivir. Shikimic acid can also be extracted from the seeds of the sweetgum (Liquidambar styraciflua) fruit, which is abundant in North America, in yields of around 1.5%. For example, 4 kg (8.8 lb) of sweetgum seeds is needed for fourteen packages of Tamiflu. By comparison, star anise has been reported to yield 3% to 7% shikimic acid. Biosynthetic pathways in E. coli have recently been enhanced to allow the organism to accumulate enough material to be used commercially. A 2010 study released by the University of Maine showed that shikimic acid can also be readily harvested from the needles of several species of pine tree.

Protecting groups are more commonly used in small-scale laboratory work and initial development than in industrial production processes because their use adds additional steps and material costs to the process. However, the availability of a cheap chiral building block can overcome these additional costs, for example, shikimic acid for oseltamivir.

Aminoshikimic acid is also an alternative to shikimic acid as a starting material for the synthesis of oseltamivir.

== Target for drugs ==
Shikimate can be used to synthesise (6S)-6-fluoroshikimic acid, an antibiotic which inhibits the aromatic biosynthetic pathway. More specifically, glyphosate inhibits the enzyme 5-enolpyruvylshikimate-3-phosphate synthase (EPSPS). "Roundup Ready" genetically modified crops overcome that inhibition.

== Occurrence ==
It occurs in tree fern fronds, a specialty called fiddlehead (furled fronds of a young tree fern in the order Cyatheales, harvested for use as a vegetable). These fronds are edible, but can be roasted to remove shikimic acid.

Shikimic acid is also the glycoside part of some hydrolysable tannins. The acid is highly soluble in water and insoluble in nonpolar solvents, and this is why shikimic acid is active only against Gram-positive bacteria, due to outer cell membrane impermeability of Gram-negatives.

== See also ==
- Aminoshikimate pathway, a novel variation of the shikimate pathway
