= Cynarine =

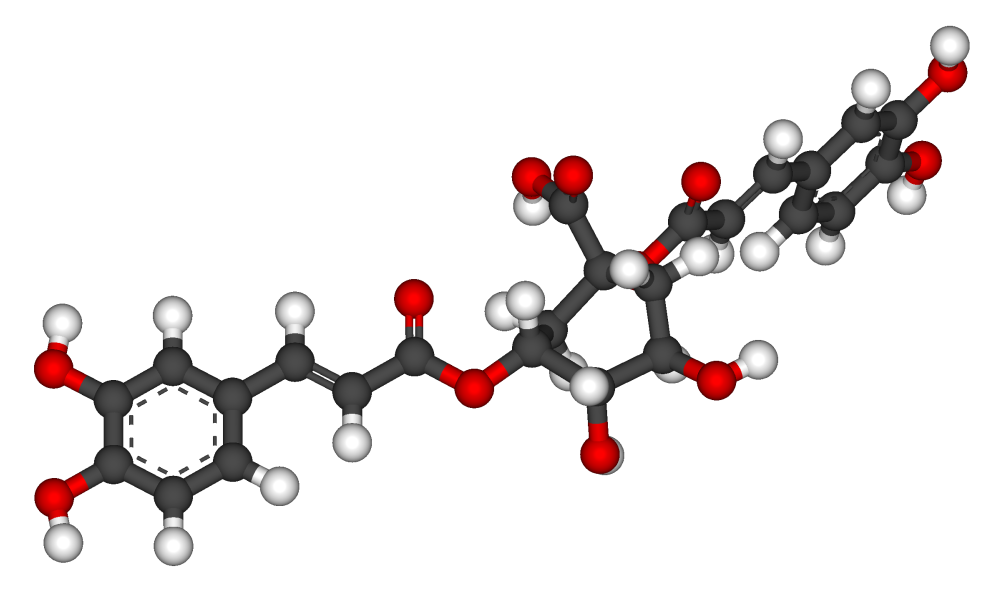

Names
- Preferred IUPAC name (1R,3R,4S,5R)-1,3-Bis{[(2E)-3-(3,4-dihydroxyphenyl)prop-2-enoyl]oxy}-4,5-dihydroxycyclohexane-1-carboxylic acid
- Other names 1,5-Dicaffeoylquinic acid; Cynarin; Cinarin; Cinarine

Identifiers
CAS Number	212891-05-9
3D model (JSmol)	Interactive image
ChEMBL	ChEMBL2105478
ChemSpider	4445082
PubChem CID	5281769
UNII	85D81U9JAV
CompTox Dashboard (EPA)	DTXSID301309674
- InChI: InChI=1S/C25H24O12/c26-15-5-1-13(9-17(15)28)3-7-21(31)36-20-12-25(24(34)35,11-19(30)23(20)33)37-22(32)8-4-14-2-6-16(27)18(29)10-14/h1-10,19-20,23,26-30,33H,11-12H2,(H,34,35)/b7-3+,8-4+/t19-,20-,23+,25-/m1/s1 Key: YDDUMTOHNYZQPO-RVXRWRFUSA-N; InChI=1/C25H24O12/c26-15-5-1-13(9-17(15)28)3-7-21(31)36-20-12-25(24(34)35,11-19(30)23(20)33)37-22(32)8-4-14-2-6-16(27)18(29)10-14/h1-10,19-20,23,26-30,33H,11-12H2,(H,34,35)/b7-3+,8-4+/t19-,20-,23+,25-/m1/s1 Key: YDDUMTOHNYZQPO-RVXRWRFUBT
- SMILES: C1[C@H]([C@@H]([C@@H](C[C@]1(C(=O)O)OC(=O)/C=C/C2=CC(=C(C=C2)O)O)OC(=O)/C=C/C3=CC(=C(C=C3)O)O)O)O

Properties
Chemical formula	C_{25}H_{24}O_{12}
Molar mass	516.455 g·mol^{−1}
- Except where otherwise noted, data are given for materials in their standard state (at 25 °C [77 °F], 100 kPa). verify (what is ?) Infobox references

Cynarine is a hydroxycinnamic acid derivative and a biologically active chemical constituent of artichoke (Cynara cardunculus).

Chemically, it is an ester formed from quinic acid and two units of caffeic acid.

== See also ==
- Chlorogenic acid
- Caffeoylquinic acid
