= 3-deoxy-8-phosphooctulonate synthase =

Enzyme

Identifiers
- EC no.: 2.5.1.55
- CAS no.: 9026-96-4

Databases
- IntEnz: IntEnz view
- BRENDA: BRENDA entry
- ExPASy: NiceZyme view
- KEGG: KEGG entry
- MetaCyc: metabolic pathway
- PRIAM: profile
- PDB structures: RCSB PDB PDBe PDBsum
- Gene Ontology: AmiGO / QuickGO
Search
- PMC: articles
- PubMed: articles
- NCBI: proteins

3-deoxy-8-phosphooctulonate synthase (EC 2.5.1.55) is an enzyme that catalyzes the chemical reaction

phosphoenolpyruvic acid
+
D-arabinose 5-phosphate
H_{2}O
P_{i}
3-deoxy-8-phosphooctulonic acid

The three substrates of this enzyme first characterised from Pseudomonas aeruginosa are phosphoenolpyruvate, D-arabinose 5-phosphate, and water. Its products are 3-deoxy-α-D-manno-2-octulosonic acid 8-phosphate (3-deoxy-8-phosphooctulonic acid) and orthophosphate (P_{i}). The enzyme isolated from Helicobacter pylori was shown to be a zinc-containing metalloprotein. Its crystal structure has been determined.

== Nomenclature ==
This enzyme is a transferase, specifically those transferring aryl or alkyl groups other than methyl groups. The systematic name of this enzyme class is phosphoenolpyruvate:D-arabinose-5-phosphate C-(1-carboxyvinyl)transferase (phosphate-hydrolysing, 2-carboxy-2-oxoethyl-forming). Other names in common use include 2-dehydro-3-deoxy-D-octonate-8-phosphate, D-arabinose-5-phosphate-lyase (pyruvate-phosphorylating), 2-dehydro-3-deoxy-phosphooctonate aldolase, 2-keto-3-deoxy-8-phosphooctonic synthetase, 3-deoxy-D-manno-octulosonate-8-phosphate synthase, 3-deoxy-D-mannooctulosonate-8-phosphate synthetase, 3-deoxyoctulosonic 8-phosphate synthetase, KDOP synthase, and phospho-2-keto-3-deoxyoctonate aldolase. It is part of the pathway to nucleotide sugars.
