= Pyrithiamine deaminase =

pyrithiamine deaminase

Identifiers
- EC no.: 3.5.4.20
- CAS no.: 37289-23-9

Databases
- IntEnz: IntEnz view
- BRENDA: BRENDA entry
- ExPASy: NiceZyme view
- KEGG: KEGG entry
- MetaCyc: metabolic pathway
- PRIAM: profile
- PDB structures: RCSB PDB PDBe PDBsum
- Gene Ontology: AmiGO / QuickGO
Search
- PMC: articles
- PubMed: articles
- NCBI: proteins

In enzymology, a pyrithiamine deaminase (EC 3.5.4.20) is an enzyme that catalyzes the chemical reaction

1-(4-amino-2-methylpyrimid-5-ylmethyl)-3-(beta-hydroxyethyl)-2- methylpyridinium bromide + H_{2}O $\rightleftharpoons$ 1-(4-hydroxy-2-methylpyrimid-5-ylmethyl)-3-(beta-hydroxyethyl)-2- methylpyridinium bromide + NH_{3}

The 3 substrates of this enzyme are 1-(4-amino-2-methylpyrimid-5-ylmethyl)-3-(beta-hydroxyethyl)-2-, methylpyridinium bromide, and H_{2}O, whereas its 3 products are 1-(4-hydroxy-2-methylpyrimid-5-ylmethyl)-3-(beta-hydroxyethyl)-2-, methylpyridinium bromide, and NH_{3}.

This enzyme belongs to the family of hydrolases, those acting on carbon-nitrogen bonds other than peptide bonds, specifically in cyclic amidines. The systematic name of this enzyme class is 1-(4-amino-2-methylpyrimid-5-ylmethyl)-3-(beta-hydroxyethyl)-2-methylpyridinium-bromide aminohydrolase.
