= Quinate dehydrogenase (quinone) =

Enzyme

Identifiers
- EC no.: 1.1.5.8
- CAS no.: 115299-99-5

Databases
- IntEnz: IntEnz view
- BRENDA: BRENDA entry
- ExPASy: NiceZyme view
- KEGG: KEGG entry
- MetaCyc: metabolic pathway
- PRIAM: profile
- PDB structures: RCSB PDB PDBe PDBsum
Search
- PMC: articles
- PubMed: articles
- NCBI: proteins

Quinate dehydrogenase (quinone) (EC 1.1.5.8, NAD(P)^{+}-independent quinate dehydrogenase, quinate:pyrroloquinoline-quinone 5-oxidoreductase) is an enzyme with systematic name quinate:quinol 3-oxidoreductase. This enzyme catalyses the following chemical reaction

quinic acid
+ a quinone
H^{+}
H^{+}
3-dehydroquinic acid
+ a quinol

This enzyme is membrane-bound.
