= DAHP =

DAHP may refer to:

- Washington State Department of Archaeology and Historic Preservation, an independent government agency in Washington state
- 3-deoxy-D-arabinoheptulosonate-7-phosphate, an intermediate in the biosynthesis of shikimic acid
