= Quinic acid =

Quinic acid
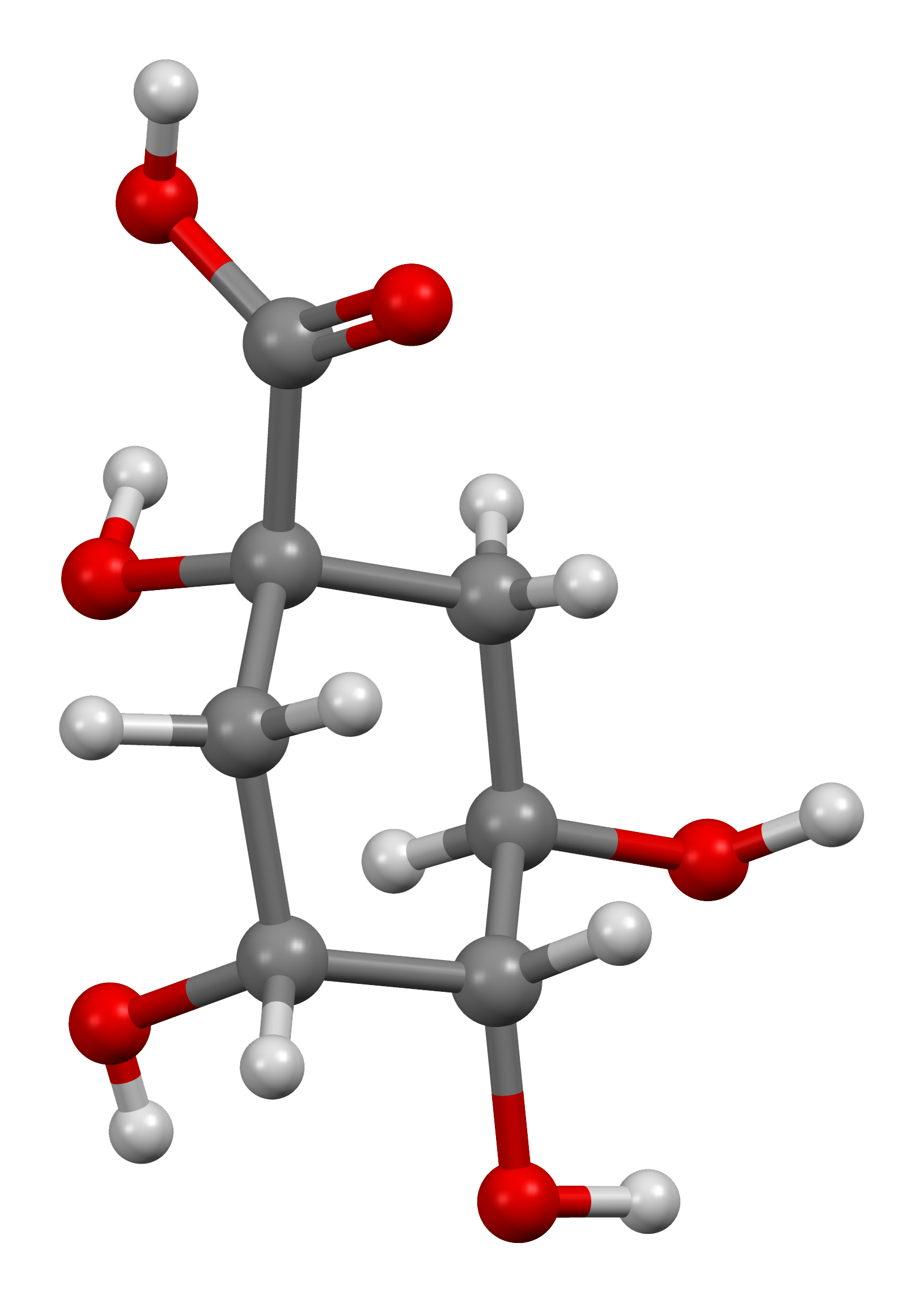
Quinic acid

Names
- IUPAC name 1ʟ-1(OH),3,4/5-Tetrahydroxycyclohexanecarboxylic acid
- Preferred IUPAC name (1S,3R,4S,5R)-1,3,4,5-Tetrahydroxycyclohexane-1-carboxylic acid

Identifiers
CAS Number	77-95-2
3D model (JSmol)	Interactive image
ChEBI	CHEBI:17521
ChEMBL	ChEMBL465398
ChemSpider	10246715
ECHA InfoCard	100.000.976
PubChem CID	6508
UNII	058C04BGYI
CompTox Dashboard (EPA)	DTXSID70998288
- InChI: InChI=1S/C7H12O6/c8-3-1-7(13,6(11)12)2-4(9)5(3)10/h3-5,8-10,13H,1-2H2,(H,11,12)/t3-,4-,5-,7+/m1/s1 Key: AAWZDTNXLSGCEK-WYWMIBKRSA-N; InChI=1/C7H12O6/c8-3-1-7(13,6(11)12)2-4(9)5(3)10/h3-5,8-10,13H,1-2H2,(H,11,12)/t3-,4-,5-,7+/m1/s1 Key: AAWZDTNXLSGCEK-WYWMIBKRBU
- SMILES: O[C@]1(C[C@@H](O)[C@@H](O)[C@H](O)C1)C(O)=O

Properties
Chemical formula	C_{7}H_{12}O_{6}
Molar mass	192.17 g/mol
Density	1.35 g/cm^{3}
Melting point	168 °C (334 °F; 441 K)

Hazards
- GHS labelling
Pictograms	(GHS07: Exclamation mark)
Signal word	Warning
Hazard statements	H319
Precautionary statements	P264, P280, P305+P351+P338, P337+P313
NFPA 704 (fire diamond)	0 0 0
- Except where otherwise noted, data are given for materials in their standard state (at 25 °C [77 °F], 100 kPa). verify (what is ?) Infobox references

Quinic acid is an organic compound with the formula (CHOH)_{3}(CH_{2})_{2}C(OH)CO_{2}H. The compound is classified as a cyclitol, a cyclic polyol, and a cyclohexanecarboxylic acid. It is a colorless solid that can be extracted from plant sources.

== Occurrence and preparation ==
Quinic acid is present in many plants as a caffeoylquinic acid, which are esters of quinic acid with caffeic acids. Esterified with one unit of caffeic acid it forms chlorogenic acid. Esterified with two units of caffeic acid, it forms cynarine.

It is found in Cinchona bark at high concentrations. It is also found in coffee beans and the bark of Eucalyptus globulus. It is a constituent of the tara tannins. Kiwifruit also have a high level of quinic acid (1–2% w/w) as a key component of their flavor. It can also be found in high quantities in the fruit of some accessions of Malus coronaria.

It is made synthetically by hydrolysis of chlorogenic acid.

== History and biosynthesis ==
Shikimic acid, biosynthetic precursor to aromatic amino acids, is a close relative of quinic acid.

This substance was isolated for the first time in 1790 by German pharmacist Friedrich Christian Hofmann in Leer from Cinchona. Its transformation into hippuric acid by animal metabolism was studied by German chemist Eduard Lautemann in 1863.

Its biosynthesis begins with the transformation of glucose into erythrose 4-phosphate. This four-carbon substrate is condensed with phosphoenol pyruvate to give the seven-carbon 3-deoxy-D-arabinoheptulosonate 7-phosphate (DAHP) by the action of a synthase. Two subsequent steps involving dehydroquinic acid synthase and a dehydrogenase afford the compound.

Derived bicyclic lactones are called quinides. One example is 4-caffeoyl-1,5-quinide.

Dehydrogenation and oxidation of quinic acid affords gallic acid.

== Applications and medicinal activity ==
This acid is a versatile chiral starting material for the synthesis of pharmaceuticals. It is a building block in the synthesis of oseltamivir, which is used to treat influenza A and B.
