= Erythrose-4-phosphate dehydrogenase =

Identifiers
- EC no.: 1.2.1.72

Databases
- IntEnz: IntEnz view
- BRENDA: BRENDA entry
- ExPASy: NiceZyme view
- KEGG: KEGG entry
- MetaCyc: metabolic pathway
- PRIAM: profile
- PDB structures: RCSB PDB PDBe PDBsum
Search
- PMC: articles
- PubMed: articles
- NCBI: proteins

In enzymology, erythrose-4-phosphate dehydrogenase (EC 1.2.1.72) is an enzyme that catalyzes the chemical reaction

erythrose 4-phosphate
+ NAD^{+}
H_{2}O
H^{+}
H_{2}O
H^{+}
4-phospho-D-erythronic acid
+ NADH

The three substrates of this enzyme are D-erythrose 4-phosphate, oxidised nicotinamide adenine dinucleotide (NAD^{+}), and water. Its products are 4-phospho-D-erythronic acid, reduced NADH, and a proton.

This enzyme belongs to the family of oxidoreductases, specifically those acting on the aldehyde or oxo group of donor with NAD+ or NADP+ as acceptor. The systematic name of this enzyme class is D-erythrose 4-phosphate:NAD+ oxidoreductase. Other names in common use include erythrose 4-phosphate dehydrogenase, E4PDH, GapB, Epd dehydrogenase, and E4P dehydrogenase. This enzyme participates in vitamin B_{6} metabolism (see DXP-dependent biosynthesis of pyridoxal phosphate).
