= Methylpyridinium =

Names
- Preferred IUPAC name 1-Methylpyridin-1-ium
- Other names N-Methylpyridinium

Identifiers
CAS Number	694-56-4
3D model (JSmol)	Interactive image
ChemSpider	13008
PubChem CID	13597
CompTox Dashboard (EPA)	DTXSID70989212
- InChI: InChI=1S/C6H8N/c1-7-5-3-2-4-6-7/h2-6H,1H3/q+1 Key: PQBAWAQIRZIWIV-UHFFFAOYSA-N; InChI=1/C6H8N/c1-7-5-3-2-4-6-7/h2-6H,1H3/q+1 Key: PQBAWAQIRZIWIV-UHFFFAOYAW
- SMILES: [n+]1(ccccc1)C

Properties
Chemical formula	C_{6}H_{8}N^{+}
Molar mass	94.134 g/mol
- Except where otherwise noted, data are given for materials in their standard state (at 25 °C [77 °F], 100 kPa). Infobox references

Methylpyridinium is an ion with the formula C_{5}H_{5}NCH^{+}_{3}. It is the N-methylated derivative of pyridine. It confers no color to its salts. The ion is classified as a quaternary ammonium ion.

== Preparation and occurrence ==
Methylpyridinium is prepared by treating pyridine with dimethylsulfate:

C_{5}H_{5}N + (CH_{3}O)_{2}SO_{2} → [C_{5}H_{5}NCH_{3}]^{+}CH_{3}OSO^{−}_{3}

It is found in some coffee products as a result of the thermal decarboxylation of trigonelline.

== Ionic liquid ==
The chloride salt of N-methylpyridinium behaves as an ionic liquid. Mixtures of that salt and zinc chloride have been characterised over the temperature range 150–200 °C (423–473 K).

== See also ==
- Pyridinium
- 4-Caffeoyl-1,5-quinide
