= Aminoshikimate pathway =

The Aminoshikimate pathway is a biochemical pathway present in some plants, which has been studied by biologists, biochemists and especially those interested in manufacture of novel antibiotic drugs. The pathway is a novel variation of the shikimate pathway. The aminoshikimate pathway was first discovered and studied in the rifamycin B producer Amycolatopsis mediterranei. Its end product, 3-amino-5-hydroxybenzoate, serves as an initiator for polyketide synthases in the biosynthesis of ansamycins.

== Overview ==
Floss and coworkers identified the gene cluster associated with the aminoshikimate pathway in Amycolatopsis mediterranei. The enzyme-catalyzed condensation of 1-deoxy-1-imino-D-erythrose 4-phosphate with phosphoenolpyruvate to form 4-amino-3,4-dideoxy-d-arabino-heptulosonic acid 7-phosphate has been proposed to be the first committed step in the aminoshikimate pathway. Guo and Frost demonstrated that the unusual metabolite, 1-deoxy-1-imino-D-erythrose 4-phosphate, is derived from 3-amino-3-deoxy-D-fructose 6-phosphate. In addition, kanosamine biosynthesis has been directly implicated by Guo and Frost as the source of the aminoshikimate pathway's nitrogen atom.

== Uses ==
Aminoshikimate pathway has been assembled in E. coli to synthesize aminoshikimic acid, which is a promising starting material for the synthesis of anti-influenza agent oseltamivir (brand name Tamiflu).
