= Neochlorogenic acid =

Names
- Preferred IUPAC name (1R,3R,4S,5R)-3-{[(2E)-3-(3,4-Dihydroxyphenyl)prop-2-enoyl]oxy}-1,4,5-trihydroxycyclohexane-1-carboxylic acid
- Other names 5-O-Caffeoylquinic acid 3-O-Caffeoylquinic acid

Identifiers
CAS Number	906-33-2
3D model (JSmol)	Interactive image
ChEBI	CHEBI:16384
ChEMBL	ChEMBL249450
ChemSpider	4444237
ECHA InfoCard	100.011.816
PubChem CID	5280633
UNII	O4601UER1Z
CompTox Dashboard (EPA)	DTXSID301347903
- InChI: InChI=1S/C16H18O9/c17-9-3-1-8(5-10(9)18)2-4-13(20)25-12-7-16(24,15(22)23)6-11(19)14(12)21/h1-5,11-12,14,17-19,21,24H,6-7H2,(H,22,23)/b4-2+/t11-,12-,14+,16-/m1/s1 Key: CWVRJTMFETXNAD-NXLLHMKUSA-N; InChI=1/C16H18O9/c17-9-3-1-8(5-10(9)18)2-4-13(20)25-12-7-16(24,15(22)23)6-11(19)14(12)21/h1-5,11-12,14,17-19,21,24H,6-7H2,(H,22,23)/b4-2+/t11-,12-,14+,16-/m1/s1 Key: CWVRJTMFETXNAD-NXLLHMKUBY
- SMILES: O=C(O)[C@@]2(O)C[C@@H](O)[C@H](O)[C@H](OC(=O)\C=C\c1ccc(O)c(O)c1)C2

Properties
Chemical formula	C_{16}H_{18}O_{9}
Molar mass	354.311 g·mol^{−1}
- Except where otherwise noted, data are given for materials in their standard state (at 25 °C [77 °F], 100 kPa). verify (what is ?) Infobox references

Neochlorogenic acid is a natural polyphenol found in some dried fruits and other plant sources, such as peaches. It is an isomer of chlorogenic acid; both of these are members of the caffeoylquinic acid class of molecules.

Urtica dioica, the European stinging nettle, is another common source.
