= (6S)-6-Fluoroshikimic acid =

- Chemical structure of (6S)-6-fluoroshikimic acid

Names
- Preferred IUPAC name (3R,4R,5S,6S)-6-Fluoro-3,4,5-trihydroxycyclohex-1-ene-1-carboxylic acid

Identifiers
CAS Number	133398-72-8
3D model (JSmol)	Interactive image
ChemSpider	8395259
PubChem CID	10219767
UNII	48P26AK8X8
CompTox Dashboard (EPA)	DTXSID101028206
- InChI: InChI=1S/C7H9FO5/c8-4-2(7(12)13)1-3(9)5(10)6(4)11/h1,3-6,9-11H,(H,12,13)/t3-,4+,5-,6-/m1/s1 Key: XFSMSJCDVCOESF-JGWLITMVSA-N; InChI=1/C7H9FO5/c8-4-2(7(12)13)1-3(9)5(10)6(4)11/h1,3-6,9-11H,(H,12,13)/t3-,4+,5-,6-/m1/s1 Key: XFSMSJCDVCOESF-JGWLITMVBO
- SMILES: F[C@H]1C(=C/[C@@H](O)[C@@H](O)[C@@H]1O)\C(=O)O

Properties
Chemical formula	C_{7}H_{9}FO_{5}
Molar mass	192.14 g/mol
- Except where otherwise noted, data are given for materials in their standard state (at 25 °C [77 °F], 100 kPa). Infobox references

(6S)-6-Fluoroshikimic acid is an antibacterial agent acting on the aromatic biosynthetic pathway. It may be used against Plasmodium falciparum, the causative agent of malaria. The molecule is targeting the enzymes of the shikimate pathway. This metabolic pathway is not present in mammals. The mechanism of action of the molecule is not through the inhibition of chorismate synthase but by the inhibition of 4-aminobenzoic acid synthesis.

The use of the molecule led to resistances in Escherichia coli.

== See also ==
- Shikimic acid
