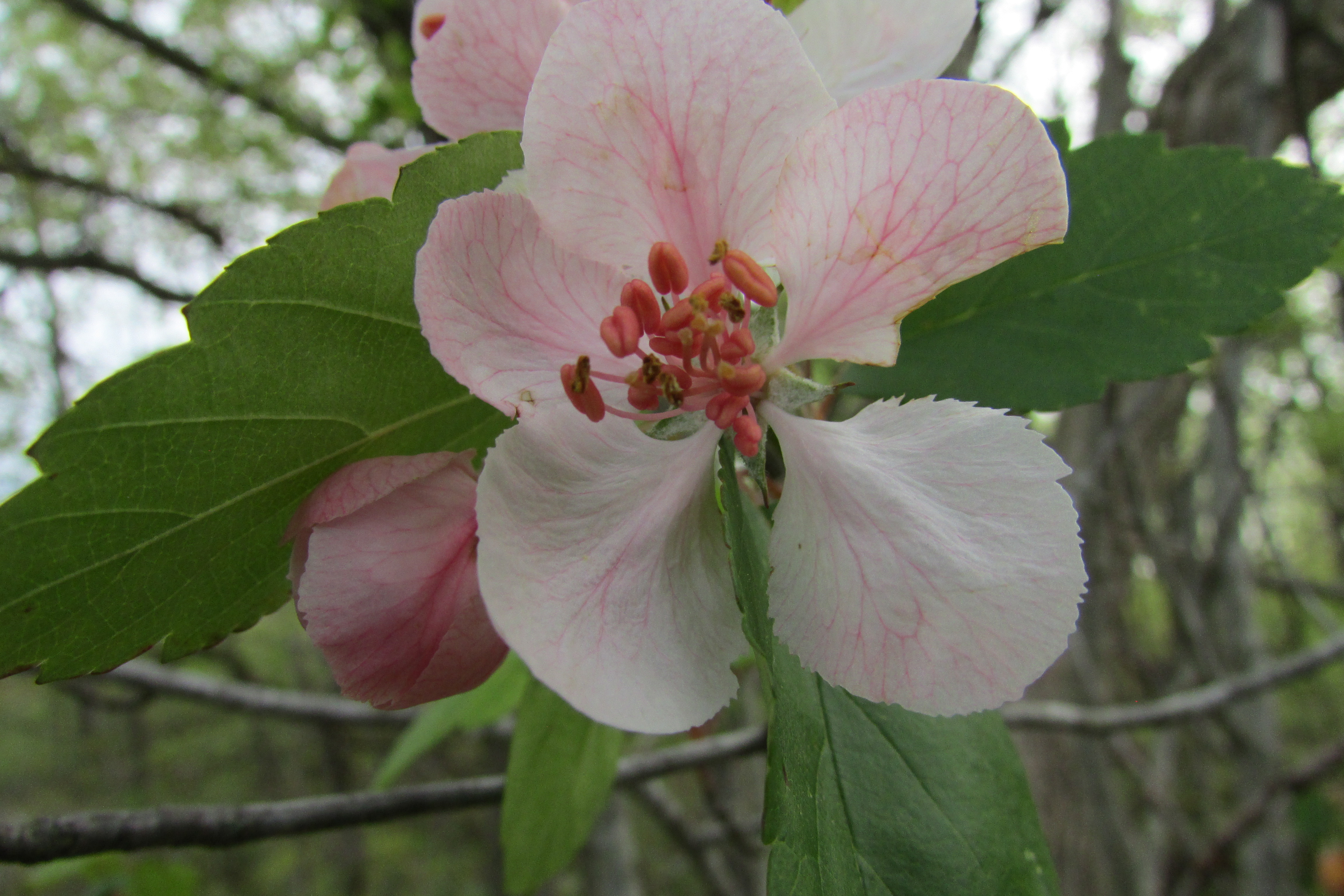
- The flowers of Malus coronaria.

Conservation status
- Least Concern (IUCN 3.1)

Scientific classification
- Kingdom: Plantae
- Clade: Tracheophytes
- Clade: Angiosperms
- Clade: Eudicots
- Clade: Rosids
- Order: Rosales
- Family: Rosaceae
- Genus: Malus
- Species: M. coronaria

Binomial name
- Malus coronaria (L.) Mill.
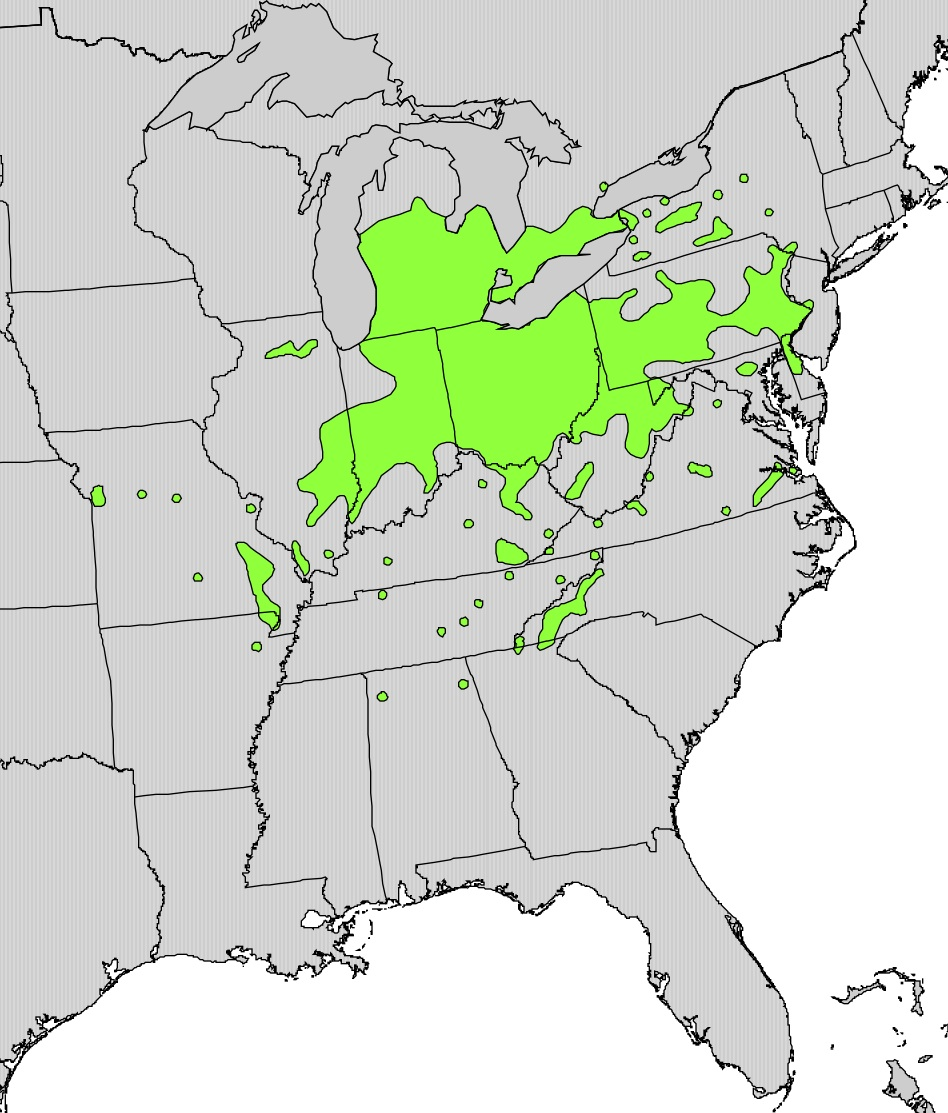
- Natural range

Synonyms
- Malus angustifolia var. puberula (Rehder) Rehder; M. bracteata Rehder; M. carolinensis Ashe; M. elongata (Rehder) Ashe; M. fragrans Rehder; M. glabrata Rehder; M. glaucescens Rehder; M. lancifolia Rehder; M. platycarpa Rehder; Pyrus bracteata (Rehder) L. H. Bailey; P. coronaria L.

= Malus coronaria =

Species of tree

Malus coronaria, also known by the names sweet crabapple or garland crab, is a North American species of Malus (crabapple).

== Description ==
Malus coronaria often is a bushy shrub with rigid, contorted branches, but frequently becomes a small tree up to 10 metres (33 feet) tall, with a broad open crown. Its flowering time is about two weeks later than that of the domestic apple, and its fragrant fruit clings to the branches on clustered stems long after the leaves have fallen.

The bark is reddish brown, longitudinally fissured, with surface separating in narrow scales. Branchlets at first coated with thick white wool, later they become smooth reddish brown; they develop in their second year long, spur-like branches and sometimes absolute thorns 2.5 centimetres (1 inch) or more in length.

The wood is reddish brown, the sapwood yellow; it is heavy, close-grained, not strong. Used for the handles of tools and small domestic articles. It has a specific gravity of 0.7048; and density 703.5 kilograms per cubic metre (43.92 pounds per cubic foot).

Its winter buds are bright red, obtuse, minute. Inner scales grow with the growing shoot, become 15 millimetres (1/2 in) long and bright red before they fall.

Its leaves alternate, and are simple, ovate, 7.5–10 cm (3–4 in) long, 4–5 cm (1 1/2–2 in) broad, obtuse, subcordate or acute at base, incisely serrate, often three-lobed on vigorous shoots, acute at apex. Feather-veined, midrib and primary veins grooved above, prominent beneath. They come out of the bud involute, red bronze, tomentose and downy; when full grown are bright dark green above, paler beneath. In autumn, they turn yellow. Petioles slender, long, often with two dark glands near the middle. Stipules filiform, 15 mm (1/2 in) long, early deciduous.

The flowers bloom from May to June, when leaves are nearly grown. Perfect, rose-colored, fragrant, 4–5 cm (1 1/2–2 in) across. They are borne in five or six-flowered umbels on slender pedicels. The calyx is urn-shaped, downy or tomentose, five-lobed; lobes slender, acute, persistent, imbricate in bud. The corolla has five petals, is rose colored, ob ovate, rounded above, with long narrow claws, undulate or crenelate at margin, inserted on the calyx tube, imbricate in bud. There are 10–20 stamens, inserted on the calyx tube, shorter than the petals; filaments by a partial twist forming a tube narrowed in the middle and enlarged above; anthers introrse, two-celled; cells opening longitudinally. The pistil consists of five carpels inserted in the bottom of the calyx tube and united into an inferior ovary; styles five; stigma capitate; ovules two in each cell.

The fruit is a pome or apple ripening in October. Depressed-globular, 2.5–4 cm (1–1 1/2 in) in diameter, crowned with calyx lobes and remnant of filaments; yellow green, delightfully fragrant, surface sometimes waxy. Flesh white, delicate and charged with malic acid. Seeds two or, by abortion, one in each cell, chestnut brown shining; cotyledons fleshy.

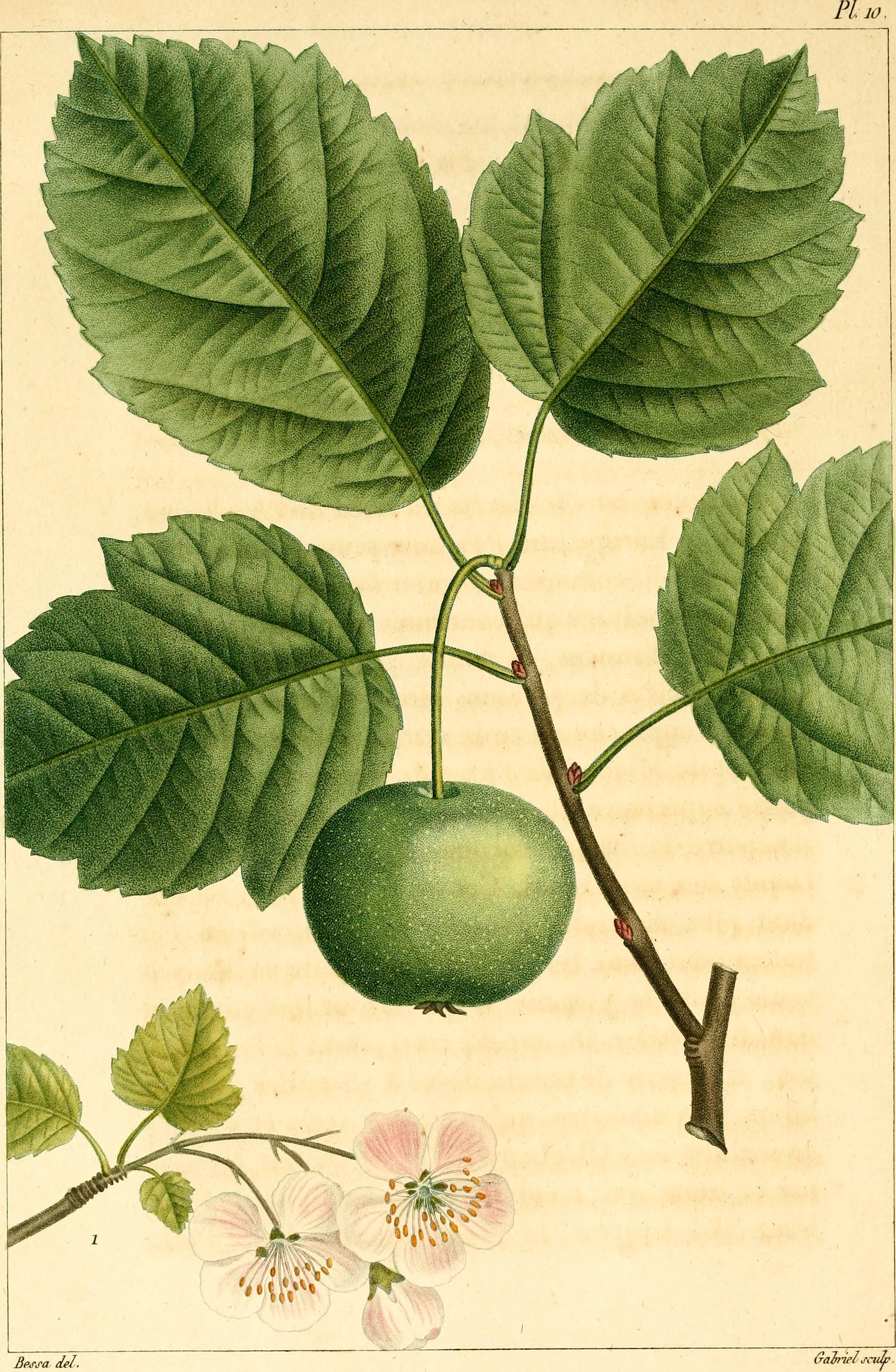
Illustration

=== Chemistry ===
Quinic acid can also be found in high quantities in the fruit of some accessions of Malus coronaria.

== Taxonomy ==
Two varieties are known:

- Malus coronaria var. coronaria
- Malus coronaria var. dasycalyx

== Distribution and habitat ==
The species grows primarily in the Great Lakes Region and in the Ohio Valley, with outlying populations as far away as Alabama, eastern Kansas, and Long Island. It prefers rich moist soil.

== Uses ==
The fruit is made into both preserves and cider. Pehr Kalm, a disciple of 18-century botanist Carl Linnaeus, wrote of the fruit:

The apples, or crabs, are small, sour and unfit for anything but to make vinegar of. They lie under the trees all winter and acquire a yellow color. They seldom begin to rot before spring comes on.
