= 3-Dehydroshikimic acid =

Names
- Preferred IUPAC name (4S,5R)-4,5-Dihydroxy-3-oxocyclohex-1-ene-1-carboxylic acid
- Other names 3-Dehydroshikimate; 3-DHS (−)-3-DHS

Identifiers
CAS Number	2922-42-1
3D model (JSmol)	Interactive image
ChEBI	CHEBI:30918
ChemSpider	388830
ECHA InfoCard	100.162.474
PubChem CID	439774
- InChI: InChI=1S/C7H8O5/c8-4-1-3(7(11)12)2-5(9)6(4)10/h1,5-6,9-10H,2H2,(H,11,12)/t5-,6-/m1/s1 Key: SLWWJZMPHJJOPH-PHDIDXHHSA-N; InChI=1/C7H8O5/c8-4-1-3(7(11)12)2-5(9)6(4)10/h1,5-6,9-10H,2H2,(H,11,12)/t5-,6-/m1/s1 Key: SLWWJZMPHJJOPH-PHDIDXHHBW
- SMILES: C1[C@H]([C@@H](C(=O)C=C1C(=O)O)O)O

Properties
Chemical formula	C_{7}H_{8}O_{5}
Molar mass	172.136 g·mol^{−1}
- Except where otherwise noted, data are given for materials in their standard state (at 25 °C [77 °F], 100 kPa). Infobox references

3-Dehydroshikimic acid is a chemical compound related to shikimic acid. 3-DHS is available in large quantity through engineering of the shikimic acid pathway.

== Metabolism ==
Biosynthesis: The enzyme 3-dehydroquinate dehydratase uses 3-dehydroquinate to produce 3-dehydroshikimate and H_{2}O.

3-Dehydroshikimate is then reduced to shikimic acid by the enzyme shikimate dehydrogenase, which uses nicotinamide adenine dinucleotide phosphate (NADPH) as a cofactor.

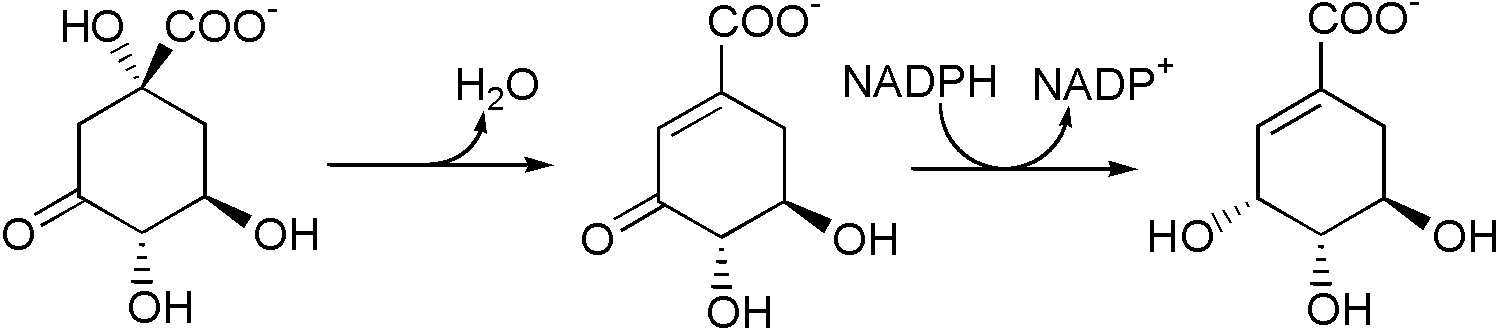
Biosynthesis of shikimic acid from 3-dehydroquinate

Gallic acid is also formed from 3-dehydroshikimate by the action of the enzyme shikimate dehydrogenase to produce 3,5-didehydroshikimate. This latter compound spontaneously rearranges to gallic acid.
