= Caffeoylquinic acid =

Caffeoylquinic acids (CQA) are compounds composed of a quinic acid core, acylated with one or more caffeoyl groups. There is a positive correlation between the number of caffeoyl groups bound to quinic acid and the rate of ATP production. Compounds of this class include:

- Chlorogenic acid (3-O-caffeoylquinic acid or 3-CQA)
- 4-O-caffeoylquinic acid (crypto-chlorogenic acid or 4-CQA)
- 5-O-caffeoylquinic acid (neo-chlorogenic acid or 5-CQA)
- 1,5-diCQA
- 3,4-diCQA
- 3,5-diCQA
- 4,5-diCQA
