= 4-Caffeoyl-1,5-quinide =

Names
- Preferred IUPAC name (1S,3R,4R,5R)-1,3-Dihydroxy-7-oxo-6-oxabicyclo[3.2.1]octan-4-yl (2E)-3-(3,4-dihydroxyphenyl)prop-2-enoate
- Other names 4-Caffeoylquinic-1,5-lactone; 4-CQL

Identifiers
CAS Number	1188414-37-0
3D model (JSmol)	Interactive image
ChEBI	CHEBI:175265
ChemSpider	30776763
PubChem CID	102210471
- InChI: InChI=1S/C16H16O8/c17-9-3-1-8(5-10(9)18)2-4-13(20)24-14-11(19)6-16(22)7-12(14)23-15(16)21/h1-5,11-12,14,17-19,22H,6-7H2/b4-2+/t11-,12-,14-,16+/m1/s1 Key: BMSNCTFPYHTXGU-JUHZACGLSA-N
- SMILES: c1cc(c(cc1/C=C/C(=O)O[C@@H]2[C@@H](C[C@@]3(C[C@H]2OC3=O)O)O)O)O

Properties
Chemical formula	C_{16}H_{16}O_{8}
Molar mass	336.296 g·mol^{−1}
- Except where otherwise noted, data are given for materials in their standard state (at 25 °C [77 °F], 100 kPa). Infobox references

4-Caffeoyl-1,5-quinide (4-caffeoylquinic-1,5-lactone or 4-CQL) is found in roasted coffee beans. It is formed by lactonization of 4-O-caffeoylquinic acid during the roasting process.

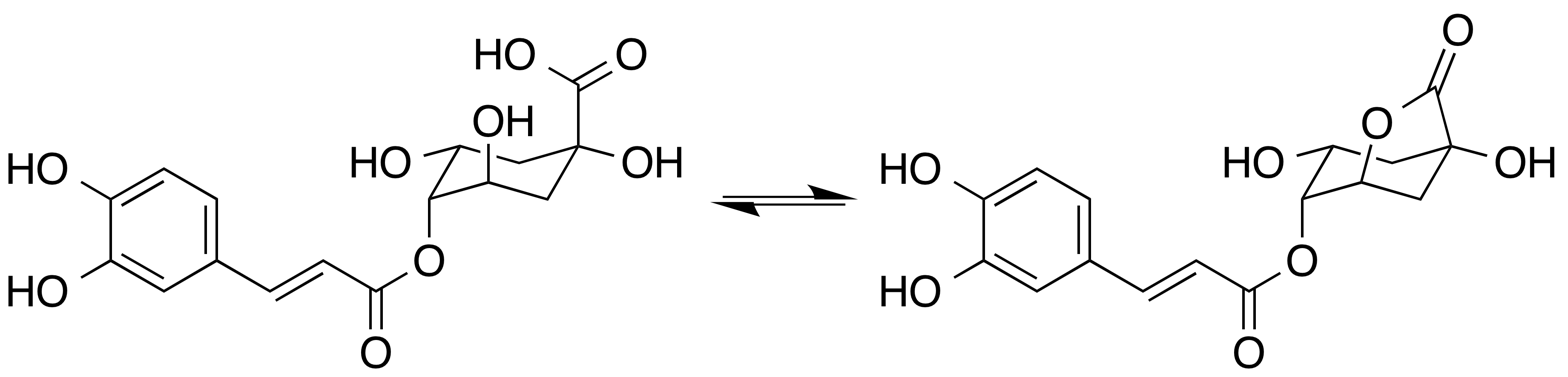
Lactonization of 4-O-caffeoylquinic acid during roasting to form of 4-CQL

It is reported to possess opioid antagonist properties in mice.
