= Aguadilla City Police Department =

Main police force of Aguadilla, Puerto Rico

Polícia Municipal de Aguadilla Aguadilla City Police Department
- Abbreviation: ACPD
- Motto: Seguridad, Servicio y Orgullo; Security, Service and Pride

Agency overview
- Formed: 1981

Jurisdictional structure
- Operations jurisdiction: Aguadilla, Puerto Rico
- Map of Polícia Municipal de Aguadilla's jurisdiction
- Area: 76.3 sq mi (197.7 km2)
- Population: 64,685
- Legal jurisdiction: Aguadilla, Puerto Rico
- General nature: Local civilian police

Operational structure
- Headquarters: Edificio Plaza Marina, Aguadilla, Puerto Rico
- Police Officers: 50
- Agency executive: Luis Irizarry Rosa, Police Commissioner
- Supervisions: List: Highway Patrol; Community Relations; Motorcycle Unit; Maritime Unit; Cycle Patrol Unit; Surveillance Unit; Tactical Unit

Facilities
- Lockups: Jail Cell with toilet
- Police Cars: Ford Crown Victoria; Ford Mustang; Chevrolet Trailblazer; Chevrolet Impala; Honda Motorcycles; Suzuki motorcycles
- Boats: ANGLER 31' with 2 Yamaha 200hp Outboard
- K9s: Labrador, German Shepherd

Website
- policia.pr.gov

The Aguadilla City Police Department (A.C.P.D.) (Spanish: Policia Municipal de Aguadilla) are the local police force in the town of Aguadilla, Puerto Rico. It was created under law #19 of May 12, 1977, known as Ley de la Policia Municipal (Municipal Police Law) creating the local police forces in each city of Puerto Rico. The A.C.P.D. only have jurisdiction in the municipality of Aguadilla and provide service and protection to local citizens and travelers alike in collaboration with the Puerto Rico Police, who have full jurisdiction.

The majority of the force is bilingual and can communicate with foreigners. Although limited to its jurisdiction, the A.C.P.D. works in collaboration with other local, state, and federal agencies including Border Patrol, the Emergency Management Office, State Police, Fire Department, FEMA, D.E.A., F.B.I., and A.T.F. The A.C.P.D is directed by a Commissioner appointed by the Mayor of Aguadilla and consists of Lieutenants, Sergeants, Police Officers, Cadets and civilian personnel that handle secretarial and maintenance duties. There are several divisions in the A.C.P.D., including the "Transit Division", which covers all the major highways; the "Tactical Division" that carries out special operations such as acting on search warrants and arrest warrants; the "Marine Division", which patrols the local beaches and up to nine nautical miles off the coast of Aguadilla with jet-skis, patrol boats, and ATVS to prevent the introduction of narcotics and illegal immigrants; the "Motorcycle Division", which covers all other areas together with patrol cars; the "Bicycle Division", who are assigned near the main Plaza; and the "Community Service Division", which works to develop a better relationship between the police and community by coordinating projects and activities.

== Photo gallery ==
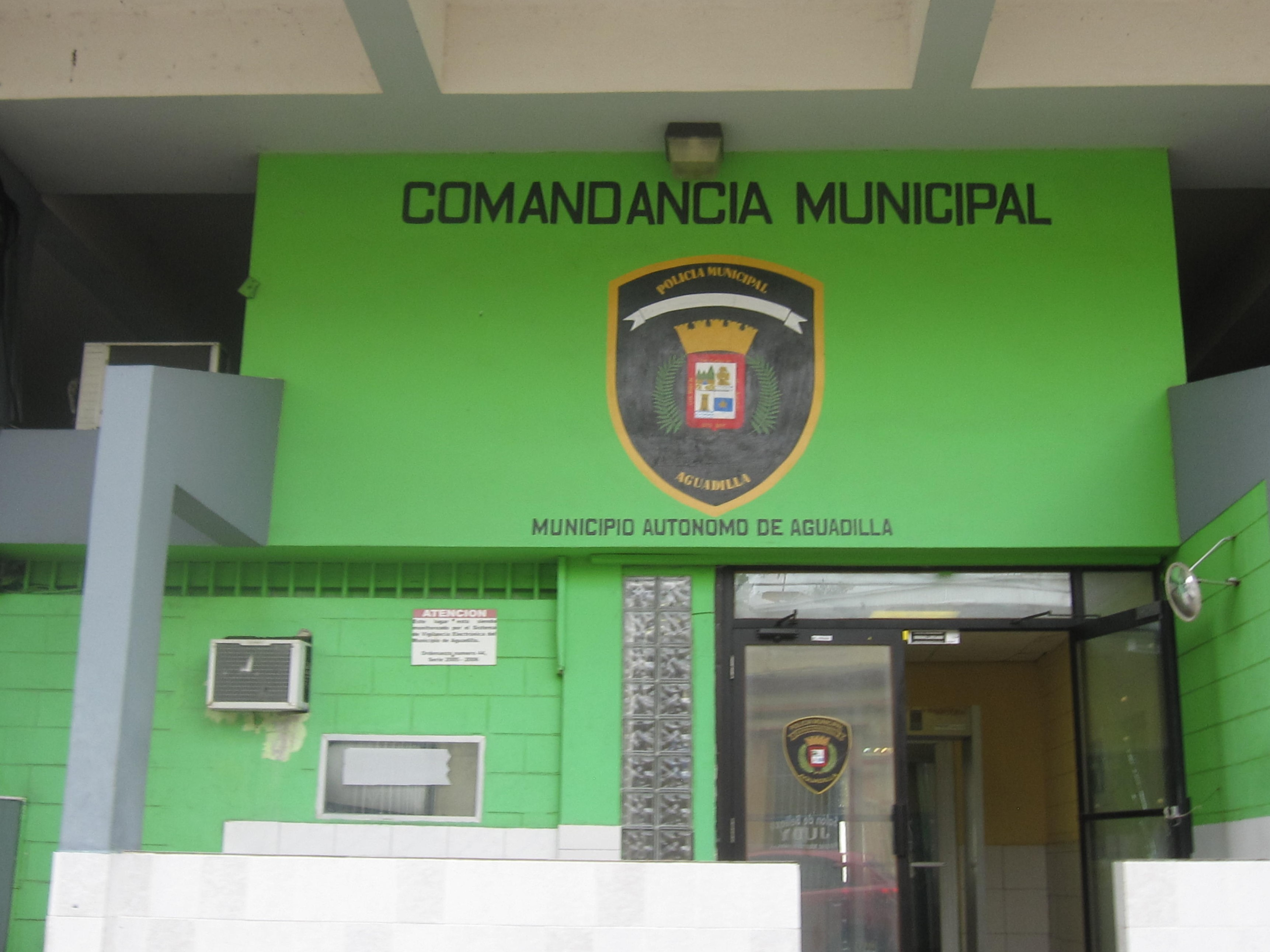
Police station in Aguadilla

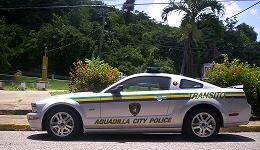
Mustang Highway Patrol

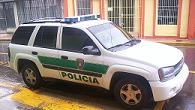
Police SUV

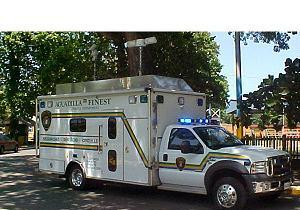
Mobile Command Center

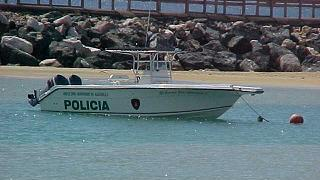
Marine Patrol Boat

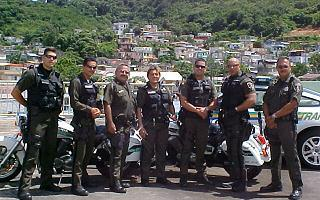
Officers in Uniform

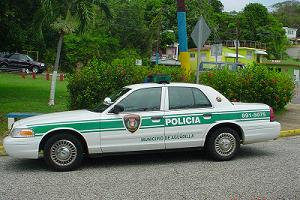
Police interceptor
