= Shikimate dehydrogenase =

Enzyme involved in amino acid biosynthesis

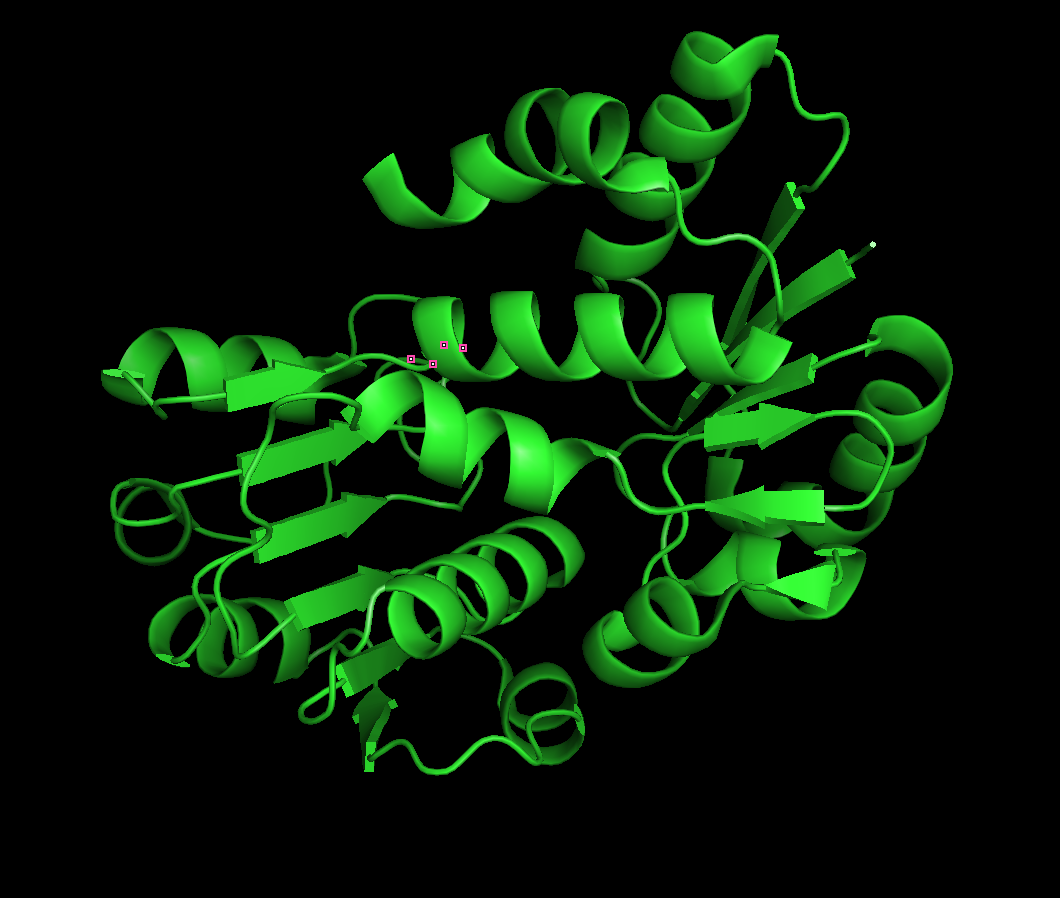

Identifiers
- EC no.: 1.1.1.25
- CAS no.: 9026-87-3

Databases
- BRENDA: enzyme data
- ExPASy: NiceZyme view
- KEGG: enzyme entry
- MetaCyc: metabolic pathway
- Rhea: reactions
- PDB structures: RCSB PDB PDBe PDBsum
- Gene Ontology: AmiGO / QuickGO
Search
- PMC: articles
- PubMed: articles
- NCBI: proteins

Shikimate dehydrogenases (EC 1.1.1.25) are a type of enzyme found in bacteria, fungi, plants, and archaea that catalyze the chemical reaction

shikimic acid
+ NADP^{+}
H^{+}
H^{+}
3-dehydroshikimic acid
+ NADPH

The two substrates of this enzyme are shikimate and oxidised nicotinamide adenine dinucleotide phosphate (NADP^{+}). Its products are 3-dehydroshikimate, reduced NADPH, and a proton. This enzyme participates in phenylalanine, tyrosine and tryptophan biosynthesis.

== Function ==
Shikimate dehydrogenase is an enzyme that catalyzes one step of the shikimate pathway. This pathway is found in bacteria, plants, fungi, algae, and parasites and is responsible for the biosynthesis of aromatic amino acids (phenylalanine, tyrosine, and tryptophan) from the metabolism of carbohydrates. In contrast, animals and humans lack this pathway hence products of this biosynthetic route are essential amino acids that must be obtained through an animal's diet.

There are seven enzymes that play a role in this pathway. Shikimate dehydrogenase (also known as 3-dehydroshikimate dehydrogenase) is the fourth step of the seven step process. This step converts 3-dehydroshikimate to shikimate as well as reduces NADP^{+} to NADPH.

== Nomenclature ==
This enzyme belongs to the family of oxidoreductases, specifically those acting on the CH-OH group of donor with NAD^{+} or NADP^{+} as acceptor. The systematic name of this enzyme class is shikimate:NADP^{+} 3-oxidoreductase. Other names in common use include:

- dehydroshikimic reductase,
- shikimate oxidoreductase,
- shikimate:NADP^{+} oxidoreductase,
- 5-dehydroshikimate reductase,
- shikimate 5-dehydrogenase,
- 5-dehydroshikimic reductase,
- DHS reductase,
- shikimate:NADP^{+} 5-oxidoreductase, and
- AroE.

== Reaction ==
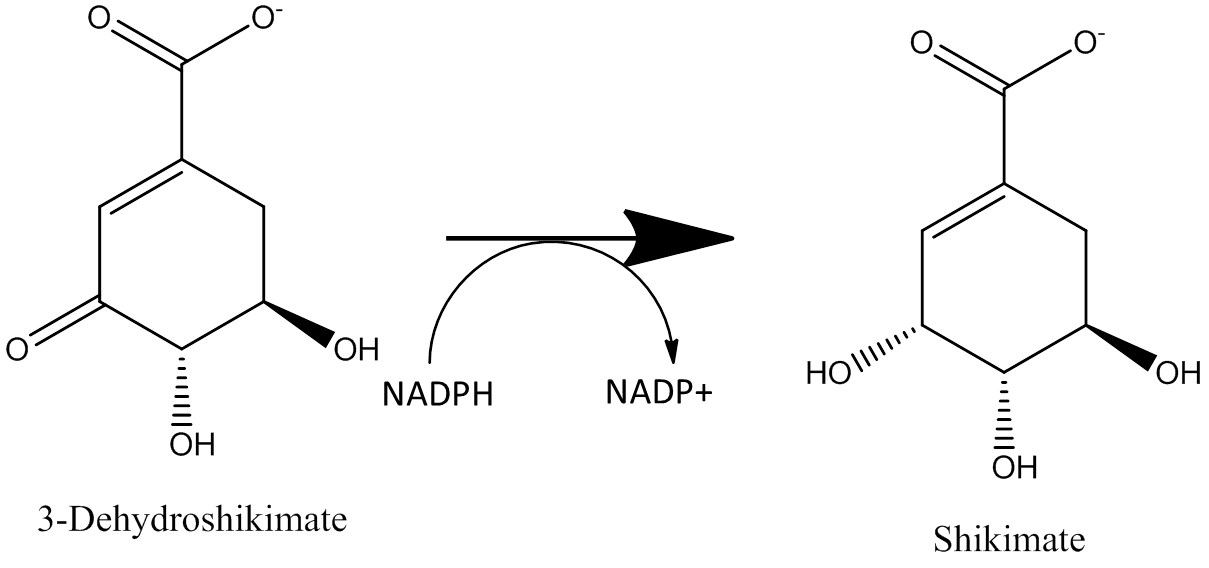
The Shikimate Dehydrogenase Reaction

Shikimate Dehydrogenase catalyzes the reversible NADPH-dependent reaction of 3-dehydroshikimate to shikimate. The enzyme reduces the carbon-oxygen double bond of a carbonyl functional group to a hydroxyl (OH) group, producing the shikimate anion. The reaction is NADPH dependent with NADPH being oxidised to NADP^{+}.

== Structure ==
=== N terminal domain ===
Shikimate dehydrogenase, N terminal domain
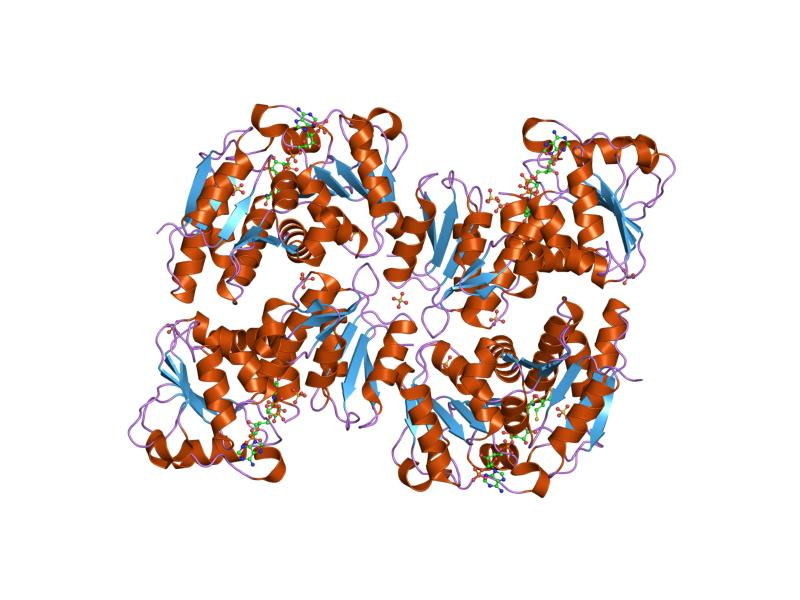
- Shikimate dehydrogenase AroE complexed with NADP^{+}

Identifiers
- Symbol: Shikimate_dh_N
- Pfam: PF08501
- InterPro: IPR013708
- SCOP2: 1vi2 / SCOPe / SUPFAM
Available protein structures:
- PDB: IPR013708 PF08501 (ECOD; PDBsum)
- AlphaFold: IPR013708; PF08501

The Shikimate dehydrogenase substrate binding domain found at the N-terminus binds to the substrate, 3-dehydroshikimate. It is considered to be the catalytic domain. It has a structure of six beta strands forming a twisted beta sheet with four alpha helices.

=== C terminal domain ===
Shikimate Dehydrogenase C terminal
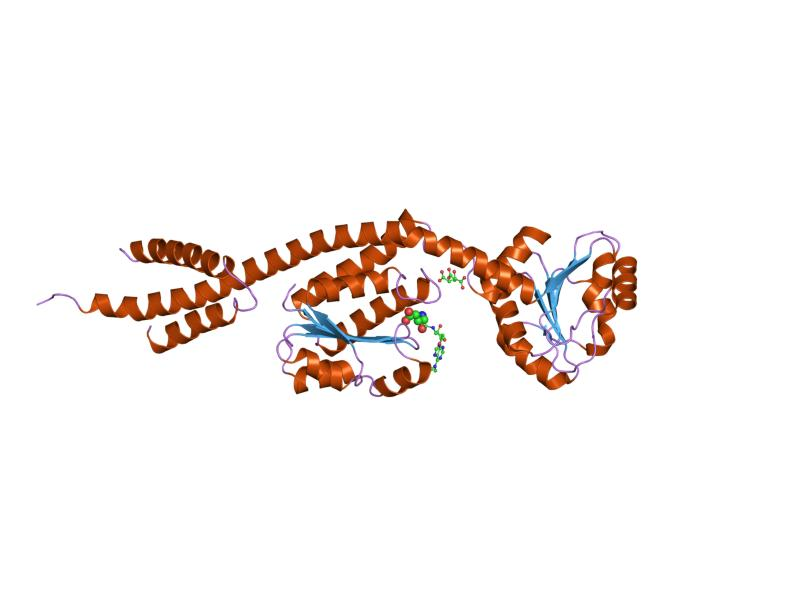
- Glutamyl-tRNA reductase from methanopyrus kandleri

Identifiers
- Symbol: Shikimate_DH
- Pfam: PF01488
- Pfam clan: CL0063
- InterPro: IPR006151
- SCOP2: 1nyt / SCOPe / SUPFAM
Available protein structures:
- PDB: IPR006151 PF01488 (ECOD; PDBsum)
- AlphaFold: IPR006151; PF01488

The C-terminal domain binds to NADPH. It has a special structure, a Rossmann fold, whereby six-stranded twisted and parallel beta sheet with loops and alpha helices surrounding the core beta sheet.

The Structure of Shikimate dehydrogenase is characterized by two domains, two alpha helices and two beta sheets with a large cleft separating the domains of the monomer. The enzyme is symmetrical. Shikimate dehydrogenase also has an NADPH binding site that contains a Rossmann fold. This binding site normally contains a glycine P-loop. The domains of the monomer show a fair amount of flexibility suggesting that the enzyme can open in close to bind with the substrate 3-Dehydroshikimate. Hydrophobic interactions occur between the domains and the NADPH binding site. This hydrophobic core and its interactions lock the shape of the enzyme even though the enzyme is a dynamic structure. There is also evidence to support that the structure of the enzyme is conserved, meaning the structure takes sharp turns in order to take up less space.

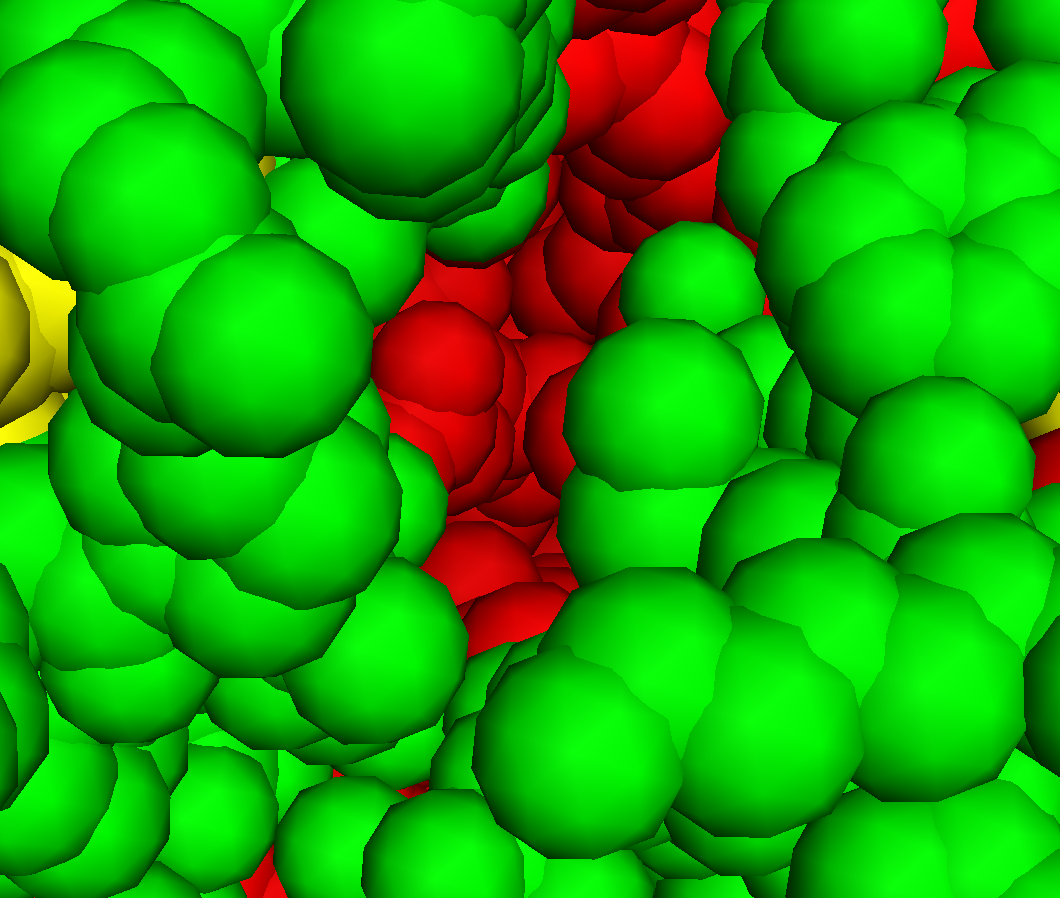
The cleft in the shikimate dehydrogenase monomer. The green selection is the loops surrounding the cleft, and the red selection shows alpha helices in the background.

== Paralogs ==
Escherichia coli (E. coli) expresses two different forms of shikimate dehydrogenase, AroE and YdiB. These two forms are paralogs of each other. The two forms of shikimate dehydrogenase have different primary sequences in different organisms but catalyze the same reactions. There is about 25% similarity between the sequences of AroE and YdiB, but their two structures have similar structures with similar folds. YdiB can utilize NAD or NADP as a cofactor and also reacts with quinic acid. They both have high affinity of their ligands as shown by their similar enzyme (K_{m}) values. Both forms of the enzyme are independently regulated.

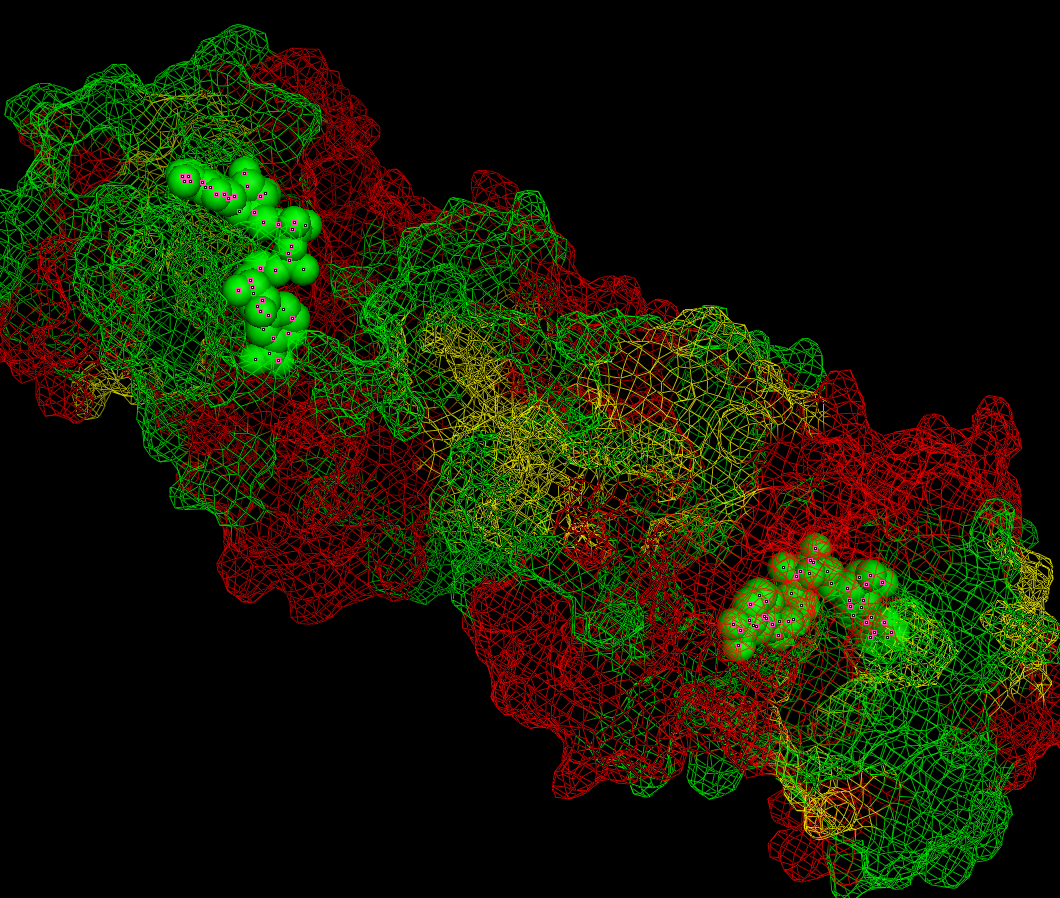
Shikimate dehydrogenase YdiB with highlighted NADH binding sites. The red color of the surface of the structure shows alpha helices, the yellow shows beta sheets, and the green area shows where there are loops in the enzyme.

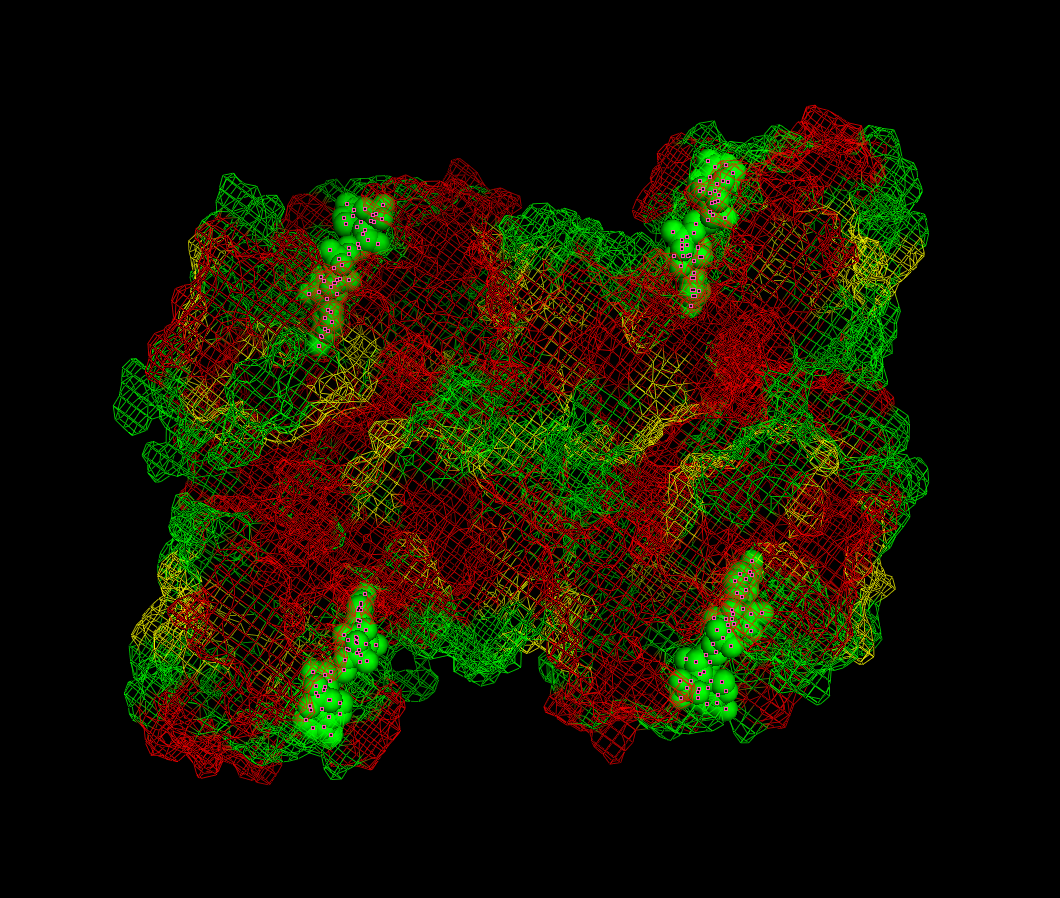
The AroE form of shikimate dehydrogenase with highlighted NADP^{+} binding sites. The red color shows where the alpha helices are, the green shows the loops, and the yellow shows the beta sheets in the structure.

== Applications ==
The shikimate pathway is a target for herbicides and other non-toxic drugs because the shikimate pathway is not present in humans. Glyphosate, a commonly used herbicide, is an inhibitor of 5-enolpyruvylshikimate 3-phosphate synthase or EPSP synthase, an enzyme in the shikimate pathway. The problem is that this herbicide has been utilized for about 20 years and now some plants have now emerged that are glyphosate-resistant. This has relevance to research on shikimate dehydrogenase because it is important to maintain diversity in the enzyme blocking process in the shikimate pathway and with more research shikimate dehydrogenase could be the next enzyme to be inhibited in the shikimate pathway. In order to design new inhibitors the structures for all the enzymes in the pathway have needed to be elucidated. The presence of two forms of the enzyme complicate the design of potential drugs because one could compensate for the inhibition of the other. Also there the TIGR data base shows that there are 14 species of bacteria with the two forms of shikimate dehydrogenase. This is a problem for drug makers because there are two enzymes that a potential drug would need to inhibit at the same time.
