= Aminoshikimic acid =

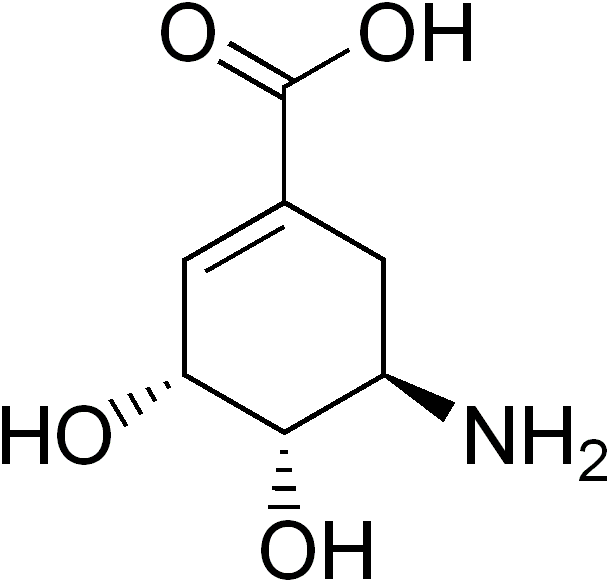

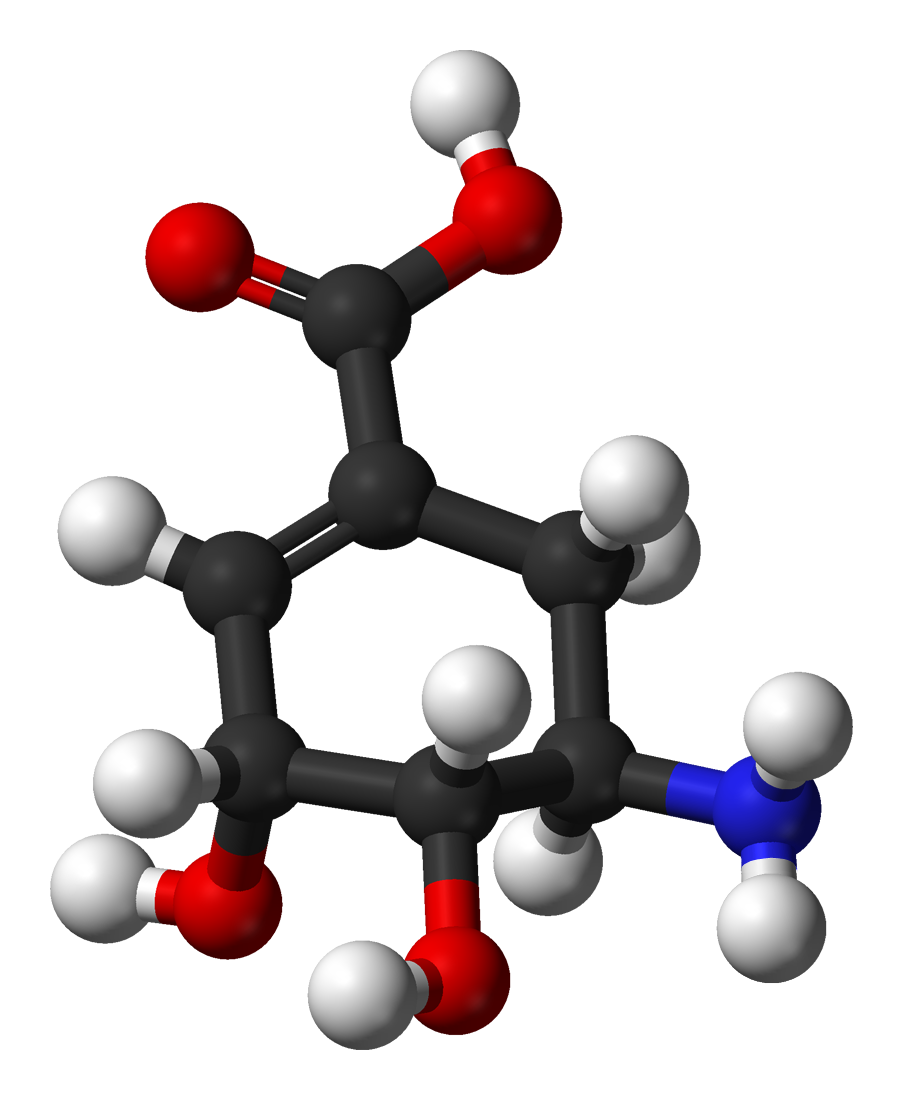

Names
- Preferred IUPAC name (3R,4S,5R)-5-Amino-3,4-dihydroxycyclohex-1-ene-1-carboxylic acid
- Other names Aminoshikimate

Identifiers
CAS Number	178948-66-8
3D model (JSmol)	Interactive image
ChemSpider	391778
PubChem CID	443636
UNII	74Z3GVA58B
CompTox Dashboard (EPA)	DTXSID70332123
- InChI: InChI=1S/C7H11NO4/c8-4-1-3(7(11)12)2-5(9)6(4)10/h2,4-6,9-10H,1,8H2,(H,11,12)/t4-,5-,6+/m1/s1 Key: GSAKPGCLECHWSP-PBXRRBTRSA-N; InChI=1/C7H11NO4/c8-4-1-3(7(11)12)2-5(9)6(4)10/h2,4-6,9-10H,1,8H2,(H,11,12)/t4-,5-,6+/m1/s1 Key: GSAKPGCLECHWSP-PBXRRBTRBE
- SMILES: O=C(O)/C1=C/[C@@H](O)[C@@H](O)[C@H](N)C1

Properties
Chemical formula	C_{7}H_{11}NO_{4}
Molar mass	173.168 g·mol^{−1}
- Except where otherwise noted, data are given for materials in their standard state (at 25 °C [77 °F], 100 kPa). verify (what is ?) Infobox references

Aminoshikimic acid is a synthetic crystalline carboxylic acid. It is characterized by multiple stereogenic centers and functional groups arrayed around a six-membered carbocyclic ring. Aminoshikimic acid is also an alternative to shikimic acid as a starting material for the synthesis of neuraminidase inhibitors such as the antiinfluenza agent oseltamivir (Tamiflu).

== History ==
Aminoshikimic acid is an unnatural carbohydrate, although aminoshikimic acid is the namesake of the aminoshikimate pathway, which generates the 3-amino-5-hydroxybenzoic acid (AHBA) starter unit required for the biosynthesis of the ansamycins and mitomycins. The first microbe-catalyzed syntheses of aminoshikimic acid were described by Guo and Frost in 2004.

== Pharmaceutical uses ==
Aminoshikimic acid is an intriguing alternative to shikimic acid as a starting material for the synthesis of neuraminidase inhibitors such as the antiinfluenza agent oseltamivir. Aminoshikimic acid is also a versatile chiral starting material for the synthesis of new pharmaceuticals. As with shikimic acid, aminoshikimic acid is an attractive candidate for use as the core scaffold for synthesis of combinatorial libraries.
