= DAHP synthase =

Class of enzymes

3-deoxy-7-phosphoheptulonate synthase

Identifiers
- EC no.: 2.5.1.54
- CAS no.: 9026-94-2

Databases
- BRENDA: enzyme data
- ExPASy: NiceZyme view
- KEGG: enzyme entry
- MetaCyc: metabolic pathway
- Rhea: reactions
- PDB structures: RCSB PDB PDBe PDBsum
- Gene Ontology: AmiGO / QuickGO
Search
- PMC: articles
- PubMed: articles
- NCBI: proteins

DAHP synthetase I domain
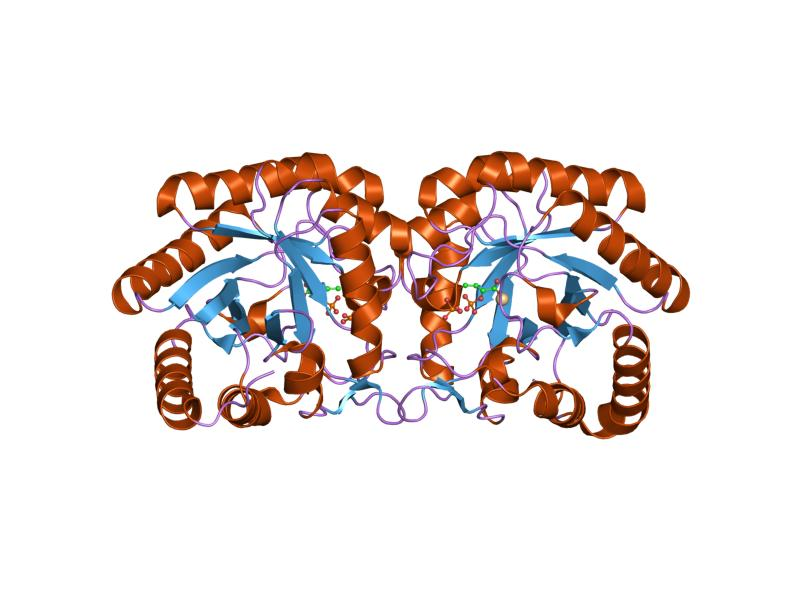
- Structure of Aquifex aeolicus kdo8ps in complex with z-methyl-pep 2-dehydro-3-deoxyphosphooctonate aldolase.

Identifiers
- Symbol: DAHP_synth_1
- Pfam: PF00793
- Pfam clan: CL0036
- InterPro: IPR006218
- SCOP2: 51569 / SCOPe / SUPFAM
Available protein structures:
- PDB: IPR006218 PF00793 (ECOD; PDBsum)
- AlphaFold: IPR006218; PF00793

3-Deoxy-D-arabinoheptulosonate 7-phosphate (DAHP) synthase (EC 2.5.1.54) is the first enzyme in a series of metabolic reactions known as the shikimate pathway, which is responsible for the biosynthesis of the amino acids phenylalanine, tyrosine, and tryptophan. Since it is the first enzyme in the shikimate pathway, it controls the amount of carbon entering the pathway. Enzyme inhibition is the primary method of regulating the amount of carbon entering the pathway. Forms of this enzyme differ between organisms, but can be considered DAHP synthase based upon the reaction that is catalyzed by this enzyme:

phosphoenolpyruvate + D-erythrose 4-phosphate + H_{2}O $\rightleftharpoons$ 3-deoxy-D-arabino-hept-2-ulosonate 7-phosphate + phosphate

The three substrates of this enzyme are phosphoenolpyruvate, D-erythrose 4-phosphate, and water. Its products are 3-deoxy-D-arabino-hept-2-ulosonate 7-phosphate and orthophosphate.

== Nomenclature ==
This enzyme belongs to the family of transferases, to be specific those transferring aryl or alkyl groups other than methyl groups. The systematic name of this enzyme class is phosphoenolpyruvate:D-erythrose-4-phosphate C-(1-carboxyvinyl)transferase (phosphate-hydrolysing, 2-carboxy-2-oxoethyl-forming). Other names in common use include 2-dehydro-3-deoxy-phosphoheptonate aldolase, 2-keto-3-deoxy-D-arabino-heptonic acid 7-phosphate synthetase, 3-deoxy-D-arabino-2-heptulosonic acid 7-phosphate synthetase, 3-deoxy-D-arabino-heptolosonate-7-phosphate synthetase, 3-deoxy-D-arabino-heptulosonate 7-phosphate synthetase, 7-phospho-2-keto-3-deoxy-D-arabino-heptonate D-erythrose-4-phosphate, lyase (pyruvate-phosphorylating), 7-phospho-2-dehydro-3-deoxy-D-arabino-heptonate, D-erythrose-4-phosphate lyase (pyruvate-phosphorylating), D-erythrose-4-phosphate-lyase, D-erythrose-4-phosphate-lyase (pyruvate-phosphorylating), DAH7-P synthase, DAHP synthase, DS-Co, DS-Mn, KDPH synthase, KDPH synthetase, deoxy-D-arabino-heptulosonate-7-phosphate synthetase, phospho-2-dehydro-3-deoxyheptonate aldolase, phospho-2-keto-3-deoxyheptanoate aldolase, phospho-2-keto-3-deoxyheptonate aldolase, phospho-2-keto-3-deoxyheptonic aldolase, and phospho-2-oxo-3-deoxyheptonate aldolase.

== Biological function ==
The primary function of DAHP synthase is to catalyze the reaction of phosphoenolpyruvate and D-erythrose 4-phosphate to DAHP and phosphate. DAHP synthase is the first enzyme that acts in the Shikimate Pathway in microorganisms, fungi, and plants. A series of catalytic mechanisms result in the production of aromatic amino acids required for metabolism. However, another biological function of the enzyme is to regulate the amount of carbon that enters the shikimate pathway. This is accomplished primarily through two different methods, feedback inhibition and transcriptional control. Feedback inhibition and transcriptional control are both mechanisms of regulating carbon in bacteria, but the only mechanism of regulation found in DAHP synthase found in plants is transcriptional control.

In Escherichia coli, a species of bacteria, DAHP synthase is found as three isoenzymes, each of which sensitive to one of the amino acids produced in the shikimate pathway. In a study of DAHP synthase sensitive to tyrosine in E. coli, it was determined that the enzyme is inhibited by tyrosine through noncompetitive inhibition with respect to phosphoenolpyruvate, the first substrate of the reaction catalyzed by DAHP synthase, while the enzyme is inhibited by tyrosine through competitive inhibition with respect to D-erythrose 4-phosphate, the second substrate of the reaction catalyzed by DAHP synthase when the concentration of tyrosine is above 10 μM. It was also determined that the enzyme is inhibited by inorganic phosphate through noncompetitive inhibition with respect to both substrates and inhibited by DAHP through competitive inhibition with respect to phosphoenolpyruvate and noncompetitive inhibition with respect to D-erythrose 4-phosphate. Phenylalanine is also a feedback inhibitor of DAHPS, as it is produced downstream in the Shikimate Pathway. Studies of product inhibition have shown that phosphoenolpyruvate is the first substrate to bind to the enzyme complex, inorganic phosphate is the first product to dissociate from the enzyme complex. Thus the amount of carbon entering the shikimate pathway can be controlled by inhibiting DAHP synthase from catalyzing the reaction that forms DAHP.

Carbon flow into the shikimate pathway in plants is regulated by transcriptional control. This method is also found in bacteria, but feedback inhibition is more prevalent. In plants, as the plants progressed through the growth cycle, the activity of DAHP synthase changed.

Since DAHP synthase is required for the production of essential aromatic amino acids such as tyrosine, phenylalanine, and tryptophan. Aromatic amino acids are necessary for protein synthesis. Without a functioning DAHP synthase, the cell will not have sufficient resources to synthesize proteins. Clinical use of inhibitors for the Shikimate Pathway in bacteria control or slow the growth of parasites. Inhibition could potentially act as an antimicrobial for specific parasites such as Toxoplasma gondii, Plasmodium falciparum, and Cryptosporidium parvum.

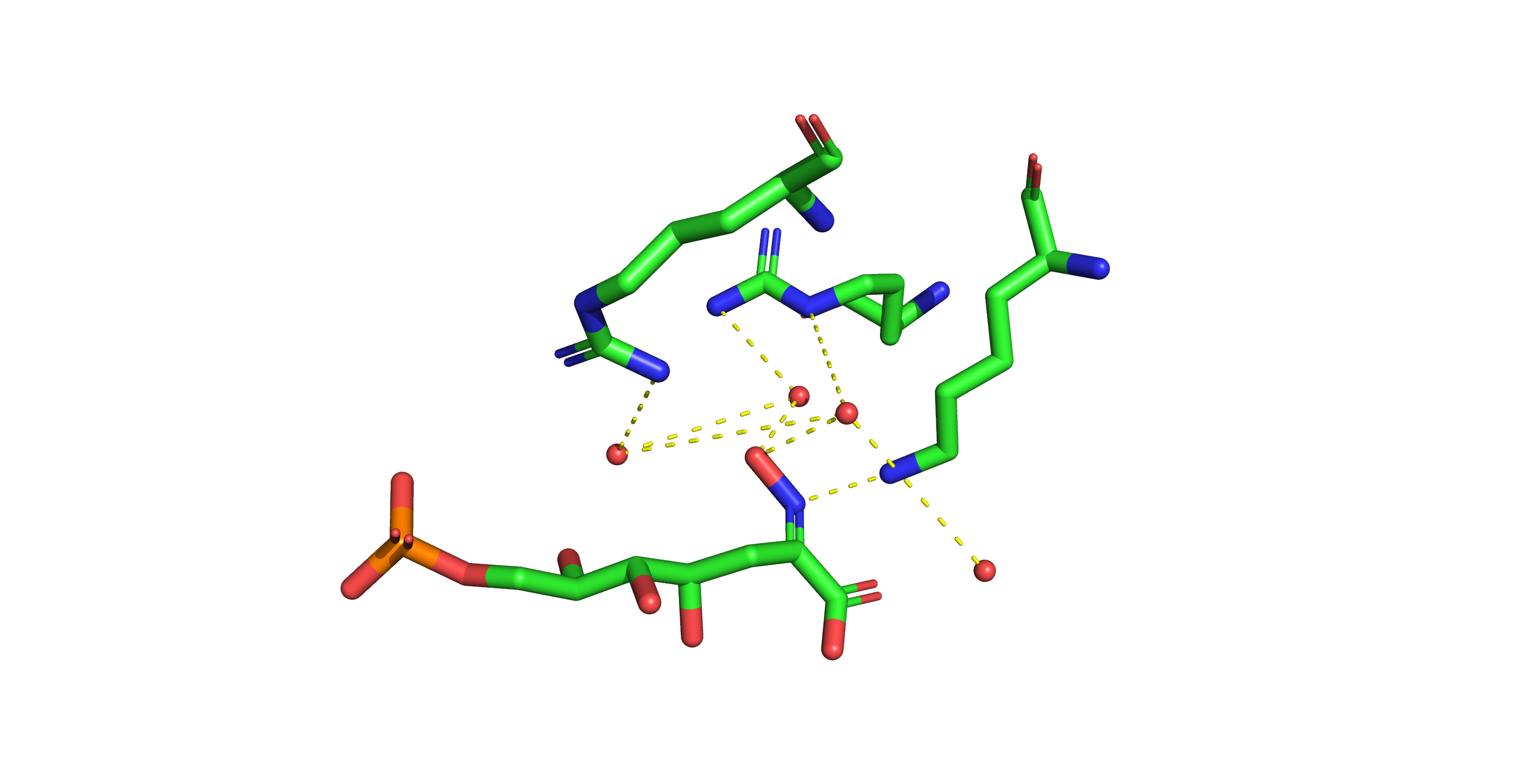
DAHP oxime in complex with DAHP synthase active site residues. DAHP synthase derived from E. coli. DAHP oxime and the active site interact with water molecules to stabilize the transition state. PDB code 5CKS. DAHP oxime pictured on bottom with (left to right)165R, 234R, and 186K.

A study on DAHP oxime revealed that it is a good inhibitor for DAHP synthase and can be implemented for antimicrobial purposes. DAHP oxime is considered a phosphate mimic, meaning it resembles a phosphate group's atom and electron distribution. Because DAHP oxime is a phosphate group mimic, it can occupy the active site space similarly. Interactions between 2 water molecules and three active site amino acids, R165, R2234, and K181 allowed the inhibitor to occupy the active site residues in DAHP synthase. Stabilization of the transition state increases the affinity for the inhibitor, effectively inhibiting DAHP synthase from functioning. It was also found that DAHP oxime is competitive with the cofactor ion manganese. When DAHP oxime was bound, manganese could not bind. Researchers continue to study methods of inhibition of the shikimate pathway to prevent the growth of parasitic microbes. Inhibiting the first enzyme of this pathway would prevent vital amino acids from being synthesized, halting the production of proteins and slowing growth.

== Catalytic activity ==
Metal ions are required in order for DAHP synthase to catalyze reactions. In DAHP synthase, it has been shown that binding site contains patterns of cysteine and histidine residues bound to metal ions in a Cys-X-X-His fashion.

It has been shown that, in general, DAHP synthases require a bivalent metal ion cofactor in order for the enzyme to function properly. Metal ions that can function as cofactors include Mn^{2+}, Fe^{2+}, Co^{2+}, Zn^{2+}, Cu^{2+}, and Ca^{2+}. Studies have suggested that one metal ion bonds to each monomer of DAHP synthase.

The reaction catalyzed by DAHP synthase is shown below.

Biosynthesis of DAHP from phosphoenolpyruvate and erythrose-4-phosphate.

== Structure ==
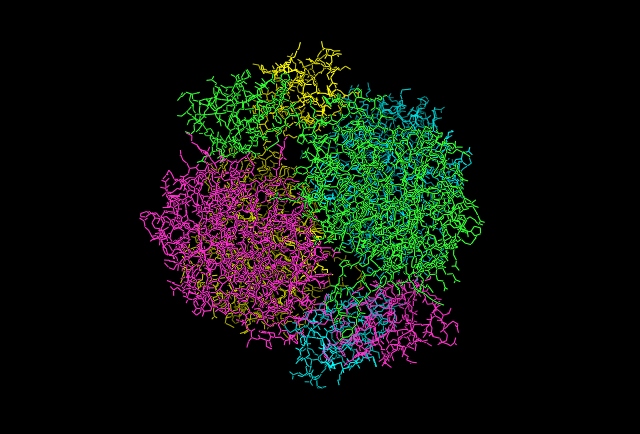
This image shows the quaternary structure of DAHP synthase.

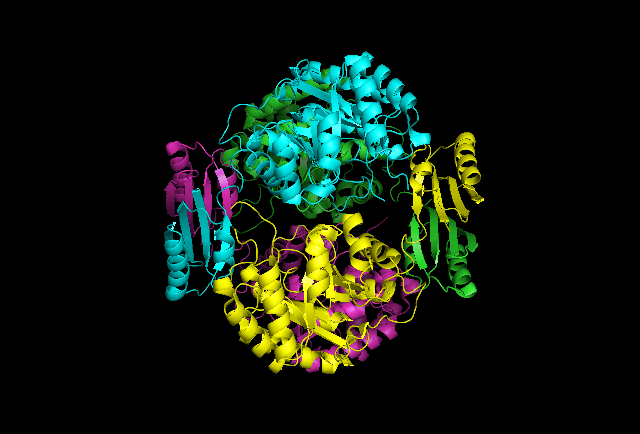
This image shows the quaternary structure of DAHP synthase, with the secondary and tertiary structures illustrated in cartoon form.

The quaternary structure of DAHP synthase consists of two tightly bound dimers, which means that DAHP synthase is a tetramer.

To the right is an image of DAHP synthase that shows the quaternary structure of DAHP synthase. This image shows that DAHP synthase consists of two tightly bound dimers. Each of the monomer chains is colored differently.

Below the first image to the right is an image of DAHP synthase that also shows quaternary structure, however this image is in a cartoon view. This view also shows each of the four monomers colored differently. In addition, this view can also be used to show secondary and tertiary structures. As shown, two of the monomers have beta sheets that interact on one side of the enzyme, while the other two monomers have beta sheets that interact on the opposite side.

== Structural studies ==
As of late 2007, four structures have been solved for this class of enzymes, with PDB accession codes PDB: 1RZM, PDB: 1VR6, PDB: 1VS1, and PDB: 2B7O.

Class-II DAHP synthetase family

Identifiers
- Symbol: DAHP_synth_2
- Pfam: PF01474
- Pfam clan: CL0036
- InterPro: IPR002480
Available protein structures:
- PDB: IPR002480 PF01474 (ECOD; PDBsum)
- AlphaFold: IPR002480; PF01474
