= Erythrose 4-phosphate =

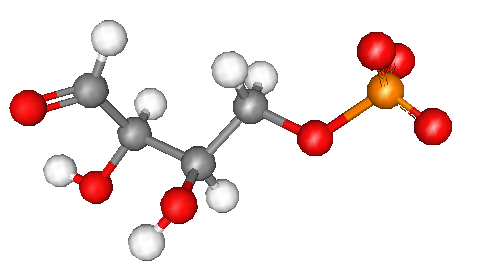

Names
- IUPAC names [(2R,3R)-2,3-Dihydroxy-4-oxobutyl] phosphate d-Erythrose 4-(dihydrogen phosphate)
- Other names E4P

Identifiers
CAS Number	585-18-2
3D model (JSmol)	Interactive image
ChEBI	CHEBI:48153
ChemSpider	109096
MeSH	erythrose+4-phosphate
PubChem CID	122357
UNII	2156QF7O8M
- InChI: InChI=1S/C4H9O7P/c5-1-3(6)4(7)2-11-12(8,9)10/h1,3-4,6-7H,2H2,(H2,8,9,10)/t3-,4+/m0/s1 Key: NGHMDNPXVRFFGS-IUYQGCFVSA-N
- SMILES: O=C[C@H](O)[C@H](O)COP(=O)(O)O

Properties
Chemical formula	C_{4}H_{9}O_{7}P
Molar mass	200.084 g/mol
- Except where otherwise noted, data are given for materials in their standard state (at 25 °C [77 °F], 100 kPa). Infobox references

Erythrose 4-phosphate is a phosphate of the simple sugar erythrose. It is an intermediate in the pentose phosphate pathway and the Calvin cycle.

The enzyme transaldolase catalyzes the formation of erythrose 4-phosphate and fructose 6-phosphate from sedoheptulose 7-phosphate and glyceraldehyde 3-phosphate. This reaction is a part of the non-oxidative phase of the pentose phosphate pathway.

In the Calvin cycle, the enzyme fructose-bisphosphate aldolase catalyzes the formation of sedoheptulose 1,7-bisphosphate from erythrose 4-phosphate and dihydroxyacetone phosphate.

In addition, it serves as a precursor in the biosynthesis of the aromatic amino acids tyrosine, phenylalanine, and tryptophan. It is used in the first step of the shikimate pathway. At this stage, phosphoenolpyruvate and erythrose-4-phosphate react to form 3-deoxy-D-arabinoheptulosonate-7-phosphate (DAHP), in a reaction catalyzed by the enzyme DAHP synthase.

Biosynthesis of DAHP from phosphoenolpyruvate and erythrose-4-phosphate

It also used in 3-hydroxy-1-aminoacetone phosphate biosynthesis, which is a precursor of vitamin B6 in DXP-dependent pathway. Erythrose-4-phosphate dehydrogenase is used to produce 4-phospho-D-erythronic acid:

erythrose 4-phosphate
+ NAD^{+}
H_{2}O
H^{+}
H_{2}O
H^{+}
4-phospho-D-erythronic acid
+ NADH
