= 3-Deoxy-D-arabino-heptulosonic acid 7-phosphate =

- Fischer projection of DAHP

Names
- IUPAC name 3-Deoxy-7-O-phosphono-D-arabino-hept-2-ulosonic acid
- Systematic IUPAC name (4R,5S,6R)-4,5,6-Trihydroxy-2-oxo-7-(phosphonooxy)heptanoic acid
- Other names 3-Deoxy-D-arabino-heptulosonic acid 7-phosphate 3-Deoxy-D-arabino-heptulosonate-7-phosphate; DAHP; 7-Phospho-2-dehydro-3-deoxy-D-arabino-heptonate

Identifiers
CAS Number	2627-73-8
3D model (JSmol)	Interactive image
ChemSpider	141160
PubChem CID	160647
CompTox Dashboard (EPA)	DTXSID30949135
- InChI: InChI=1S/C7H13O10P/c8-3(1-4(9)7(12)13)6(11)5(10)2-17-18(14,15)16/h3,5-6,8,10-11H,1-2H2,(H,12,13)(H2,14,15,16)/t3-,5-,6+/m1/s1 Key: PJWIPEXIFFQAQZ-PUFIMZNGSA-N; InChI=1/C7H13O10P/c8-3(1-4(9)7(12)13)6(11)5(10)2-17-18(14,15)16/h3,5-6,8,10-11H,1-2H2,(H,12,13)(H2,14,15,16)/t3-,5-,6+/m1/s1 Key: PJWIPEXIFFQAQZ-PUFIMZNGBD
- SMILES: C([C@H]([C@@H]([C@@H](COP(=O)(O)O)O)O)O)C(=O)C(=O)O

Properties
Chemical formula	C_{7}H_{13}O_{10}P
Molar mass	288.145 g·mol^{−1}
- Except where otherwise noted, data are given for materials in their standard state (at 25 °C [77 °F], 100 kPa). Infobox references

3-Deoxy-D-arabino-heptulosonic acid 7-phosphate (DAHP) is a 7-carbon ulosonic acid. This compound is found in the shikimic acid biosynthesis pathway and is an intermediate in the production of aromatic amino acids.

Phosphoenolpyruvate and erythrose-4-phosphate react to form 3-deoxy-D-arabino-heptulosonate-7-phosphate (DAHP), in a reaction catalyzed by the enzyme DAHP synthase.

Biosynthesis of DAHP from phosphoenolpyruvate and erythrose-4-phosphate.

DAHP is then transformed to 3-dehydroquinate (DHQ), in a reaction catalyzed by DHQ synthase. Although this reaction requires nicotinamide adenine dinucleotide (NAD) as a cofactor, the enzymic mechanism regenerates it, resulting in the net use of no NAD.

Biosynthesis of quinate catalyzed by 3-dehydroquinate synthase.

The mechanism of ring closure is complex, but involves an aldol condensation at C-2 and C-7.

Metabolic engineering has improved production of DAHP by Escherichia coli. The first step, condensation of 3-deoxy-D-arabino-heptulosonic acid 7-phosphate (DAHP) from PEP/E4P, uses three isoenzymes AroF, AroG, and AroH. Each one of these has its synthesis regulated from tyrosine, phenylalanine, and tryptophan, respectively. These isoenzymes all have the ability to help regulate synthesis of DAHP by the method of feedback inhibition. This acts in the cell by monitoring the concentrations of each of the three aromatic amino acids. When there is too much of any one of them, that one will allosterically control the DAHP synthetase by “turning it off”. With the first step of the common pathway shut off, synthesis of the three amino acids can not proceed. The rest of the enzymes is in the common pathway (conversion of DAHP to chorismate).

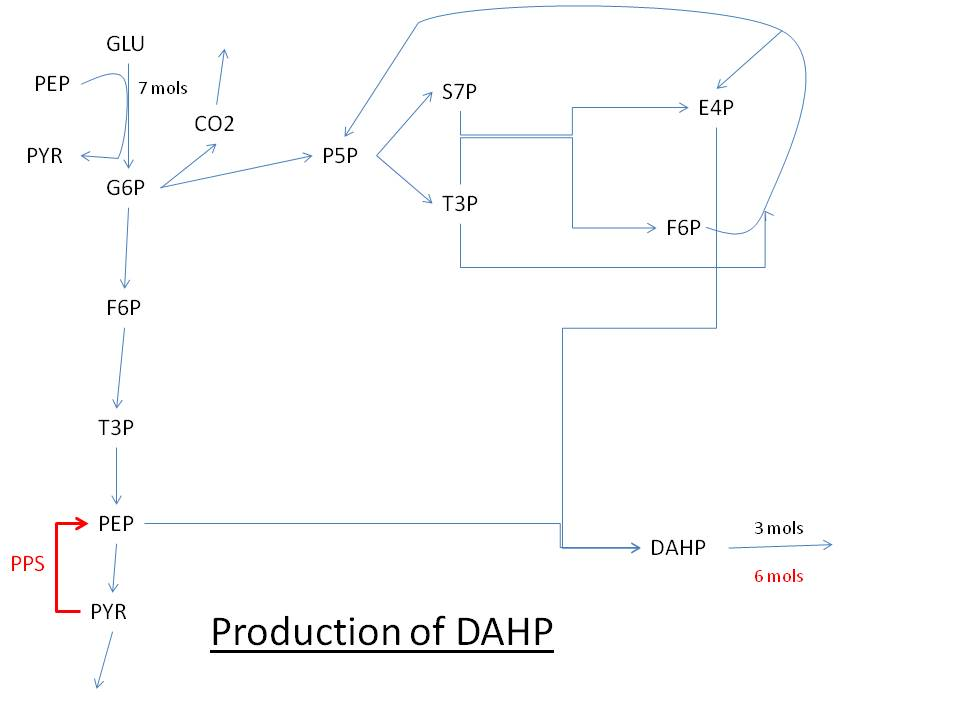
Pathway for the production of DAHP using glucose. Abbreviations: GLU: glucose, G6P: Glucose 6-phosphate, PEP: Phosphoenolpyruvate, PYR: Pyruvate, F6P: Fructose 6-phosphate, P5P: Pentose 5-phosphate (ribose or xylulose 5-phosphate) T3P: Glyceraldehyde 3-phosphate, S7P: Sedoheptulose 7-phosphate, E4P: Erythrose-4-phosphate, PPS: PEP synthase.
