= ACPD =

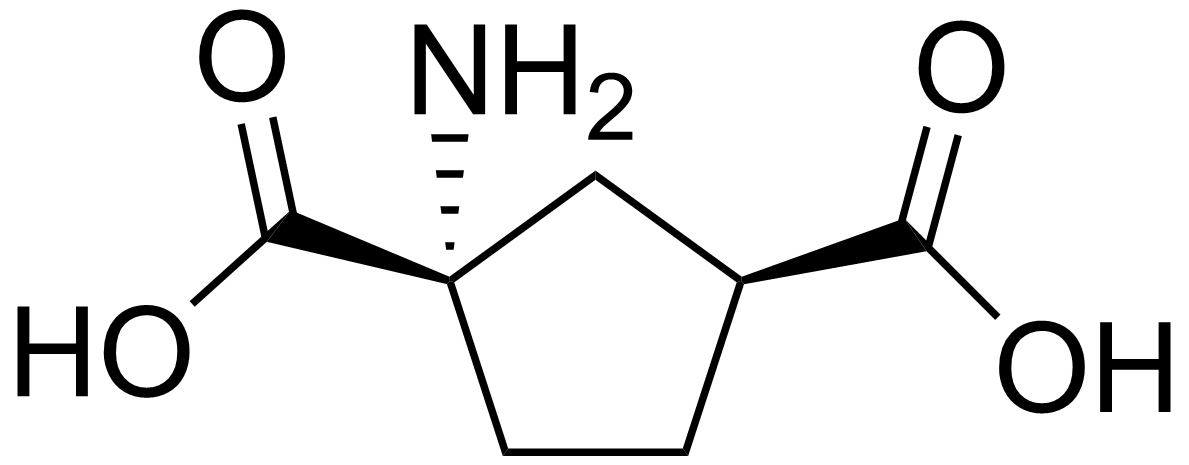
- Stereo, skeletal formula of ACPD ((1S,3S)-1-amino,-1,3-dicarboxylic acid)

Names
- Preferred IUPAC name 1-Aminocyclopentane-1,3-dicarboxylic acid

Identifiers
| CAS Number | 39026-63-6; 56827-69-1 (1R,3S); 111900-32-4 (1S,3R) |
| 3D model (JSmol) | Interactive image |
| Abbreviations | ACPD |
| ChEMBL | ChEMBL168278 |
| ChemSpider | 1270; 201559 (1R,3R); 66220 (1R,3S); 94574 (1S,3R); 5036967 (1S,3S) |
| MeSH | 1-amino-1,3-dicarboxycyclopentane |
| PubChem CID | 1310; 44381972 (1S); 231345 (1R,3R); 73537 (1R,3S); 104766 (1S,3R); 6604704 (1S,3S) |
| RTECS number | GY4060000 (1S,3R) |
| CompTox Dashboard (EPA) | DTXSID701272273 |
- InChI: InChI=1S/C7H11NO4/c8-7(6(11)12)2-1-4(3-7)5(9)10/h4H,1-3,8H2,(H,9,10)(H,11,12) Key: YFYNOWXBIBKGHB-UHFFFAOYSA-N
- SMILES: NC1(CCC(C1)C(O)=O)C(O)=O

Properties
| Chemical formula | C_{7}H_{11}NO_{4} |
| Molar mass | 173.168 g·mol^{−1} |
| Appearance | White crystals |
| Solubility in water | 20 g dm^{−3} |
| Solubility in ethanol | 240 mg dm^{−3} |
| log P | −0.709 |
| Acidity (pK_{a}) | 2.112 |
| Basicity (pK_{b}) | 11.885 |
| Isoelectric point | 2.84 |

Hazards
- GHS labelling
| Pictograms | (GHS07: Exclamation mark) |
| Signal word | Warning |
| Hazard statements | H302, H312, H315, H319, H332, H335 |
| Precautionary statements | P261, P280, P305+P351+P338 |
- Except where otherwise noted, data are given for materials in their standard state (at 25 °C [77 °F], 100 kPa). verify (what is ?) Infobox references

1-Amino-1,3-dicarboxycyclopentane (ACPD) is a chemical compound that binds to the metabotropic glutamate receptor (mGluR), acting as a mGluR agonist. ACPD is a rigid analogue of the neurotransmitter glutamate and does not activate ionotropic glutamate receptors. However, it has been reported to be an agonist of the glycine site of the NMDA receptor. ACPD can induce convulsions in neonatal rats.
