= Chlorogenic acid =

- Chlorogenic acid

Names
- Preferred IUPAC name (1S,3R,4R,5R)-3-{[(2E)-3-(3,4-Dihydroxyphenyl)prop-2-enoyl]oxy}-1,4,5-trihydroxycyclohexane-1-carboxylic acid
- Other names 3-(3,4-Dihydroxycinnamoyl)quinate; 3-(3,4-Dihydroxycinnamoyl)quinic acid 3-Caffeoylquinate; 3-Caffeoylquinic acid 3-CQA; 3-O-Caffeoylquinic acid Chlorogenate; Chlorogenic acid Heriguard; 3-trans-Caffeoylquinic acid 5-O-Caffeoylquinic acid

Identifiers
CAS Number	202650-88-2; 327-97-9 (E/Z)
3D model (JSmol)	Interactive image
ChEBI	CHEBI:16112
ChEMBL	ChEMBL284616
ChemSpider	1405788
KEGG	C00852
PubChem CID	1794427
RTECS number	GU8480000
UNII	318ADP12RI (E)
CompTox Dashboard (EPA)	DTXSID101318952
- InChI: InChI=1S/C16H18O9/c17-9-3-1-8(5-10(9)18)2-4-13(20)25-12-7-16(24,15(22)23)6-11(19)14(12)21/h1-5,11-12,14,17-19,21,24H,6-7H2,(H,22,23)/b4-2+/t11-,12-,14-,16+/m1/s1 Key: CWVRJTMFETXNAD-JUHZACGLSA-N; InChI=1/C16H18O9/c17-9-3-1-8(5-10(9)18)2-4-13(20)25-12-7-16(24,15(22)23)6-11(19)14(12)21/h1-5,11-12,14,17-19,21,24H,6-7H2,(H,22,23)/b4-2+/t11-,12-,14-,16+/m1/s1 Key: CWVRJTMFETXNAD-JUHZACGLBD
- SMILES: O=C(O)[C@]2(O)C[C@@H](O)[C@@H](O)[C@H](OC(=O)\C=C\c1ccc(O)c(O)c1)C2

Properties
Chemical formula	C_{16}H_{18}O_{9}
Molar mass	354.311 g·mol^{−1}
Density	1.28 g/cm^{3}
Melting point	207 to 209 °C (405 to 408 °F; 480 to 482 K)

Hazards
- GHS labelling
Pictograms	(GHS07: Exclamation mark)
Signal word	Warning
Hazard statements	H315, H319, H335
Precautionary statements	P261, P264, P271, P280, P302+P352, P304+P340, P305+P351+P338, P312, P321, P332+P313, P337+P313, P362, P403+P233, P405, P501
NFPA 704 (fire diamond)	1 0
Safety data sheet (SDS)	External MSDS
- Except where otherwise noted, data are given for materials in their standard state (at 25 °C [77 °F], 100 kPa). verify (what is ?) Infobox references

The term Chlorogenic acid is used in two contexts. When used as a plural, it refers to a broad range of esters of trans-hydroxycinnamic acids with the hydroxyl groups of quinic acid. These hydroxycinnamic acids include coumaric-, caffeic-, ferulic- and sinapic acids. When used as a singular, Chlorogenic acid (abbreviated CGA) is specifically the ester of caffeic acid and quinic acid, functioning as an intermediate in lignin biosynthesis. This latter use is the subject of this article.

== History and nomenclature ==
The ester of caffeic acid and quinic acid was identified in 1932. Subsequently, the scope of this family of conjugates was shown to be great. Chlorogenic acids are now recognized as being widespread in plants, including many foods.

Despite the "chloro" of the name, chlorogenic acids contain no chlorine. Instead, the name comes from the Greek χλωρός (khloros, light green) and -γένος (genos, a suffix meaning "giving rise to"), pertaining to the green color produced when chlorogenic acids are oxidized.

== Structural properties ==
Structurally, chlorogenic acid is the ester formed between caffeic acid and the 3-hydroxyl of L-quinic acid. Isomers of chlorogenic acid include the caffeoyl ester at other hydroxyl sites on the quinic acid ring: 4-O-caffeoylquinic acid (cryptochlorogenic acid or 4-CQA) and 5-O-caffeoylquinic acid (neochlorogenic acid or 5-CQA). The epimer at position 1 has not yet been reported.

Structures having more than one caffeic acid group are called isochlorogenic acids, and can be found in coffee. There are several isomers, such as 3,4-dicaffeoylquinic acid, 3,5-dicaffeoylquinic acid, and cynarine (1,5-dicaffeoylquinic acid).

== Biosynthesis and natural occurrence ==
4-Coumaroyl-CoA is the biosynthetic precursor to chlorogenic acid.

The biosynthetic precursor to chlorogenic acid is 4-coumaroyl-CoA, containing a single hydroxyl group on the aryl ring, which in turn is produced from cinnamic acid. The hydroxylation of the coumaryl ester, i.e. installing the second hydroxy group, is catalyzed by a cytochrome P450 enzyme.

Chlorogenic acid can be found in the bamboo Phyllostachys edulis, as well as in many other plants, such as the shoots of common heather (Calluna vulgaris).

=== In food ===
Chlorogenic acid and the related compounds cryptochlorogenic acid, and neochlorogenic acid have been found in the leaves of Hibiscus sabdariffa. Isomers of chlorogenic acid are found in potatoes. Chlorogenic acid is present in the flesh of eggplants, peaches, prunes and coffee beans.

Chlorogenic acid is not listed among food additive substances generally recognized as safe by the US Food and Drug Administration, as of 2025.

== Research ==
Chlorogenic acid is under preliminary research for its possible biological effects, although there is insufficient evidence for its effectiveness.

== Nomenclature ==
The atom-numbering of chlorogenic acid can be ambiguous. The order of numbering of atoms on the quinic acid ring was reversed in 1976 following IUPAC guidelines, with the consequence that 3-CQA became 5-CQA, and 5-CQA became 3-CQA. Both numbering systems remain in use, as of 2016. Wikipedia, and many chemical suppliers, continue to use the pre-1976 non-IUPAC numbering system.
