= Phosphoenolpyruvic acid =

Chemical compound

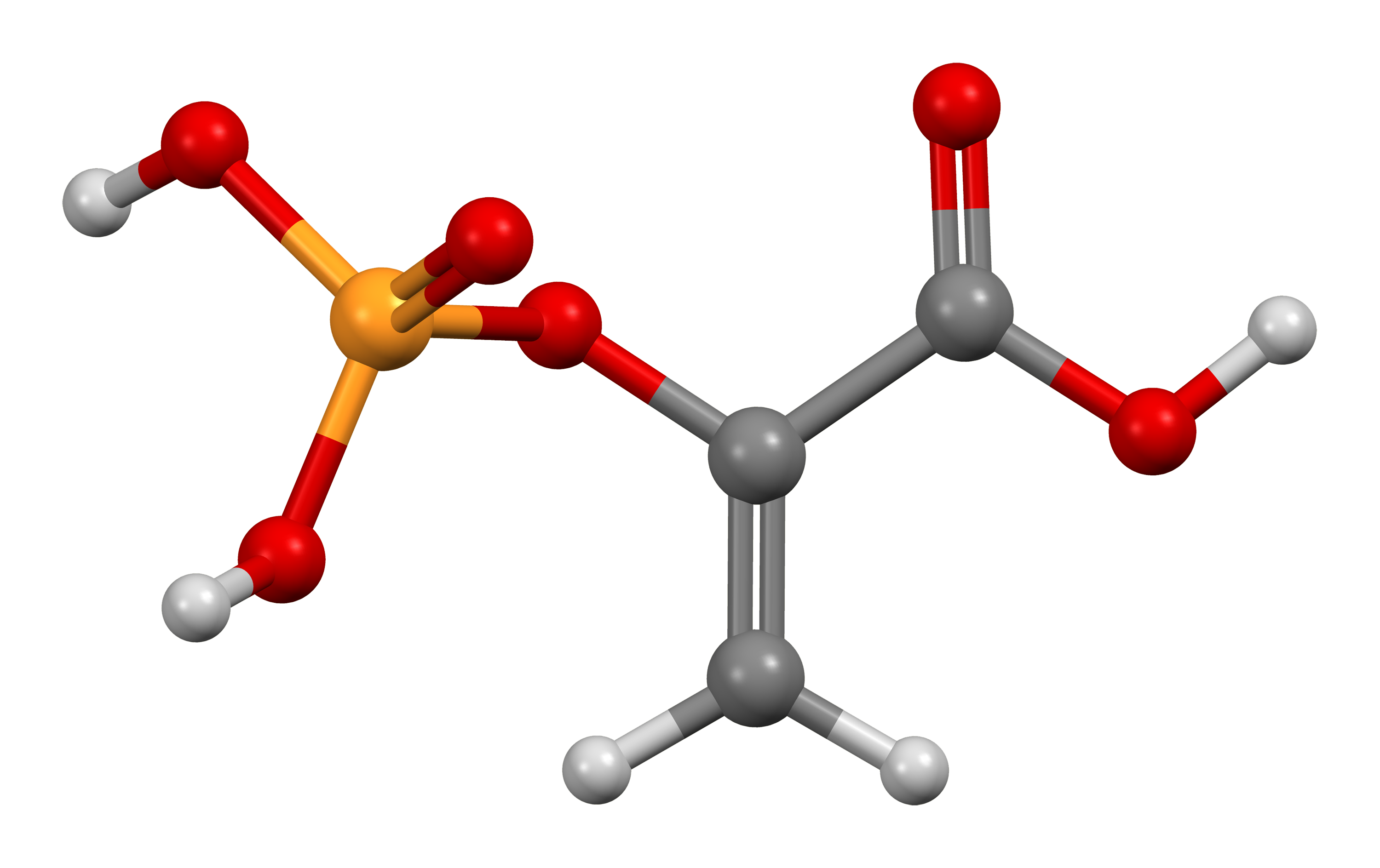

Names
- Preferred IUPAC name 2-(Phosphonooxy)prop-2-enoic acid
- Other names Phosphoenolpyruvic acid, PEP

Identifiers
CAS Number	138-08-9
3D model (JSmol)	Interactive image
ChEBI	CHEBI:44897
ChemSpider	980
DrugBank	DB01819
ECHA InfoCard	100.004.830
IUPHAR/BPS	4692
KEGG	C00074
PubChem CID	1005
UNII	545YL308OW
CompTox Dashboard (EPA)	DTXSID80861797
- InChI: InChI=1S/C3H5O6P/c1-2(3(4)5)9-10(6,7)8/h1H2,(H,4,5)(H2,6,7,8) Key: DTBNBXWJWCWCIK-UHFFFAOYSA-N
- SMILES: O=C(O)C(OP(=O)(O)O)=C

Properties
Chemical formula	C_{3}H_{5}O_{6}P
Molar mass	168.042
- Except where otherwise noted, data are given for materials in their standard state (at 25 °C [77 °F], 100 kPa). verify (what is ?) Infobox references

Phosphoenolpyruvate (2-phosphoenolpyruvate, PEP) is the carboxylic acid derived from the enol of pyruvate and a phosphate anion. It exists as an anion. PEP is an important intermediate in biochemistry. It has the highest-energy phosphate bond found (−61.9 kJ/mol) in organisms, and is involved in glycolysis and gluconeogenesis. In plants, it is also involved in the biosynthesis of various aromatic compounds, and in carbon fixation; in bacteria, it is also used as the source of energy for the phosphotransferase system.

== In glycolysis ==
PEP is formed by the action of the enzyme enolase on 2-phosphoglyceric acid. Metabolism of PEP to pyruvic acid by pyruvate kinase (PK) generates adenosine triphosphate (ATP) via substrate-level phosphorylation. ATP is one of the major currencies of chemical energy within cells.

2-phospho-D-glycerate	Enolase	phosphoenolpyruvate	Pyruvate kinase		pyruvate
	H_{2}O		ADP	ATP
	H_{2}O

Compound C00631 at KEGG Pathway Database. Enzyme 4.2.1.11 at KEGG Pathway Database. Compound C00074 at KEGG Pathway Database. Enzyme 2.7.1.40 at KEGG Pathway Database. Compound C00022 at KEGG Pathway Database.

== In gluconeogenesis ==
PEP is formed from the decarboxylation of oxaloacetate and hydrolysis of one guanosine triphosphate molecule. This reaction is catalyzed by the enzyme phosphoenolpyruvate carboxykinase (PEPCK). This reaction is a rate-limiting step in gluconeogenesis:

GTP + oxaloacetate → GDP + phosphoenolpyruvate + CO_{2}

== Interactive pathway map ==
Click on genes, proteins and metabolites below to link to respective articles. (Note: The interactive pathway map can be edited at WikiPathways: "GlycolysisGluconeogenesis_WP534".)

Glycolysis and Gluconeogenesis edit

== In plants ==
PEP may be used for the synthesis of chorismate through the shikimate pathway. Chorismate may then be metabolized into the aromatic amino acids (phenylalanine, tryptophan and tyrosine) and other aromatic compounds. The first step is when phosphoenolpyruvate and erythrose-4-phosphate react to form 3-deoxy-D-arabinoheptulosonate-7-phosphate (DAHP), in a reaction catalyzed by the enzyme DAHP synthase.

Biosynthesis of DAHP from phosphoenolpyruvate and erythrose-4-phosphate

In addition, in C_{4} plants, PEP serves as an important substrate in carbon fixation. The chemical equation, as catalyzed by phosphoenolpyruvate carboxylase (PEP carboxylase), is:

PEP + HCO^{−}_{3} → oxaloacetate
