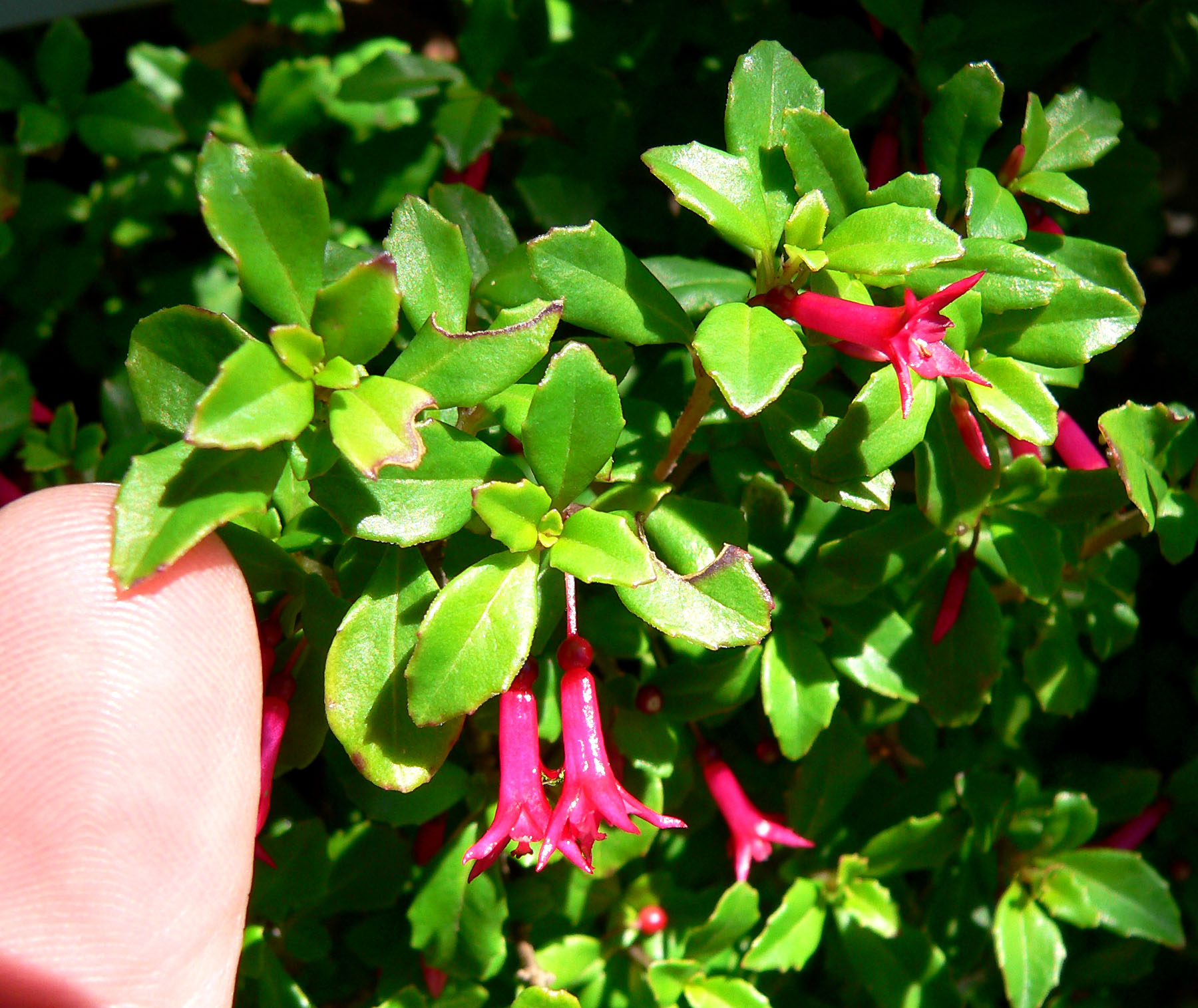
- Leaves and flowers of Fuchsia microphylla subsp. aprica

Scientific classification
- Kingdom: Plantae
- Clade: Tracheophytes
- Clade: Angiosperms
- Clade: Eudicots
- Clade: Rosids
- Order: Myrtales
- Family: Onagraceae
- Genus: Fuchsia
- Species: F. microphylla

Binomial name
- Fuchsia microphylla Kunth (1823)

Subspecies
- Fuchsia microphylla subsp. aprica (Lundell) Breedlove; Fuchsia microphylla subsp. chiapensis (Brandegee) P.E.Berry & Breedlove; Fuchsia microphylla subsp. hemsleyana (Woodson & Seibert) Breedlove; Fuchsia microphylla subsp. hidalgensis (Munz) Breedlove; Fuchsia microphylla subsp. microphylla Kunth; Fuchsia microphylla subsp. quercetorum Breedlove

Synonyms
- Fuchsia notarisii Lehm.; Fuchsia uniflora Sessé & Moc.; Fuchsia microphylla var. typica Munz; Fuchsia minutiflora var. typica Munz; (Fuchsia microphylla subsp. aprica): Fuchsia aprica Lundell; Fuchsia microphylla var. aprica (Lundell) Munz; (Fuchsia microphylla subsp. chiapensis): Fuchsia chiapensis T.S.Brandegee; Fuchsia heterotricha Lundell; (Fuchsia microphylla subsp. hemsleyana): Fuchsia hemsleyana R.E.Woodson & Seibert; Fuchsia pulchella R.E. Woodson & Seibert; (Fuchsia microphylla subsp. hidalgensis): Fuchsia minutiflora var. hidalgensis Munz; (Fuchsia microphylla subsp. microphylla): Brebissonia microphylla Spach; Fuchsia gracilis (Moc. & Sesse); Fuchsia mixta Hemsl.; Fuchsia splendens hort.; Fuchsia splendens hort. ex Dippel; Myrinia microphylla Lilja

= Fuchsia microphylla =

Species of plant

Fuchsia microphylla, also known as small leaf fuchsia and small-leaved fuchsia, is a flowering shrub in the family Onagraceae. The specific epithet (microphylla) was named for the plant's small (micro) leaves (phylla).

== Distribution ==
Fuchsia microphylla is native to southern Mexico south to Panama. It can be found growing in oak and pine woods in Mexico or low thickets and exposed rocky places in Guatemala between 1,200 and 3,800 meters (3,900 and 12,500 feet) in elevation.

== Description ==
It is a deciduous to semi-evergreen shrub which grows to 1.8 meters (5.9 feet) in height at a medium rate and has a spread width of 3 feet (0.91 meters). It is herbaceous, perennial, and hermaphrodite and is pollinated by insects. It flowers from September to October and attracts wildlife. It is hardy to UK zone 9 and USDA zones 8–11, and is not frost tolerant. It is cold hardy to 10–15 °F (−12 – −9 °C) with wall shelter. It grows well in light, medium, and heavy soils and prefers moist, well-drained soils. It is suitable for acid, neutral, and basic soils, and grows best in light and semi-shade conditions. The fruit is edible and is dark in color, round in shape, and measures up to 1.5 centimeters in diameter, although it normally measures 5 millimeters in diameter. The flavor is said to be sweet but mild. The plant is variable but usually grows erect, although in more shady woodland can develop climbing habits with stems 500 centimeters (16 feet) long. It normally forms clumps or bushes. It is both dioecious and self-fertile. The flowers are not fragrant and are tubular, pendent, and pink in color, and are very small. The leaves measure up to 4 centimeters in length, although are normally much smaller. They are generally oblanceolate to obovate in shape, although can be ovate or lanceolate and are usually toothed, though some varieties are not. New growth is red and the plant can be grown in a pot. Plants in the section Encliandra are defined by the protrusion of only four stamens from the flower tube, rather than eight. The other four stamens are enclosed within the tube.

== Uses ==
The plant is grown as an ornamental and the berries are collected locally and eaten.

== Pests ==
Fuchsia microphylla is vulnerable to whiteflies, capsid bugs, red spider mites, rust, aphids, black vine weevil, smut, gray mold, fuchsia gall mite, and fuchsia flea beetle. It is resistant to honey fungus and rabbits.

== Hybrids ==
Fuchsia × bacillaris, a natural hybrid between Fuchsia microphylla and Fuchsia thymifolia, was documented in 1832.

== Subspecies ==
Image	Name	Description	Distribution
	Fuchsia microphylla subsp. aprica (Lundell) Breedlove	Leaf blades elliptic and atteuate at the base, 1.5–2.5 cm long x 0.5–1 (–1.5) cm; glabrous on flower and leaves; flowers are magenta.	Mexico (Chiapas), El Salvador, Guatemala, Honduras. Found between 2,700–3,400 meters (8,900–11,200 feet).
	Fuchsia microphylla subsp. chiapensis (Brandegee) P.E.Berry & Breedlove	Leaf blades cunate at the base, 3–4 cm long x 1.5–2 cm wide; pubescent on flora tube, young stems and leaves; flowers are red.	El Salvador, Guatemala, Honduras, Mexico (Chiapas) in montane rainforest, evergreen cloud forest, and wet pine-oak forest at elevations between 1,800–2,400 meters (5,900–7,900 feet).
	Fuchsia microphylla subsp. hemsleyana (Woodson & Seibert) Breedlove	Petiole 4–15 mm long; flowers are red.	Costa Rica, Panama in the understory of evergreen cloud forests on the high volcano between 1,500–3,100 meters (4,900–10,200 feet).
	Fuchsia microphylla subsp. hidalgensis (Munz) Breedlove	Flowers are white.	Mexico (SE. Hidalgo to N. Puebla) in mixed evergreen forest with Pinus and Quercus between 1,600–2,200 meters (5,200–7,200 feet).
	Fuchsia microphylla subsp. microphylla Kunth	Flowers are magenta.	Mexico (Jalisco, Hidalgo, Guerrero, Oaxaca, Veracruz) in Pinus, Quercus, and Abies montane cloud forest between 2,100–3,200 meters (6,900–10,500 feet).
	Fuchsia microphylla subsp. quercetorum Breedlove	Flowers are red.	Mexico (Chiapas), Guatemala in open Pinus, Quercus, and Liquidambar forest between 1,500–2,200 meters (4,900–7,200 feet).

== Gallery ==
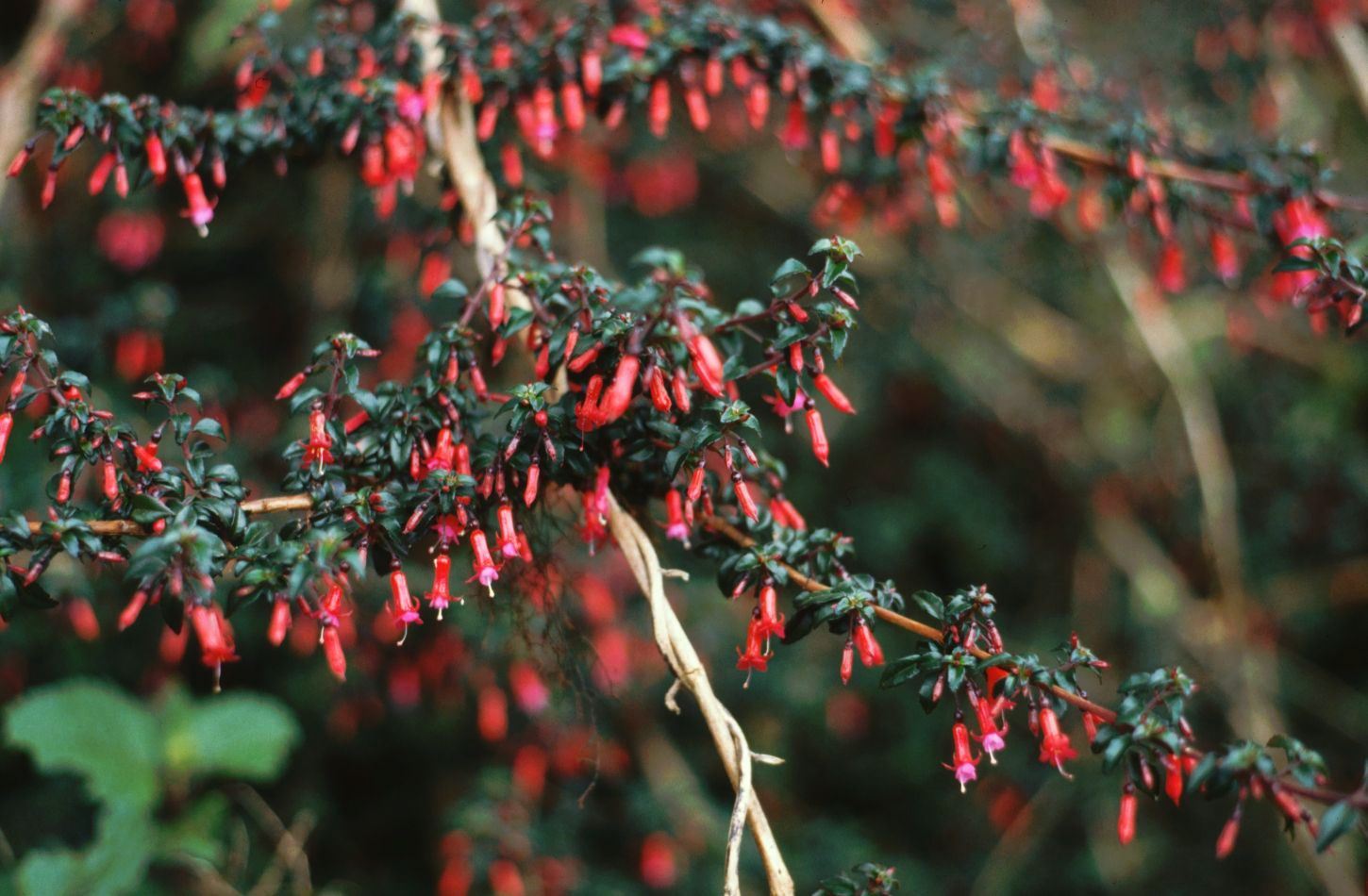
Branches of Fuchsia microphylla subsp. hemsleyana

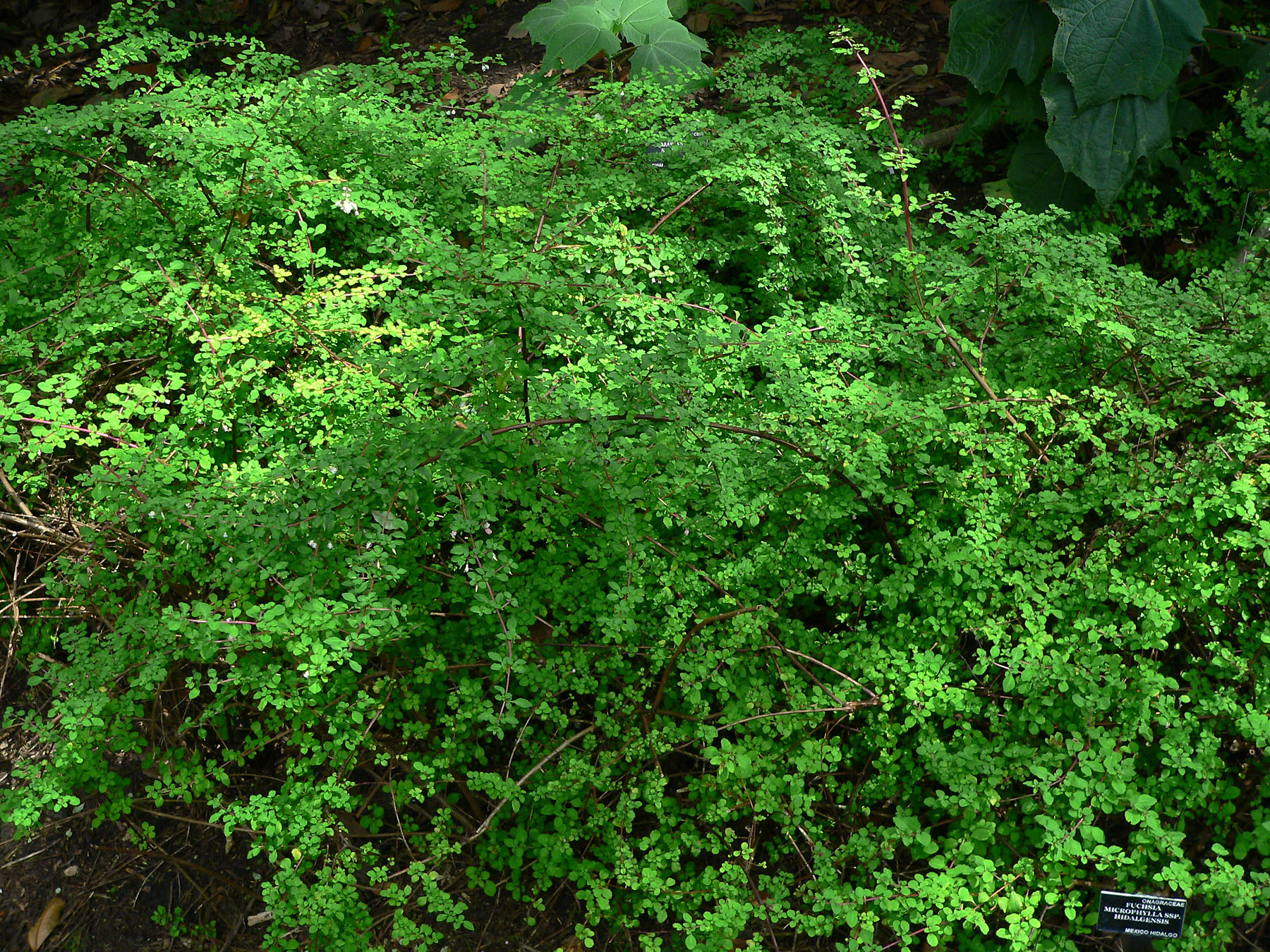
Fuchsia microphylla subsp. hidalgensis

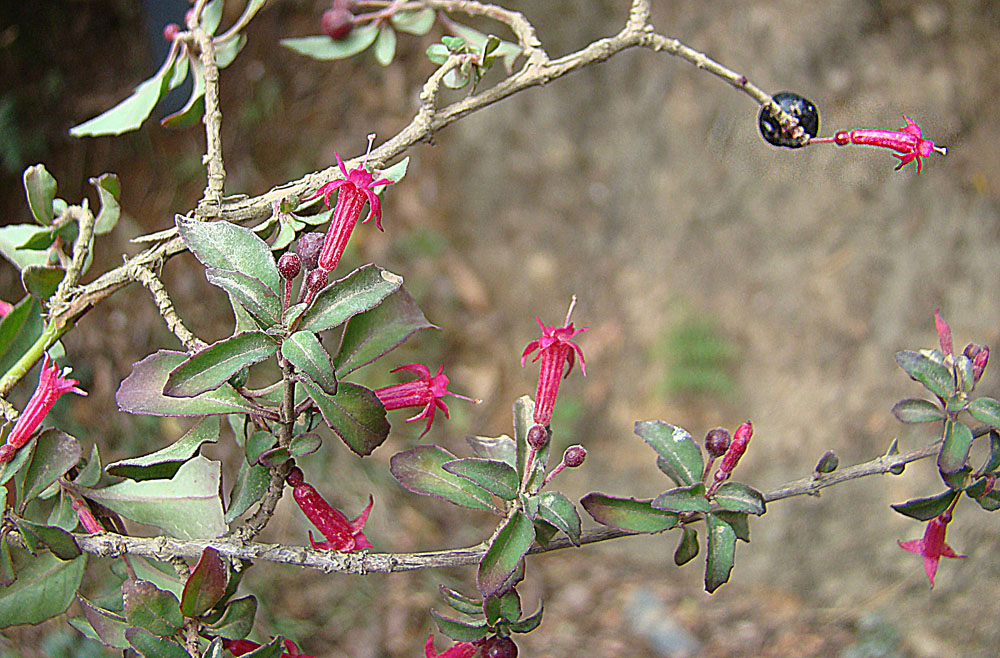
Fruiting branch of Fuchsia microphylla

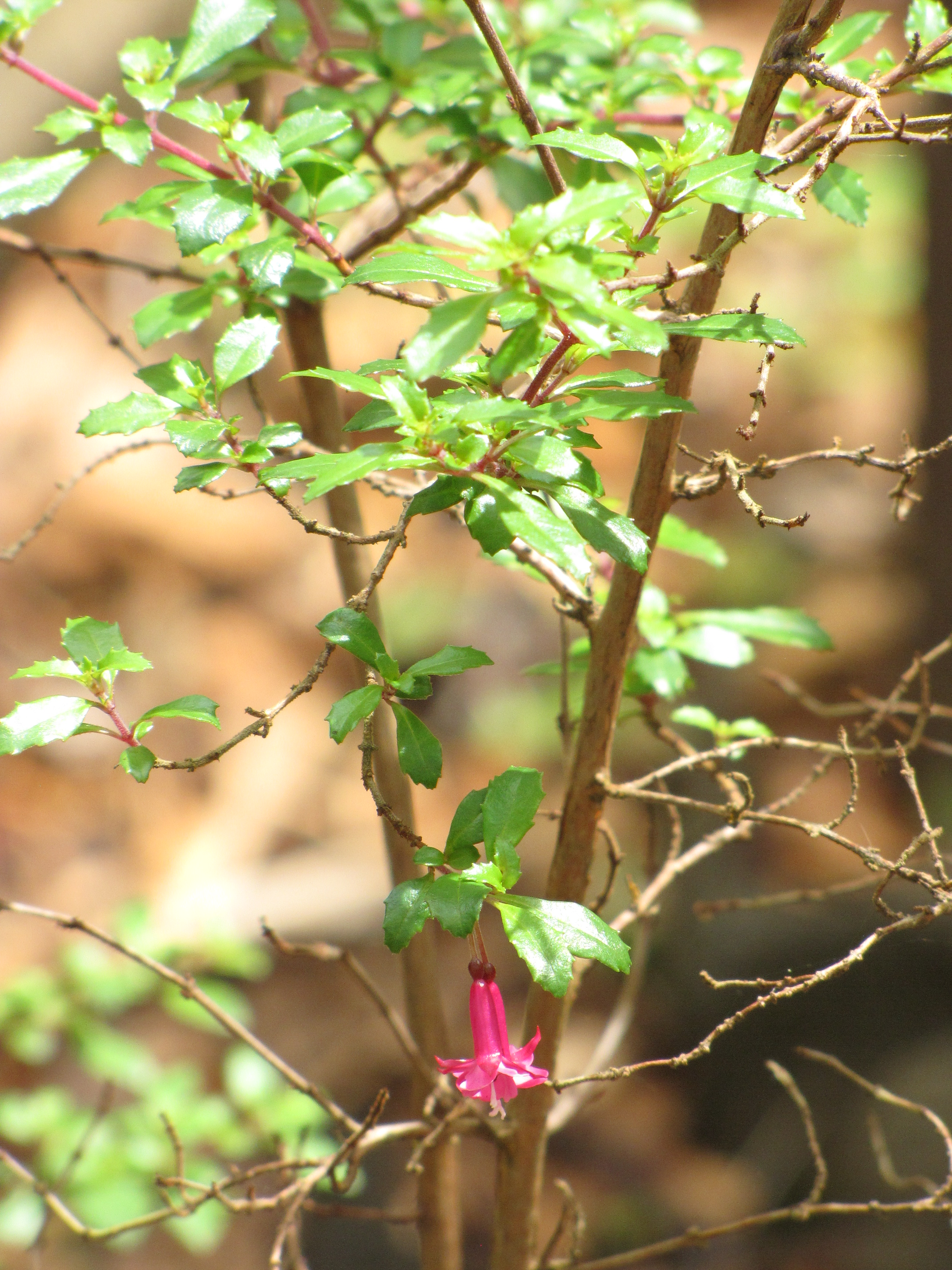
Erect Fuchsia microphylla plant

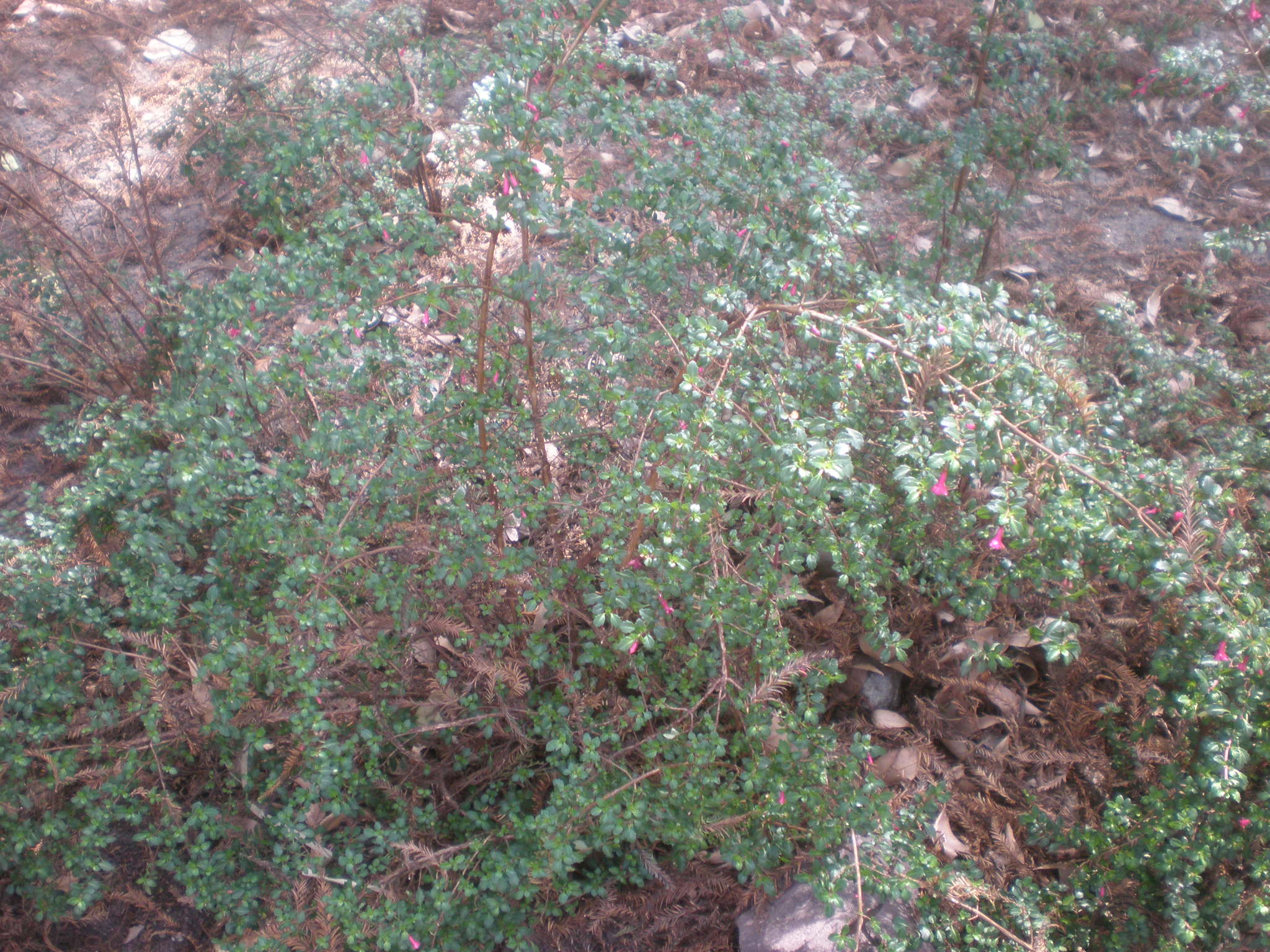
Fuchsia microphylla plant at the Botanical Garden of Bosque de Chapultepec, Mexico

== See also ==
- List of culinary fruits
- List of fuchsia diseases
