= C4H4O3 =

The molecular formula C_{4}H_{4}O_{3} (molar mass: 100.07 g/mol) may refer to:

- 5-Hydroxy-2(5H)-furanone
- Succinic anhydride
- Tetronic acid
