= Hydroxybutenolide =

Hydroxybutenolide may refer to:

- Tetronic acid (3-hydroxybutenolide)
- 5-Hydroxy-2(5H)-furanone (γ-hydroxybutenolide)
