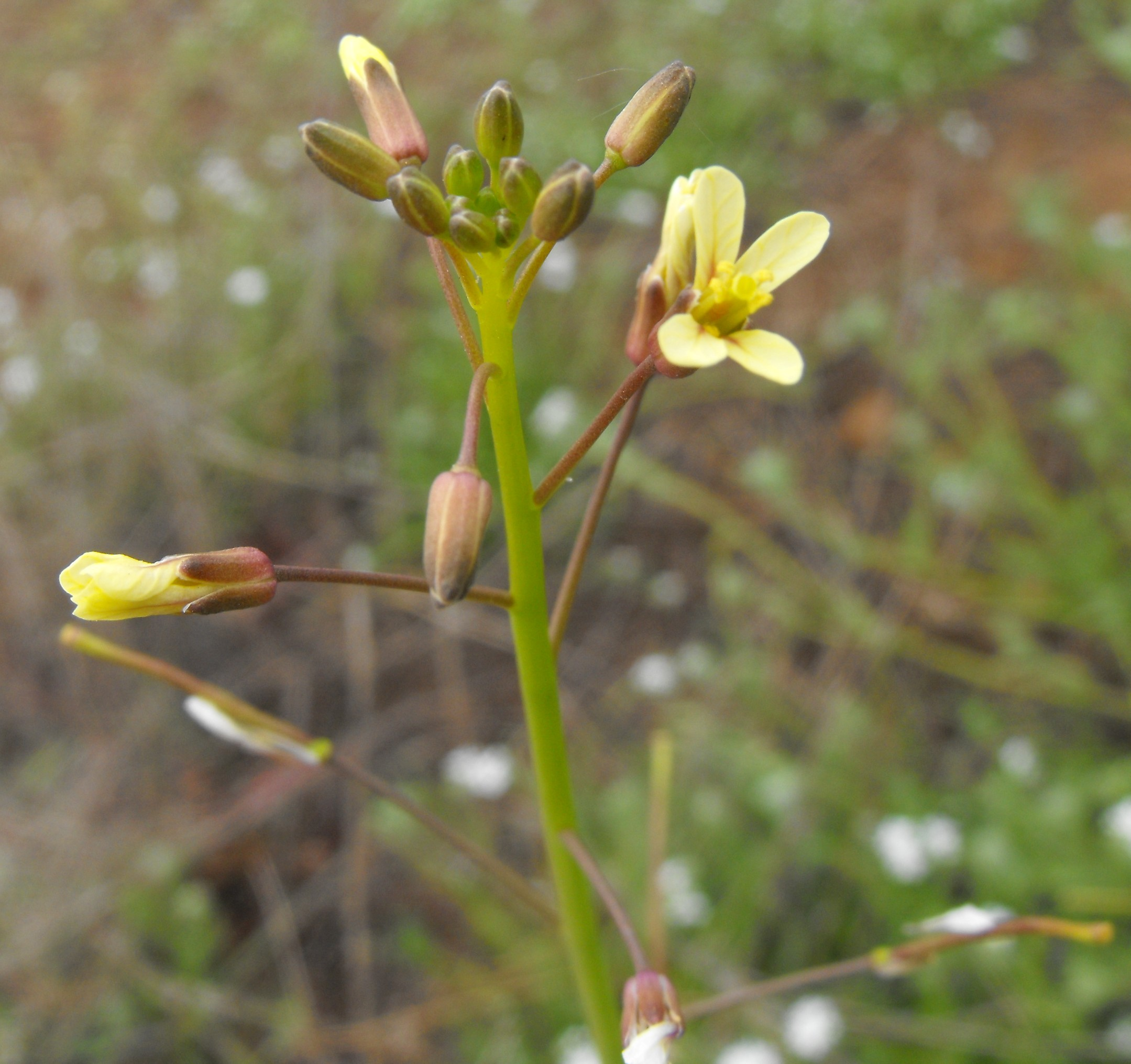

Scientific classification
- Kingdom: Plantae
- Clade: Embryophytes
- Clade: Tracheophytes
- Clade: Angiosperms
- Clade: Eudicots
- Clade: Rosids
- Order: Brassicales
- Family: Brassicaceae
- Genus: Brassica
- Species: B. tournefortii

Binomial name
- Brassica tournefortii Gouan.

= Brassica tournefortii =

Species of flowering plant

Brassica tournefortii is a species of plant known by the common names Asian mustard, pale cabbage, African mustard, Sahara mustard, and Aslooz.

Brassica tournefortii is also used in North African cuisine. In Libya, it is known as Aslooz (Arabic: عسلوز, romanized: ‘Asalūz) and is commonly incorporated into traditional dishes such as Couscous bil Aslooz.

It is also well known as an invasive species, particularly in California.

== Description ==
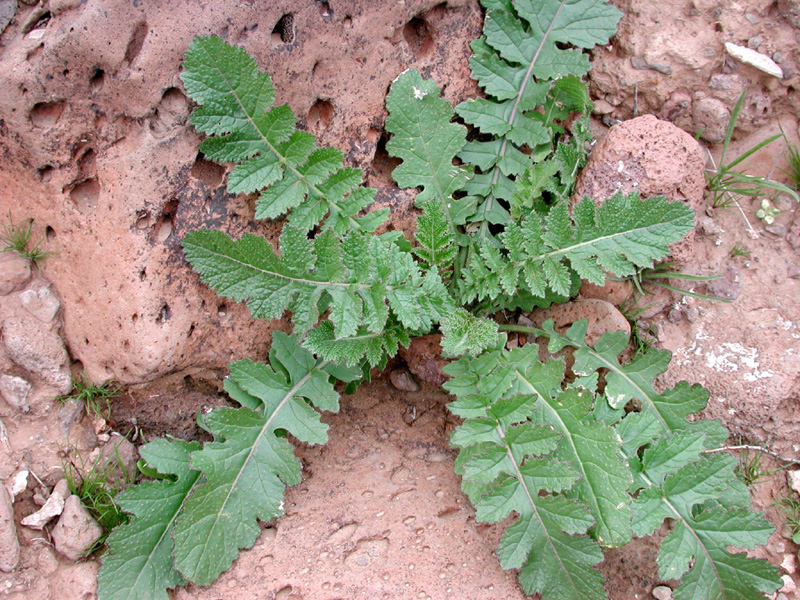
Leaves of B. tournefortii

The plant is generally similar to other mustards, but the yellow flowers are not as bright and flashy as closely related species. It is a spreading annual herb with long stems up to 100 centimetres (40 inches) in length.

== Distribution and habitat ==
This mustard is native to the deserts of North Africa and the Middle East. It became notorious during the twentieth century after it invaded the deserts of the United States and Mexico. Recently it has become an abundant weed of low deserts including the Sonoran and Mojave Deserts, plus the desert valleys such as the Coachella and Imperial Valleys of southern California. The plant disperses easily at the first hint of rain. When the seed coats are moistened they form a gel and become very sticky and readily adhere to people, animals, and objects. Seeds easily take hold along roadsides and arid desert lands, especially in disturbed habitats. The plant disperses 750 to 9,000 seeds which stay viable for several years in soil, contributing to its status as an invasive species.

== As an invasive species ==
Thick stands of the plant can crowd out native flora. Well-adapted to desert life, it monopolizes any moisture in the soil before other plants can get it and forms seeds before other species do. It is particularly an issue in desert farms when the land is tilled.

It produces seed as early in the year as January, especially if the region undergoes a warm spell, which is a common occurrence during southern California winters. It self-fertilizes and drops seeds into the soil, where they persist, survives fires, and long periods without rain. The fact that it propagates by leaving large numbers of viable seeds in the soil prevents eradication measures such as pulling, mowing, grazing and burning. Individual plants have the capacity to separate from the ground and become like tumbleweeds, dropping seeds as they are carried across the desert floor in the breeze.

=== Effects on flora ===
B. tourneforii outcompetes native plants and monopolizes resources before other plants can acquire them, effectively starving out the competition. The plant also inhibits growth of competition by exhibiting an allelopathic effect on surrounding plants, inhibiting their growth.

=== Controlling the species ===
Methods of control currently lack biological control, instead physical and preventative measures are taken. Studies are being done that suggests the plant may be controlled using allelopathic methods. One study suggests that there are two factors that affect the dormancy of B. tournefortii: one for the removal of the seed coat and another for darkness. The study showed that when the seed coat was removed using NaOCl and placed in dark conditions, germination was increased. This requirement for darkness indicates that B. tournefortii may be less of an issue in farmland where the ground is untilled.

The seeds of B. tournefortii are highly sensitive to certain germination stimulants released by burning vegetation, collectively known as karrikins. Duplication and subsequent evolution of genes encoding the karrikin receptor protein in the B. tournefortii genome is thought to contribute the increased sensitivity to karrikins. In turn, this trait may have enhanced this species' ability to invade after fire events. Control of this species may be improved by exploiting this trait through chemical stimulation of germination, with the aim of clearing the soil seed bank followed by herbicidal applications or physical removal.

=== Invasive range ===
B. tournefortii invades sandy soil, particularly deserts, notably in regions such as Southern California, Mexico, and Australia.

=== Economic impact ===
B. tournefortii occupies the 6th position in the national ranking in terms of revenue loss (AU$10.6 million) due to crop yield losses in Australia.
