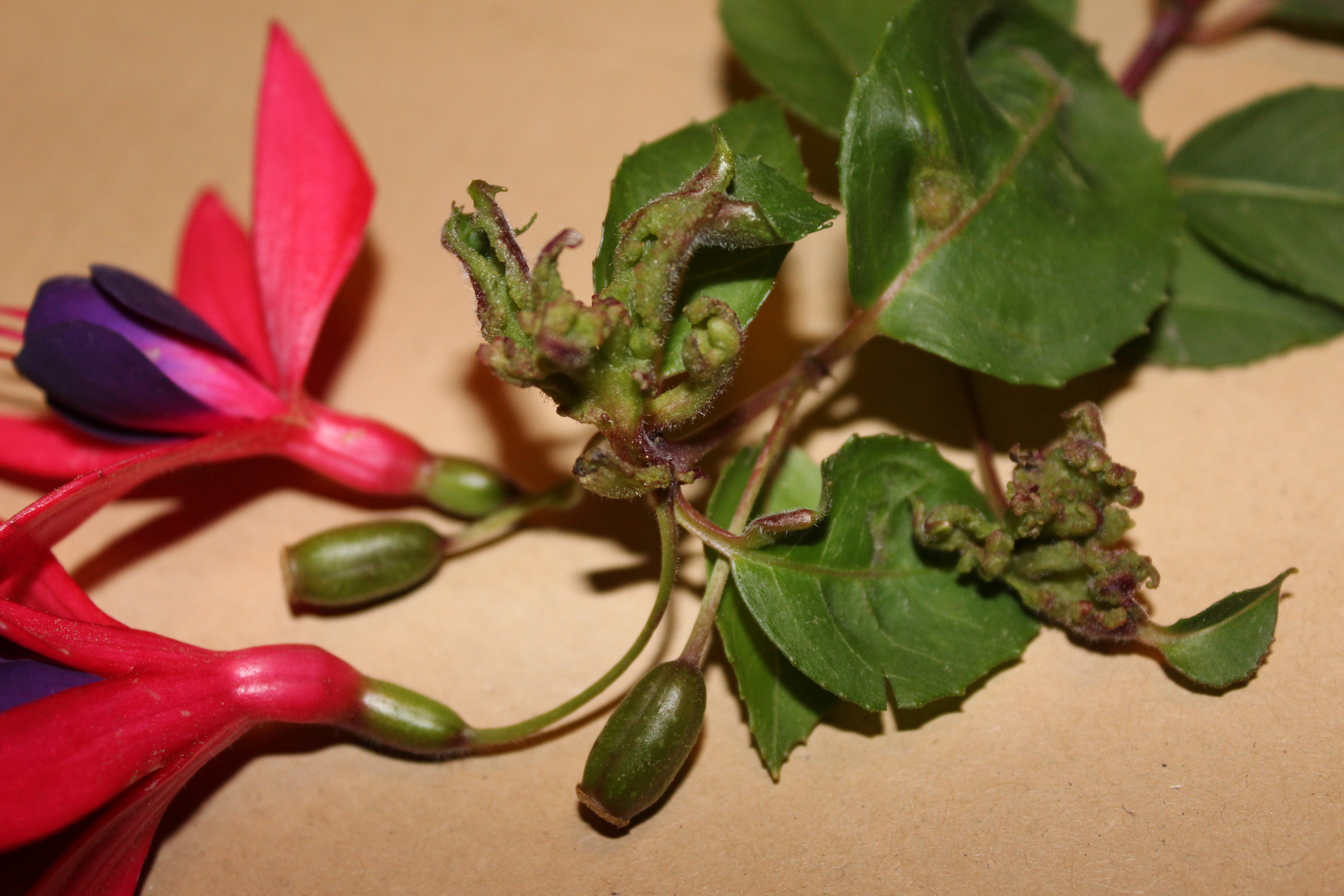
- Fuchsia shoot displaying gall mite infestation

Scientific classification
- Domain: Eukaryota
- Kingdom: Animalia
- Phylum: Arthropoda
- Subphylum: Chelicerata
- Class: Arachnida
- Family: Eriophyidae
- Genus: Aculops
- Species: A. fuchsiae

Binomial name
- Aculops fuchsiae Keifer, 1972

= Aculops fuchsiae =

Species of mite

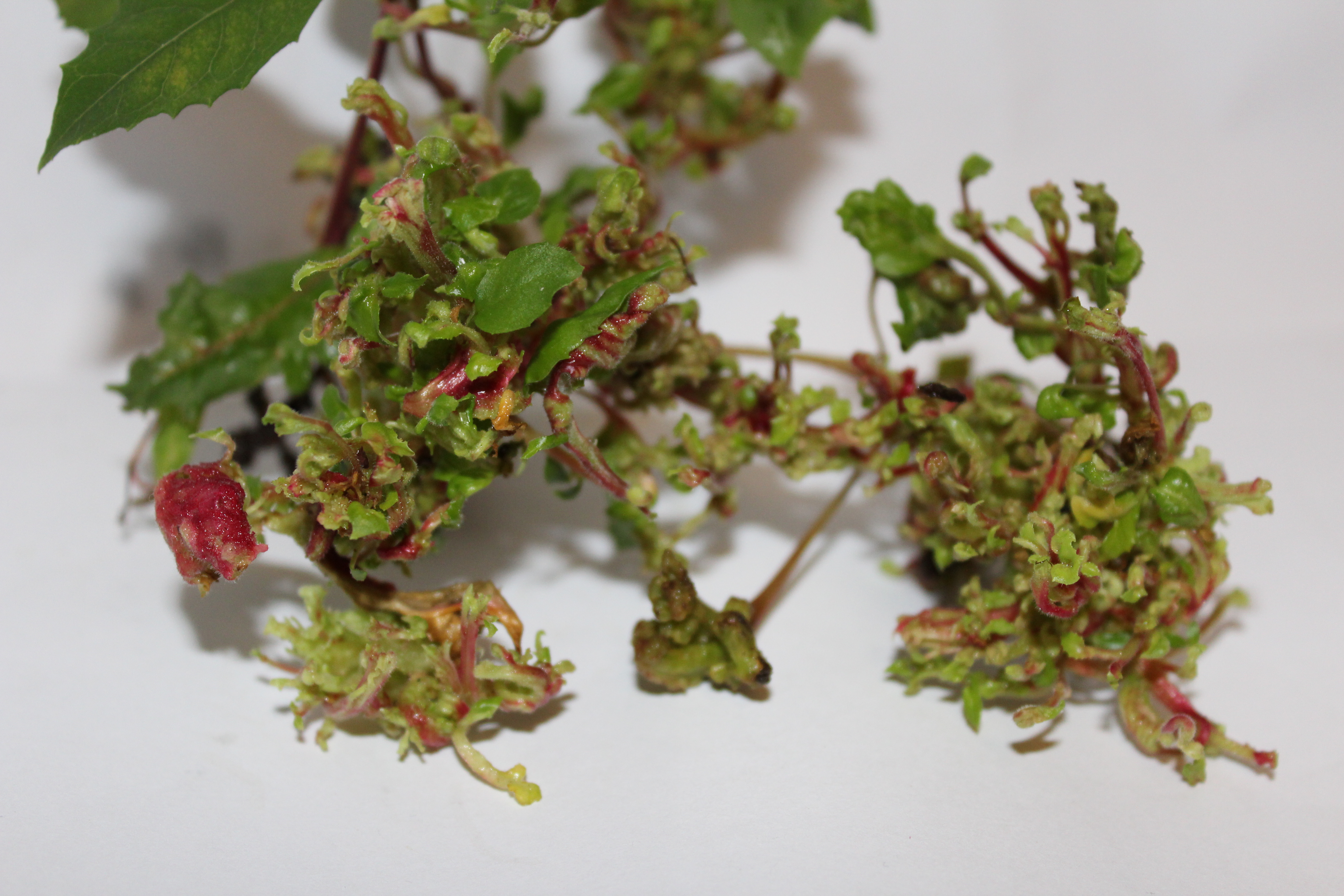
Fuchsia tissue showing extensive distortion due to A. fuchsiae infestation

Aculops fuchsiae, commonly known as fuchsia gall mite, is a species of mite in the family Eriophyidae. It feeds on Fuchsia plants, causing distortion of growing shoots and flowers. It is regarded as a horticultural pest.

== Description ==
Aculops fuchsiae is too small to be seen with the naked eye; female adult mites are between 200 and 250 micrometres (0.20 and 0.25 mm) long and 55 and 60 micrometres (0.055 and 0.060 mm) wide, with males slightly smaller. It is white or pale yellow in colour and has a wormlike or spindle-like body shape, with two anterior (front) pairs of legs.

== Biology ==
Aculops fuchsiae is host specific and the only eriophyid mite known to attack Fuchsia. It feeds on the shoot tips, where it sucks sap. It produces chemicals that interfere with the plant's normal growth, which instead becomes a distorted mass of reddish-pink or yellowish green tissue. There are several generations between late spring and autumn; the life cycle takes about 21 days at 18°C. There are four life stages: egg, larva, nymph and adult. Eggs take between 4 and 7 days to hatch at 18°C, and females lay up to 50 eggs at one time. The mite's cold tolerance is not known; it may remain active over winter if temperatures are high enough, though in cooler areas overwintering occurs beneath bud scales. The Northwest Fuchsia Society states that mites in the Pacific Northwest of the USA may have been killed by −6 °C (21 °F) occurring over 3 to 4 nights, though outdoor mite populations in southern England appear to have survived winters with prolonged periods below 0 °C (32 °F). Colonization of new Fuchsia plants occurs either by the mites being blown by wind or via hitching rides on insects and other animals, such as hummingbirds travelling between plants.

== Distribution ==
This mite was discovered in 1971 on Fuchsia species in São Paulo, Brazil, and was first described the following year. It was introduced into California in 1981 and quickly colonised the south of the state from its introduction site near San Francisco. According to the United Kingdom's Food and Environment Research Agency, it is likely the mite was introduced into Europe in 2001/2002 on Fuchsia cuttings illegally brought from South America by a Jersey-based Fuchsia enthusiast. In 2002 it was seen at the Festival de Trévarez in Brittany, on a plant brought in by a private collector of Fuchsia, and in December 2003 it was identified at eight sites in Brittany. In 2006 the mite was identified as present on the Channel Islands, and in 2007 it was found in two private gardens in southern England, where it has since been discovered in several locations.

== Ecology ==
Fuchsia species and cultivars vary in their susceptibility to gall mite infestation; although all Fuchsia can host the mite, some appear to show less damage as a result. Trials and prevalence of the mite so far suggest that species and cultivars in the Schufia and Encliandra taxonomic Fuchsia groups, native to Central America, appear to be resistant, whereas those in the Quelusia and Procumbentes groups appear to be susceptible. The most susceptible species include Fuchsia magellanica, F. coccinea and F. procumbens. Slightly less susceptible are F. denticulata, F. gehrigeri, F. macrophylla and F. triphylla. Resistant species include F. microphylla (and F. microphylla subsp. hidalgensis), F. thymifolia, F. venusta, F. boliviana, F. minutiflora, F. radicans and F. tincta. Sources disagree about the status of F. arborescens; it is considered either very susceptible, fairly susceptible or resistant.

== Horticultural pest ==
Fuchsia tissue becomes so distorted as a result of gall mite infestation that affected plants fail to produce normal growth and flowers, which seriously impacts their horticultural amenity value. The mites are resistant to chemical treatments, because once symptoms are visible, the mites have already entered leaf and flower buds, which afford them protection. Products that contain abamectin or spirodiclofen provide some control, though repeated applications at four-day intervals may be necessary to break the mite life cycle. Insecticidal soap and horticultural oils can also be used, and acephate may provide control on susceptible Fuchsia cultivars. Some mites can be removed from plants by cutting off distorted tissue, though regrowth is likely to be recolonised. Trials in California showed that the best control was achieved by combining the removal of tissue with pesticide application. The options for biological control are also limited, though the predatory mite Amblyseius californicus might depress fuchsia gall mite populations.

Fuchsia cultivars that have been listed as being resistant or less susceptible to gall mite damage include 'Baby Chang', 'Chance Encounter', 'Cinnabarina', 'Englander', 'Golden West', 'Isis', 'Mendocino'/'Mendocino Mini', 'Miniature Jewels', 'Ocean Mist', 'Space Shuttle' and 'Voodoo'. Resistant species are listed in the ecology section above.
