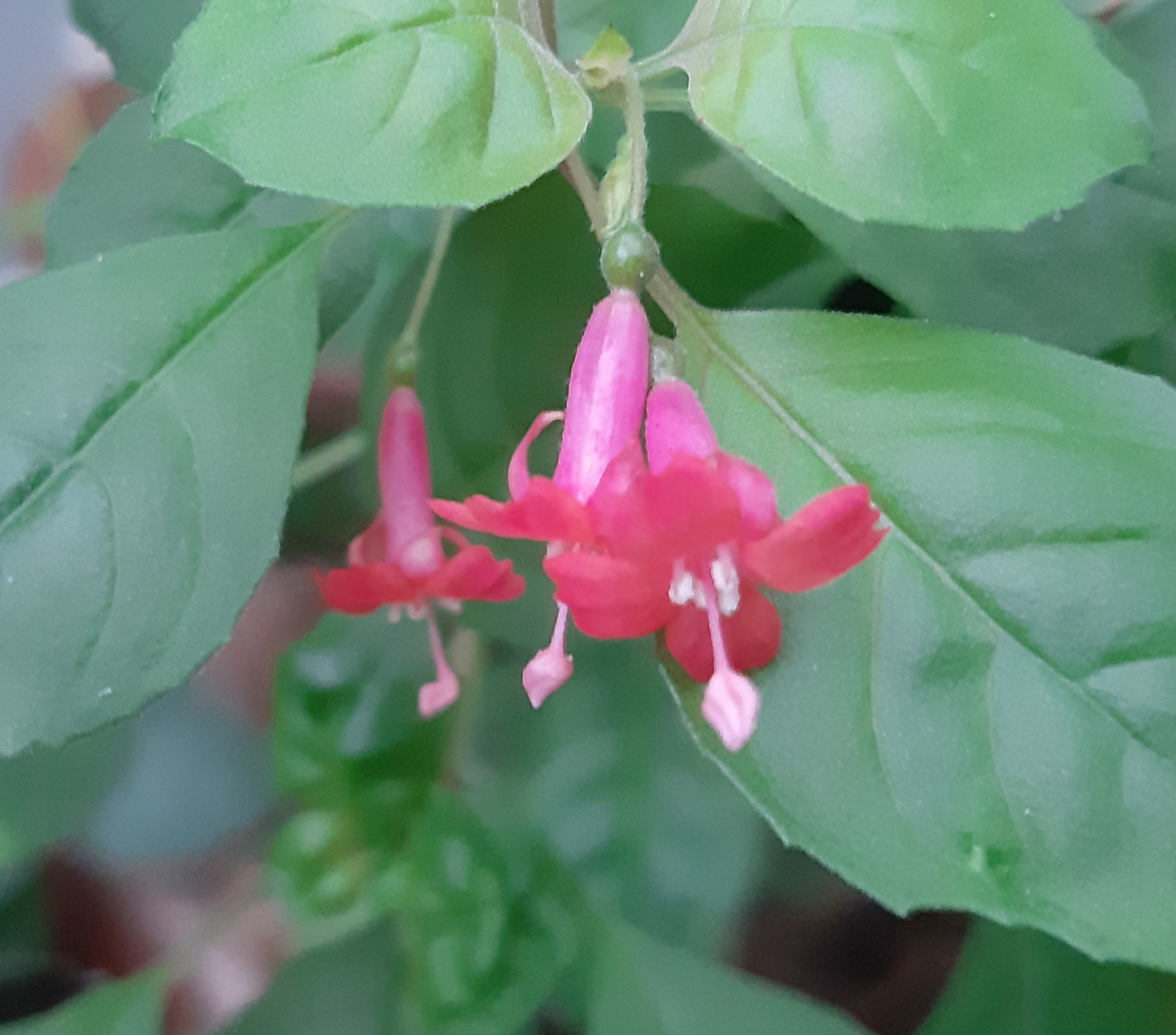

Scientific classification
- Kingdom: Plantae
- Clade: Tracheophytes
- Clade: Angiosperms
- Clade: Eudicots
- Clade: Rosids
- Order: Myrtales
- Family: Onagraceae
- Genus: Fuchsia
- Species: F. × bacillaris

Binomial name
- Fuchsia × bacillaris Lindl.

= Fuchsia × bacillaris =

Nothospecies of plant

Fuchsia × bacillaris is a natural hybrid between F. microphylla subsp. microphylla and F. thymifolia subsp. thymifolia. It was originally described by John Lindley in 1832. It is native to Mexico, including the states of Mexico, Oaxaca, and Puebla.
