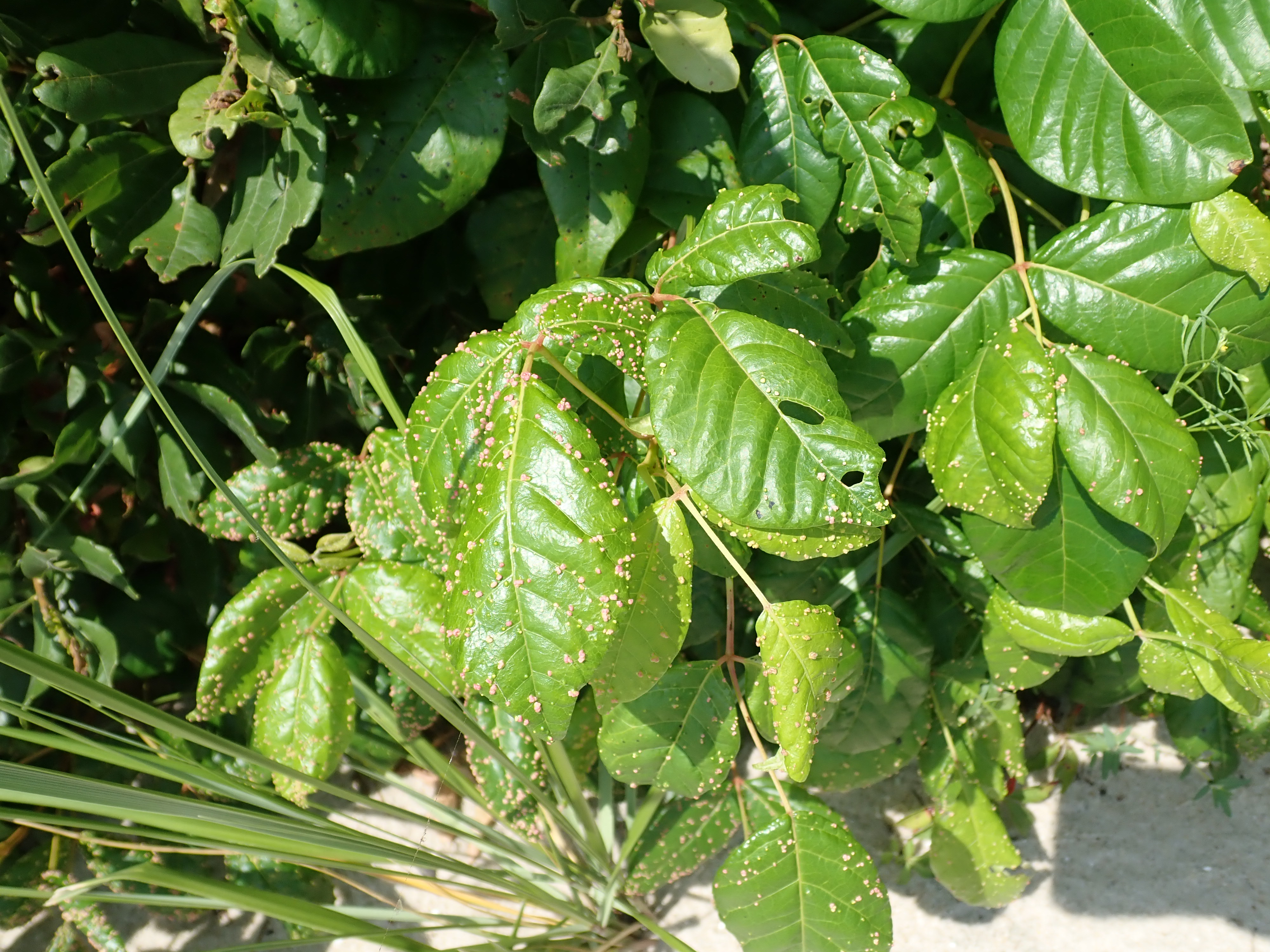
- Aculops rhois galls on poison ivy

Scientific classification
- Domain: Eukaryota
- Kingdom: Animalia
- Phylum: Arthropoda
- Subphylum: Chelicerata
- Class: Arachnida
- Family: Eriophyidae
- Genus: Aculops
- Species: A. rhois

Binomial name
- Aculops rhois (Stebbins, 1909)

= Aculops rhois =

Species of mite

Aculops rhois, the poison ivy gall mite, is a species of Eriophyid mite found in North America. They form galls in poison ivy as well as other members of North American Toxicodendron and some species of Rhus (including fragrant sumac).

== Identification ==
Poison ivy gall mites form small red pouch galls on the upper surface of the leaves of their host. The mites themselves are extremely small and are usually found in the interior of the pouch (on the underside). The bright coloration they create in their host plant, however, makes this species fairly conspicuous and easy to detect compared to other members of Aculops (such as Aculops ailanthii in trees-of-heaven). Due to this, this species is one of the more widely reported species in its genus although like many of its relatives it is still poorly known.

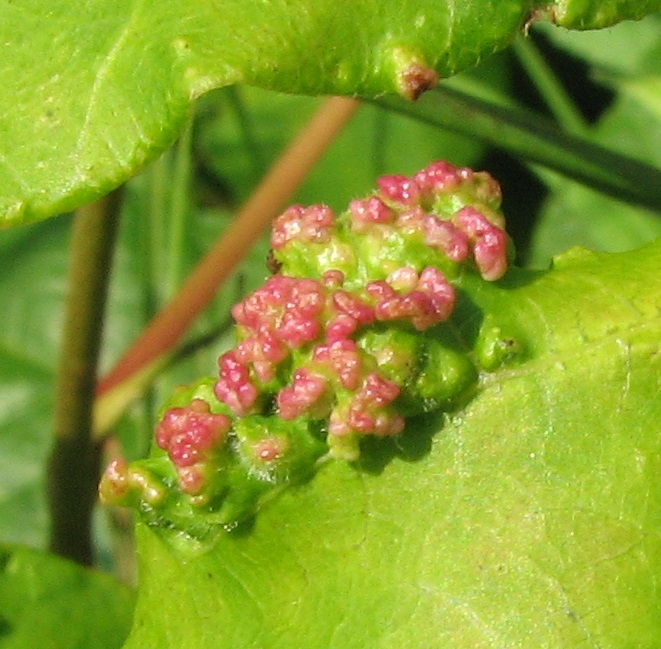
Closeup of the galls formed by A. rhois
