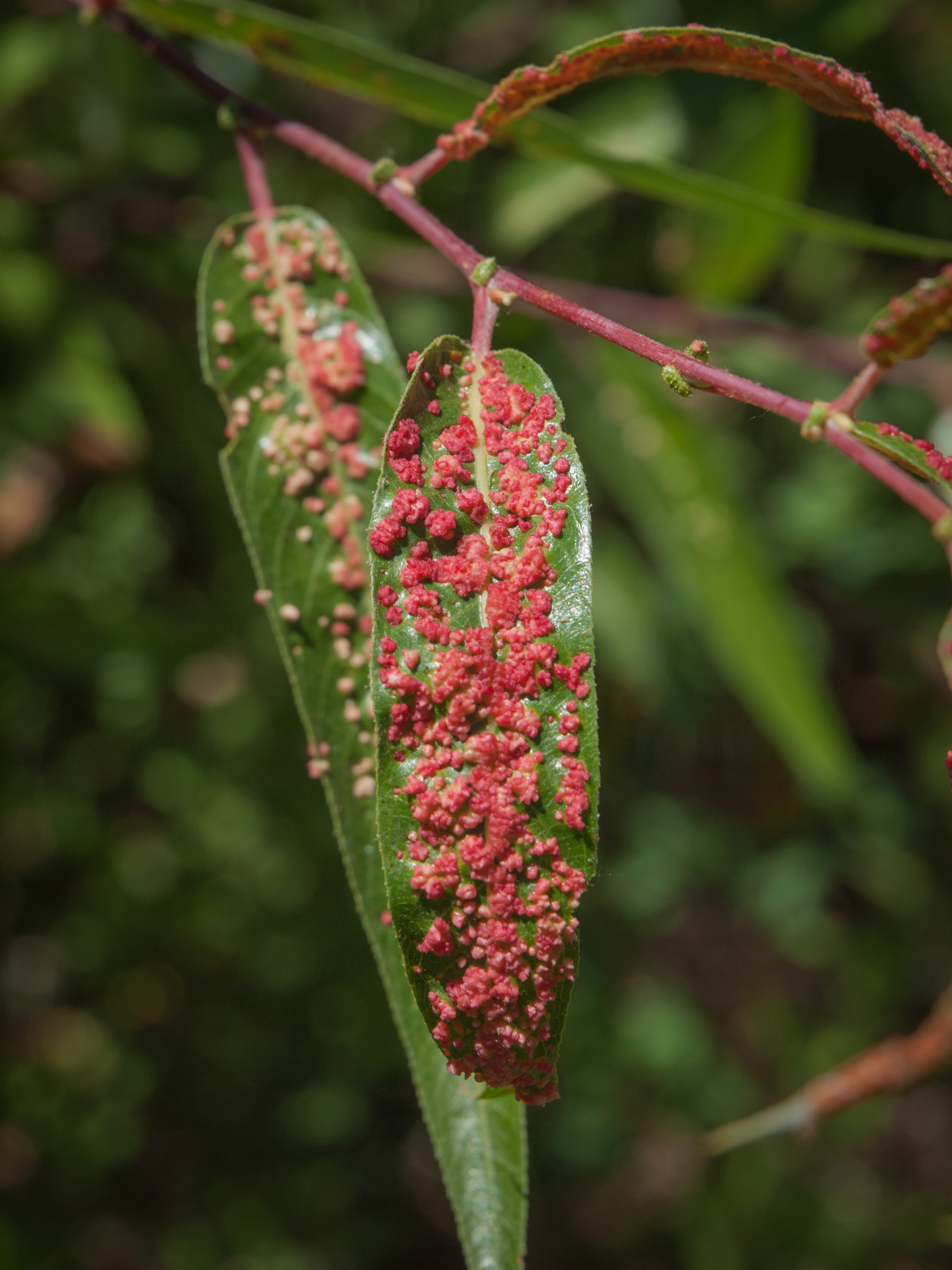
- Willow gall mite (Aculops tetanothrix) on arroyo willow (Salix lasiolepis) Cache Creek, Bear Valley, CA

Scientific classification
- Domain: Eukaryota
- Kingdom: Animalia
- Phylum: Arthropoda
- Subphylum: Chelicerata
- Class: Arachnida
- Family: Eriophyidae
- Genus: Aculops; Keifer, 1966

Species
- Around 200 species see text

Synonyms
- Pedaculops Manson, 1984

= Aculops =

Aculops Temporal range: Palaeogene–present

Genus of mites

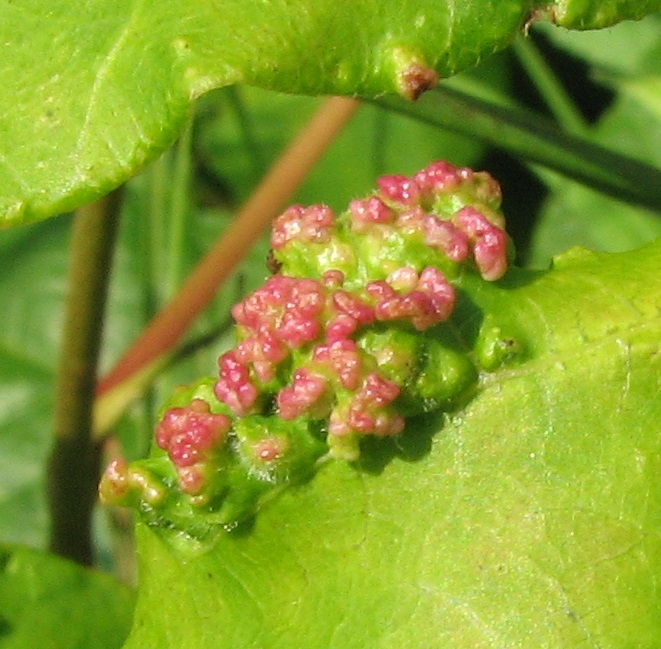
Galls of Aculops rhois on poison ivy

Aculops is a genus of parasitic plant mites in the family Eriophyidae.

Some species, such as Aculops lycopersici, are prolific crop and ornamental pests. Aculops ailanthii is being considered as biocontrol for the extremely invasive Ailanthus altissima in North America.

Very little is known about the genus, with new species frequently being discovered, such as in New Zealand.

== Selected species ==
- Aculops ailanthii (Lin-Fuping, Jin-Changle & Kuang-Haiyua, 1997) - ailanthus leafcurl mite
- Aculops cannabicola (Farkas, 1960) – hemp russet mite
- Aculops fuchsiae (Keifer, 1972) – fuchsia gall mite
- Aculops lycopersici (Massee, 1937) – tomato russet mite
- Aculops rhois (Stebbins, 1909) - poison ivy gall mite
- Aculops tetanothrix (Nalepa, 1889) – willow gall mite
