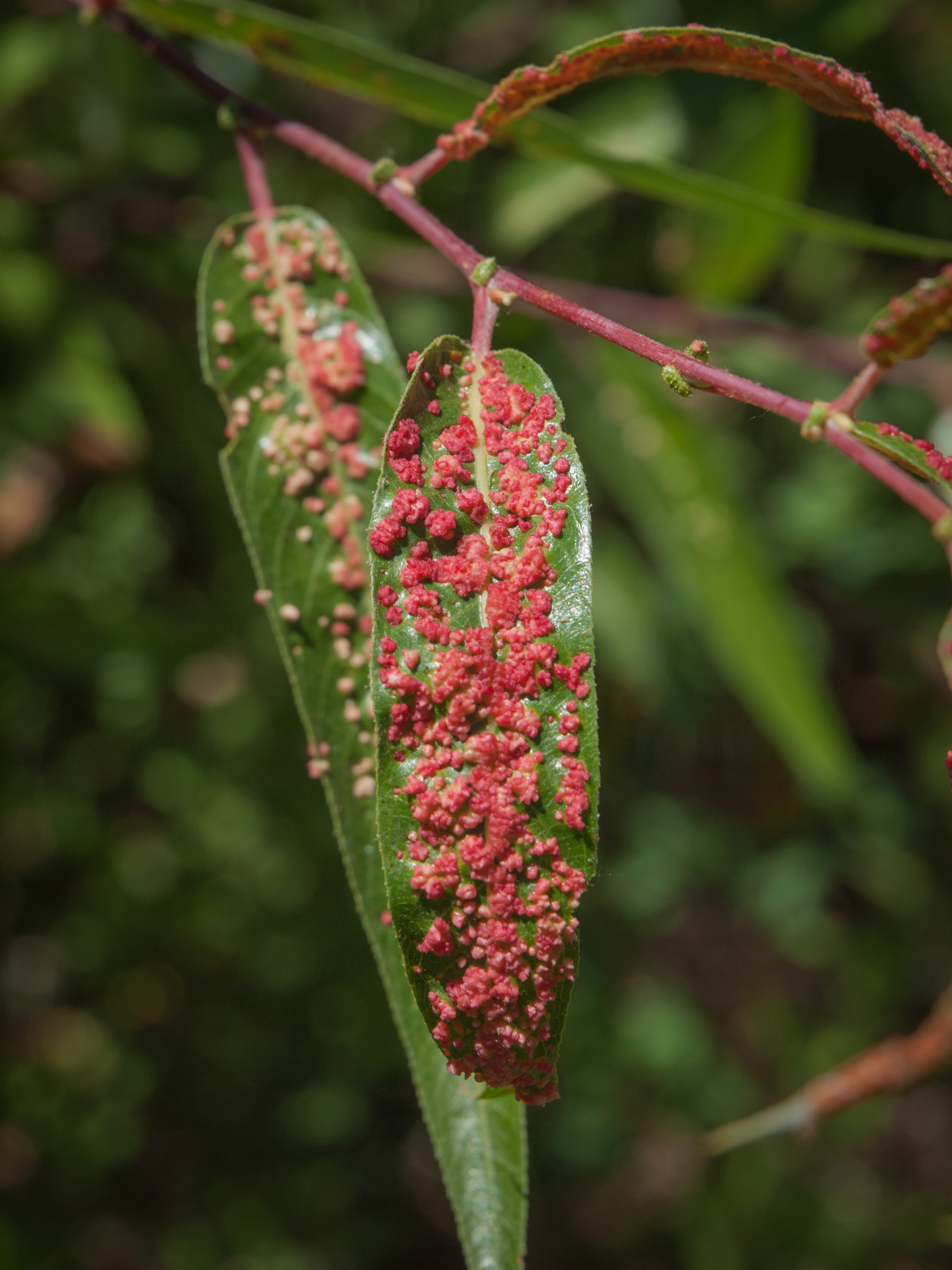
- Aculops tetanothrix on a Salix specimen.

Scientific classification
- Domain: Eukaryota
- Kingdom: Animalia
- Phylum: Arthropoda
- Subphylum: Chelicerata
- Class: Arachnida
- Family: Eriophyidae
- Genus: Aculops
- Species: A. tetanothrix

Binomial name
- Aculops tetanothrix (Nalepa, 1889)

= Aculops tetanothrix =

Species of mite

Aculops tetanothrix, also known as the willow gall mite, is a species of mite that belongs to the family Eriophydae. The mite is yellow, with brown or sometimes orange.

Aculops tetanothrix creates galls on Salix (willow) species. The galls initially are green, and later turn red.
