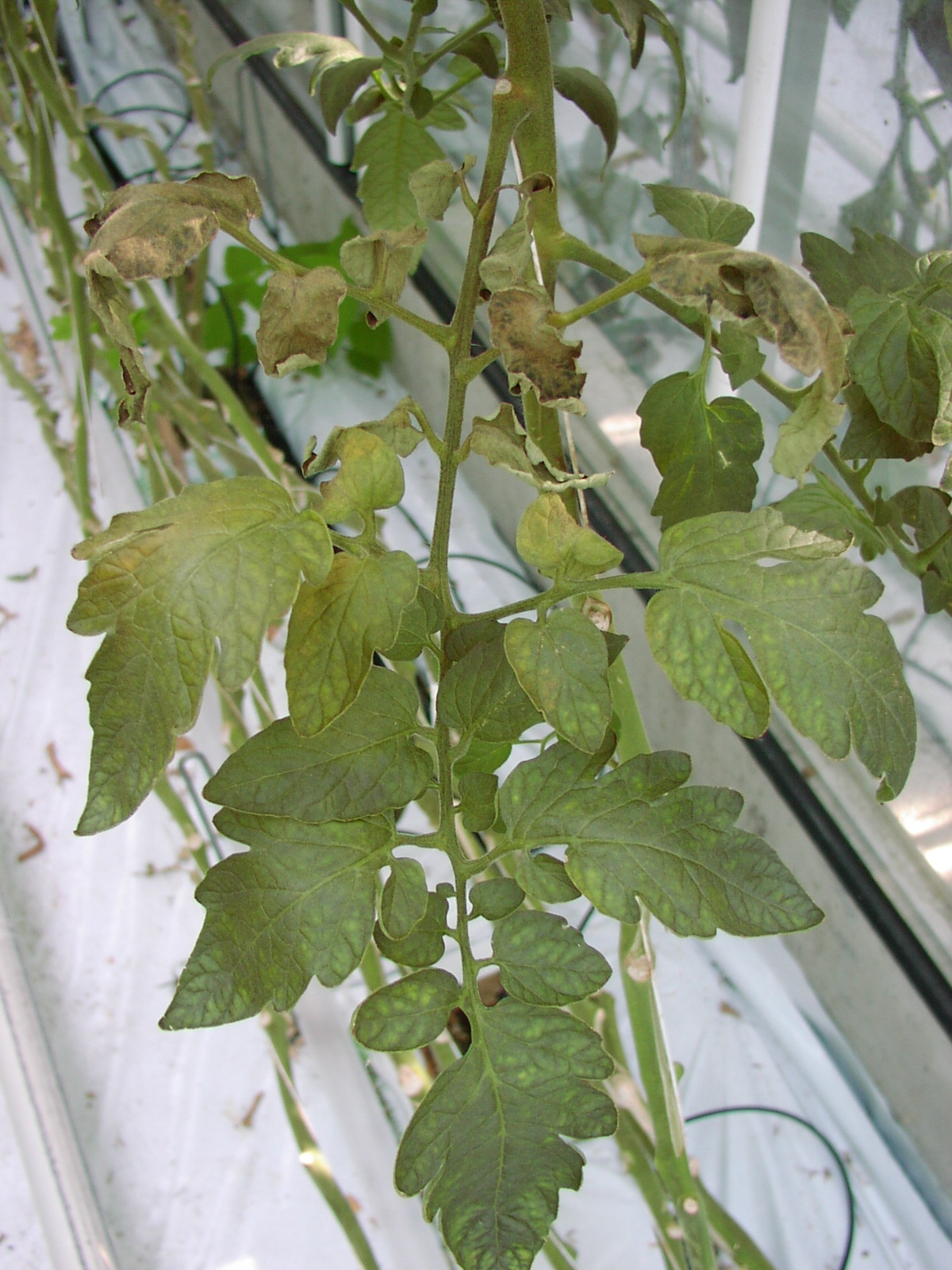

Scientific classification
- Domain: Eukaryota
- Kingdom: Animalia
- Phylum: Arthropoda
- Subphylum: Chelicerata
- Class: Arachnida
- Family: Eriophyidae
- Genus: Aculops
- Species: A. lycopersici

Binomial name
- Aculops lycopersici (A.M.Massee, 1937)

= Aculops lycopersici =

Species of mite

Aculops lycopersici, also known as the tomato russet mite, is a species of mite that belongs to the family Eriophyidae.

Aculops lycopersici is an important pest of tomato plants. It was first described by A. M. Massee in 1937 in Australia, but is now common around the world.

Its genome has been sequenced and is only 32.5 Mb.

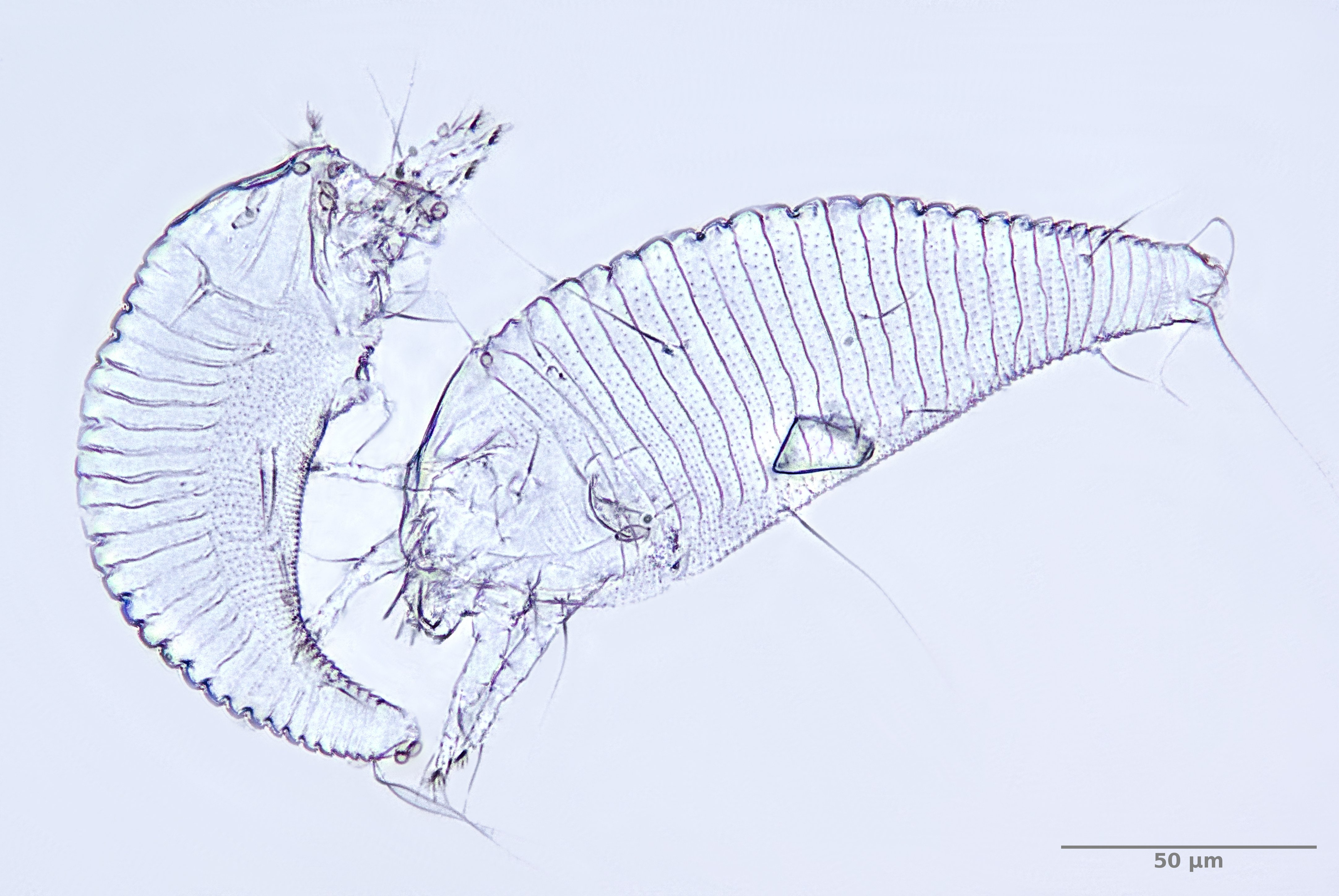

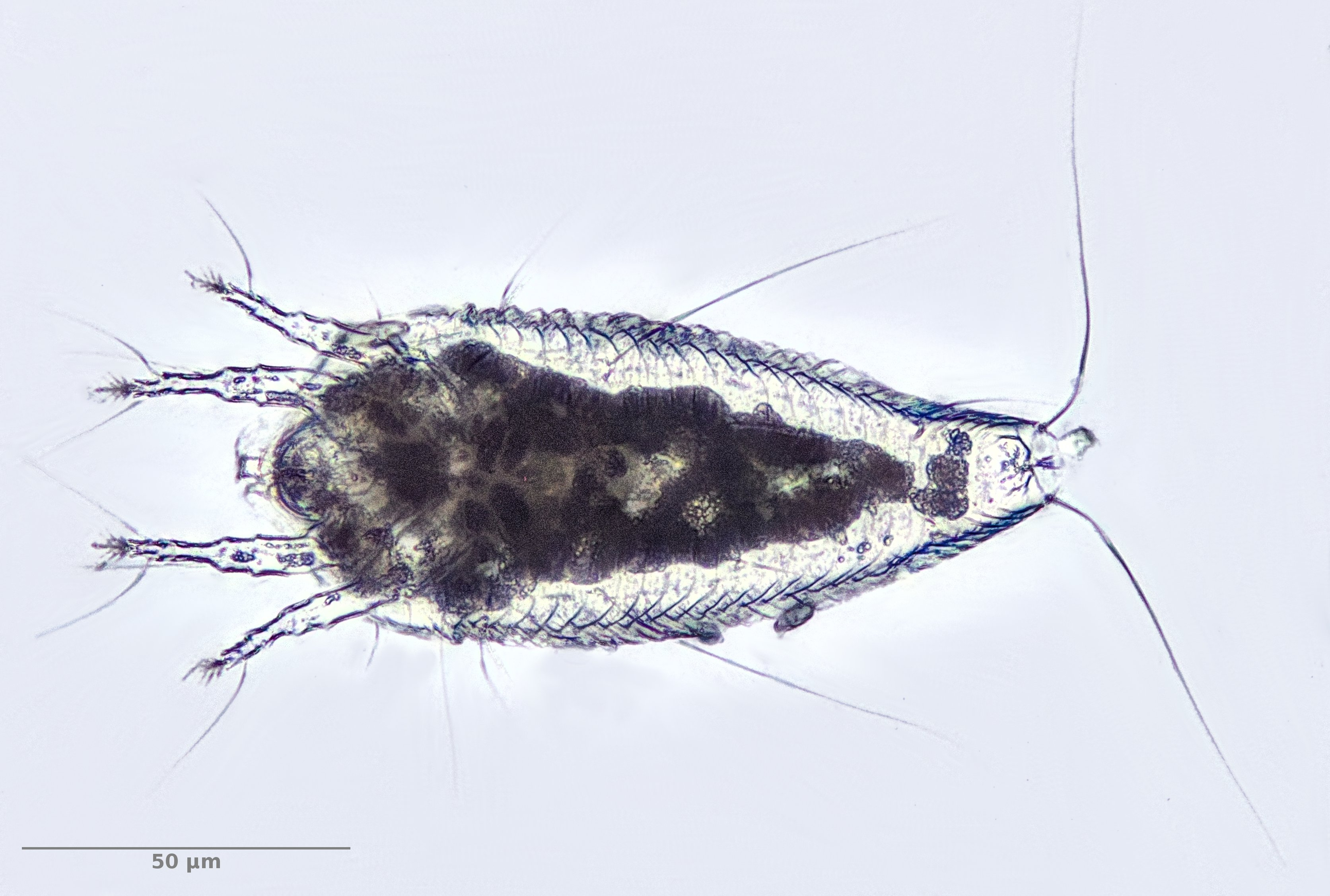

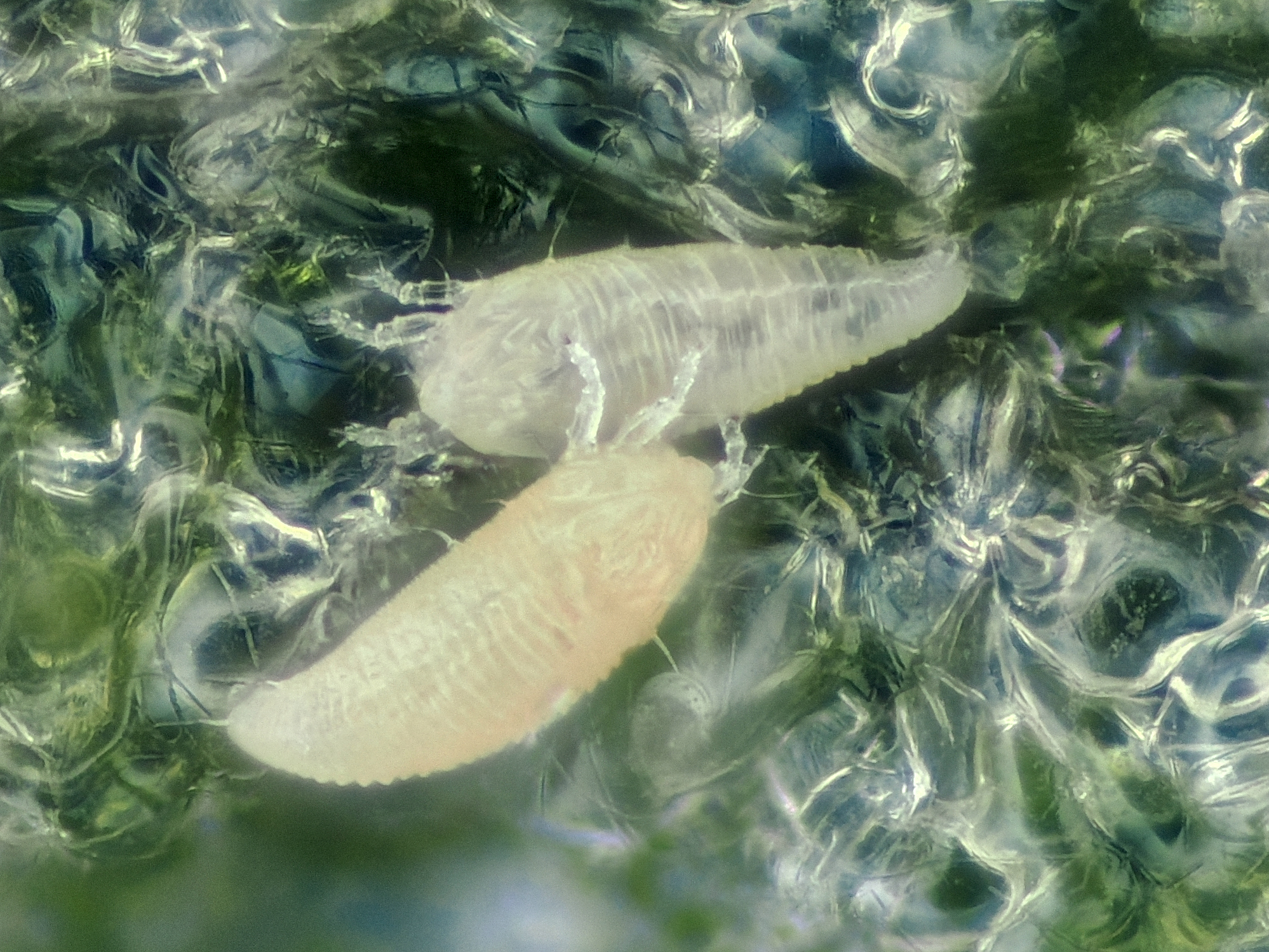

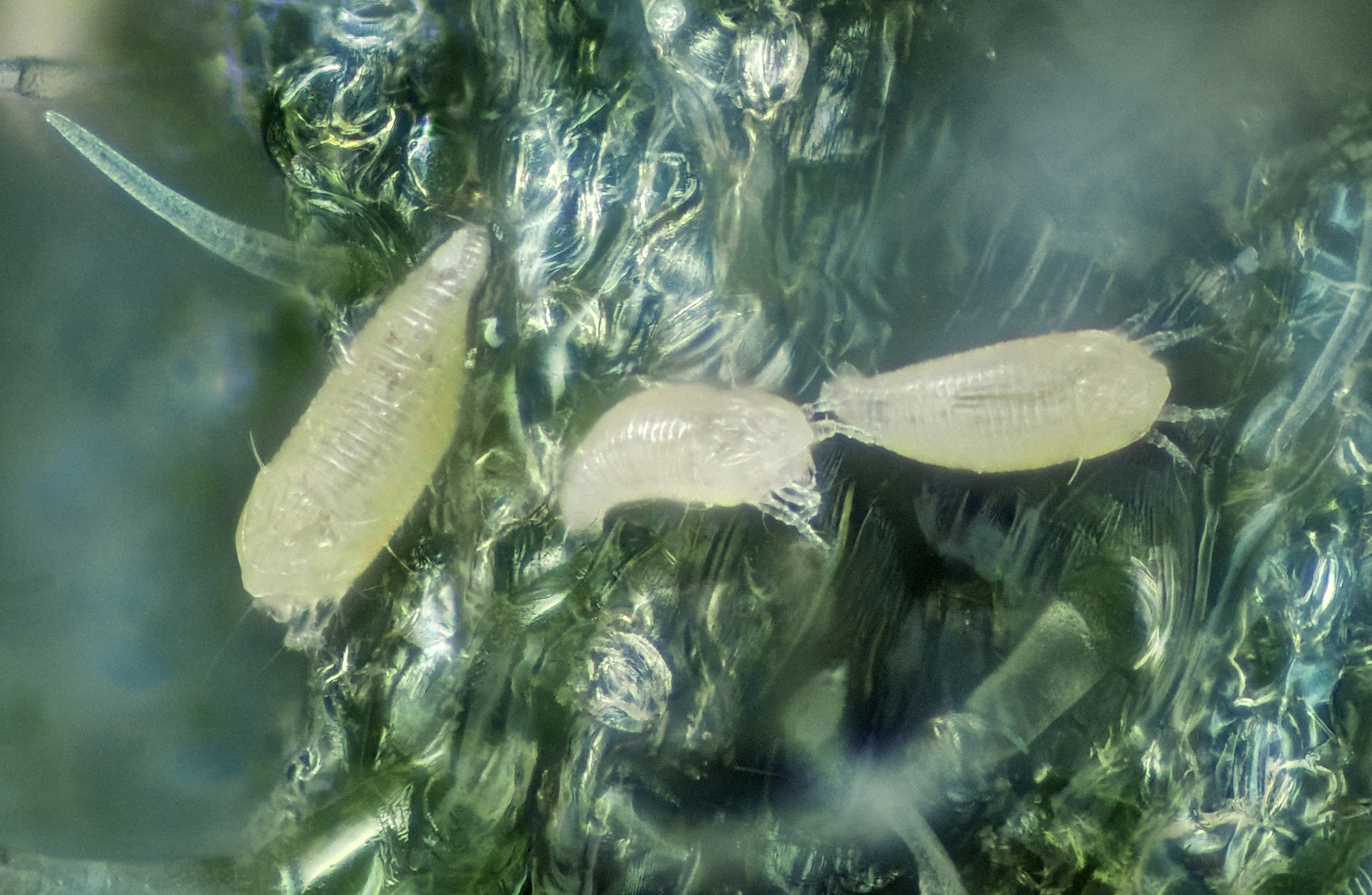
