= 5-Hydroxy-2(5H)-furanone =

- 5-Hydroxy-2(5H)-furanone

Names
- Preferred IUPAC name 5-Hydroxyfuran-2(5H)-one
- Other names 5-Hydroxy-5H-furan-2-one, 2-Hydroxyfuranone-(5), β-oxo-γ-butyrolactone, 4-Oxobut-2-enoic acid, 2,5-dihydrofuran-2-one, beta-Formylacrylic acid lactol, 2-Oxo-5-hydroxy-2,5-dihydrofuran, 2-Hydroxy-2,5-dihydro-5-furanone, 5-Hydroxy-2,5-dihydrofuran-2-one; γ-Hydroxybutenolide

Identifiers
CAS Number	14032-66-7
3D model (JSmol)	Interactive image
ChemSpider	19821
ECHA InfoCard	100.112.891
PubChem CID	21076
CompTox Dashboard (EPA)	DTXSID10930763
- InChI: InChI=1S/C4H4O3/c5-3-1-2-4(6)7-3/h1-3,5H Key: DUAZKLYNTLDKQK-UHFFFAOYSA-N
- SMILES: C1=CC(=O)OC1O

Properties
Chemical formula	C_{4}H_{4}O_{3}
Molar mass	100.073 g·mol^{−1}
Density	1.503 g/mL
Melting point	55 °C
- Except where otherwise noted, data are given for materials in their standard state (at 25 °C [77 °F], 100 kPa). Infobox references

5-Hydroxy-2(5H)-furanone is a furanone derived from oxidation of furfural using singlet oxygen. This oxidation is carried out generally in methanol or ethanol with a sensitizer like methylene blue or Rose bengal. The mechanism of this reaction is depicted as below.

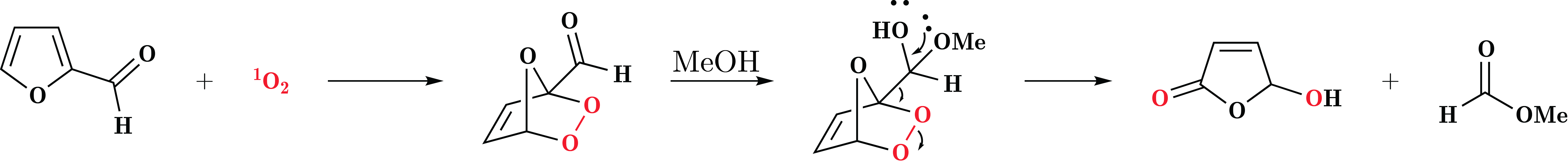

== Uses ==
5-Hydroxy-2(5H)-furanone is a potent pesticide and a four carbon building block for various heterocycles.

== Chemical properties ==
5-Hydroxy-2(5H)-furanone exists in chemical equilibrium with its isomer, cis-β-formylacrylic acid, in ring-chain tautomerism:

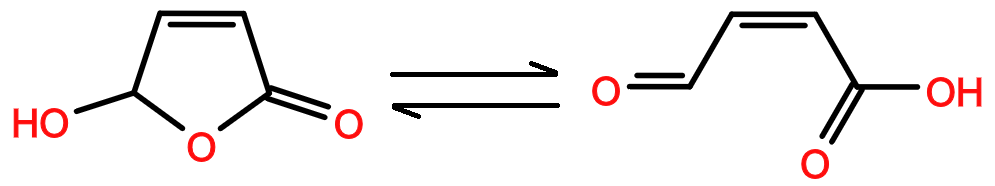

Under some conditions the compound will isomerize into succinic anhydride. Upon heating in strongly basic solution (pH > 9) this isomer will hydrate to succinic acid.

== See also ==
- Butenolide
- Tetronic acid
