= 2-Furanone =

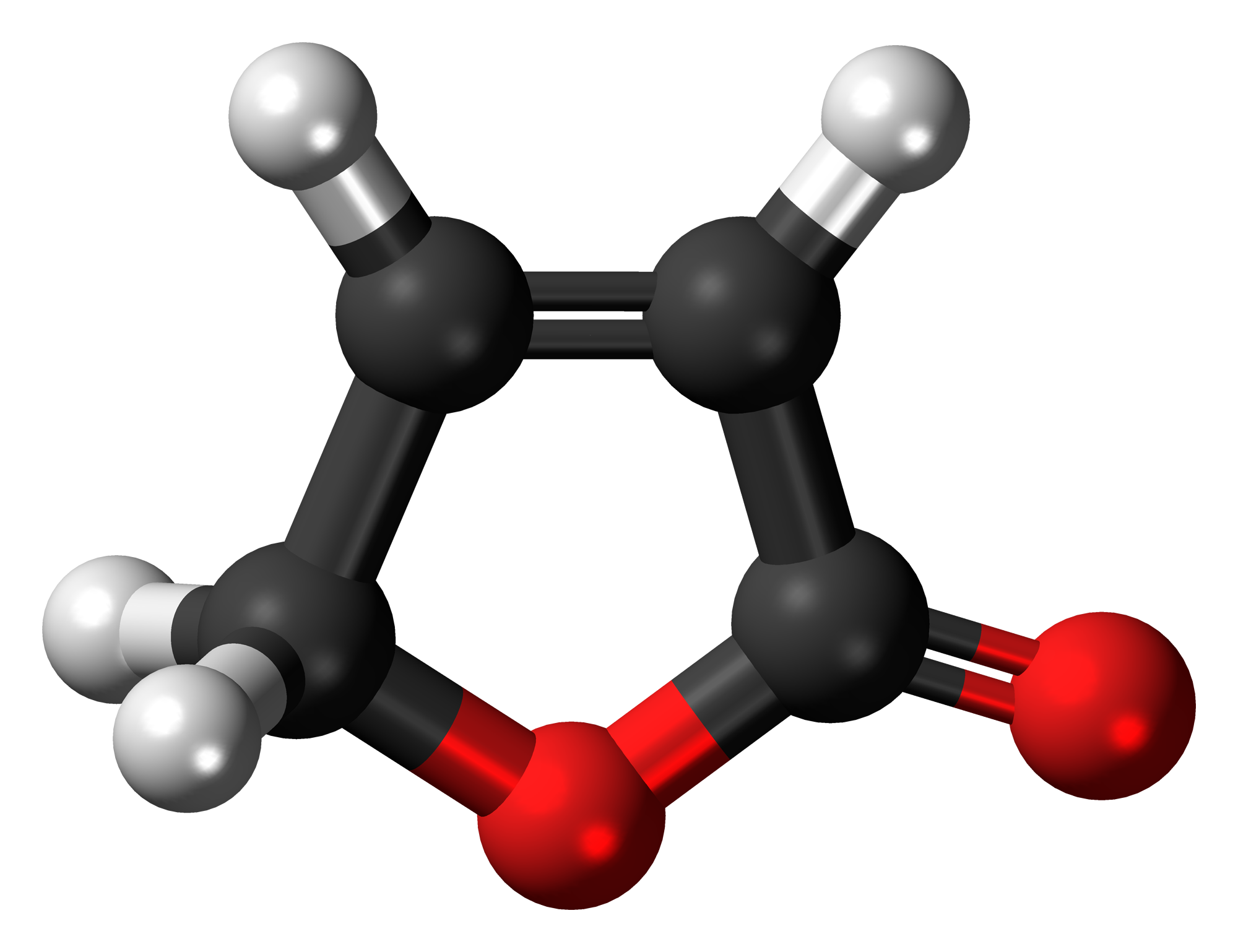

Names
- Preferred IUPAC name Furan-2(5H)-one
- Other names Furan-2-one, γ-crotonolactone, butenolide, 5H-furan-2-one

Identifiers
| CAS Number | 497-23-4 |
| 3D model (JSmol) | Interactive image |
| Beilstein Reference | 383585 |
| ChEBI | CHEBI:38118 |
| ChEMBL | ChEMBL166223 |
| ChemSpider | 9917 |
| ECHA InfoCard | 100.007.128 |
| EC Number | 207-839-3 |
| Gmelin Reference | 773828 |
| KEGG | C17601 |
| MeSH | butenolide |
| PubChem CID | 10341 |
| UNII | 8KXK25H388 |
| CompTox Dashboard (EPA) | DTXSID7075422 |
- InChI: InChI=1S/C4H4O2/c5-4-2-1-3-6-4/h1-2H,3H2 Key: VIHAEDVKXSOUAT-UHFFFAOYSA-N; InChI=1/C4H4O2/c5-4-2-1-3-6-4/h1-2H,3H2 Key: VIHAEDVKXSOUAT-UHFFFAOYAD
- SMILES: O=C\1OC/C=C/1

Properties
| Chemical formula | C_{4}H_{4}O_{2} |
| Molar mass | 84.07336 |
| Density | 1.185 g/cm^{3}, liquid |
| Melting point | 4 to 5 °C (39 to 41 °F; 277 to 278 K) |
| Boiling point | 86 to 87 °C (187 to 189 °F; 359 to 360 K) 12 mm Hg |
- Except where otherwise noted, data are given for materials in their standard state (at 25 °C [77 °F], 100 kPa). verify (what is ?) Infobox references

2-Furanone is a heterocyclic organic compound. It is also known as γ-crotonolactone (GCL), as it is formally the lactone derived from γ-hydroxyisocrotonic acid. The chemical is colloquially called "butenolide", and is the parent structure for the butenolide class of compounds. It is a colourless liquid.

== Synthesis and reactions ==
2-Furanone is prepared by oxidation of furfural:

It exists in equilibrium with the tautomer 2-hydroxyfuran, which serves as an intermediate in the interconversion between the β- and α-furanones. The β form is the more stable. The interconversion is catalyzed by base.

2-Furanones can be converted to furans by a two-step process of reduction followed by dehydration reaction.

Furanone is thought to contribute to the unique taste of maple syrup.

== See also ==
- Category:Furanones, various substituted structural analogs
- Pyrone, which has one more carbon atom in the ring
