= Tetronic acid =

Names
- Preferred IUPAC name 4-Hydroxyfuran-2(5H)-one
- Other names: 3H,5H-Furan-2,4-dione; 3-Hydroxybutenolide; 3-Hydroxy-2-buteno-4-lactone; 3-Oxo-γ-butyrolactone; Tetrahydrofuran-2,4-dione

Identifiers
CAS Number	4971-56-6 (Keto form); 541-57-1 (Enol form)
3D model (JSmol)	Keto form: Interactive image; Enol form: Interactive image
ChemSpider	10301432
ECHA InfoCard	100.023.289
EC Number	208-785-3
PubChem CID	521261
UNII	N2B9NB89C0 (Keto form)
- InChI: InChI=1S/C4H4O3/c5-3-1-4(6)7-2-3/h1-2H2 Key: JCGNDDUYTRNOFT-UHFFFAOYSA-N
- SMILES: Keto form: O=C1CC(CO1)=O; Enol form: O=C1C=C(O)CO1

Properties
Chemical formula	C_{4}H_{4}O_{3}
Molar mass	100.073 g·mol^{−1}
Melting point	141–143 °C (286–289 °F; 414–416 K) (dec.)
Magnetic susceptibility (χ)	−52.5·10^{−6} cm^{3}/mol
- Except where otherwise noted, data are given for materials in their standard state (at 25 °C [77 °F], 100 kPa). Infobox references

Tetronic acid is a chemical compound, classified as a γ-lactone, with the molecular formula C_{4}H_{4}O_{3}.

It interconverts between keto and enol tautomers:

Many natural products such as ascorbic acid (vitamin C), penicillic acid, pulvinic acids, and abyssomicins possess the β-keto-γ-butyrolactone motif of tetronic acid.

In organic synthesis, it is used as a precursor for other substituted and ring-fused furans and butenolides. It is also forms the structural core of a class of pesticides, known as tetronic acid insecticides, which includes spirodiclofen and spiromesifen.

== See also ==
- 5-Hydroxy-2(5H)-furanone
