= Karrikin =

Plant growth regulator

Chemical structures of karrikins (KAR1, KAR2, KAR3, and KAR4)

Karrikins are a group of plant growth regulators found in the smoke of burning plant material. Karrikins help stimulate seed germination and plant development because they mimic a signaling hormone known as strigolactone. Strigolactones are hormones that help increase growth of symbiotic arbuscular mycorrhizal fungi in the soil, which enhances plant growth and leads to an increase in plant branching.

Smoke from wildfires or bushfires has been known for a long time to stimulate the germination of seeds. In 2004, the butenolide karrikinolide (KAR_{1}) was shown to be responsible for this effect. Later, several closely related compounds were discovered in smoke, and are collectively known as karrikins.

== Chemical synthesis ==
Karrikins are formed by the heating or combustion of carbohydrates, including sugars and polysaccharides, mainly cellulose. When plant material burns, these carbohydrates convert to karrikins. Burning plant products, such as straw, filter paper, cigarettes, and some sugars, can also produce karrikins. Seed germination activity can be generated within 30 minutes of heating plant material at 180 °C (356 °F). The pyran moiety of karrikins is probably directly derived from a pyranose sugar. There is no evidence that karrikins occur naturally in plants, but it has been postulated that karrikin-like molecules do.

== Karrikin taxonomy ==
It has long been known that compounds released from smoke stimulate seed germination. To identify the active compounds that contribute to seed germination activity, smoke compounds were separated by liquid fractionation and were each tested for their effects on seed germination activity. Bioassays identified several related compounds that were named karrikins.

Six karrikins have so far been discovered in smoke, and they are designated KAR_{1}, KAR_{2}, KAR_{3}, KAR_{4}, KAR_{5} and KAR_{6}. KAR_{1} to KAR_{4} are the most active karrikins. KAR_{1} is also known as karrikinolide and was the first karrikin to be discovered.

== Mode of action ==
Karrikins are released into the air upon the burning of plants. Subsequently, karrikins then get deposited on the soil surface and stimulate seed germination after rainfall. Since karrikins are released from smoke, they are released in huge quantities. Some plants which are known as "fire-followers" are unable to germinate without karrikins. Fire-followers need rain after massive fires in order to germinate; this means that they may remain dormant and viable for decades until the right combination of fire occur in proper succession.

== Etymology ==
The first karrikin discovered, abbreviated as KAR_{1}, was initially named gavinone in reference to its discovery by chemist Gavin Flematti. After consulting with an etymologist, Flematti proposed changing the name of the molecule and its related compounds to karrikin. One of the first recorded Western Australian Noongar words for 'smoke' from the Perth area in the 1830s, is 'karrik'.

== The response to karrikins ==
Karrikins produced by bushfires occur largely in the ash at the site of the fire. Rains occurring after the fire wash the karrikins into the soil where dormant seeds reside. The karrikins and water can provide a 'wake-up call' for such seeds, triggering germination of the soil seed bank. The plants that depend on karrikins to grow are known as "fire-followers", they emerge, grow quickly, flower and produce new seeds, which fall to the ground. These seeds can remain in the soil for decades, until the next fire produces fresh karrikins. Plants with this lifestyle are known as fire ephemerals. They thrive because the fire removes competing vegetation and provides nutrients and light for the emerging seedlings. Plants in many families respond to smoke and karrikins, suggesting that this response has evolved independently in different groups.

Fire-followers are not the only plants that respond to karrikins. Seeds from a number of different flowering families like tomatoes, lettuce, and trees respond to karrikin signaling. Other studies have found that seed of ostensibly fire-adapted species do not display a sensitivity to karrikins. The difference between fire-followers and plants that respond to karrikins is their dependence on karrikins. Plants' response to karrikins is fundamental because karrikins mimic the strigolactone hormones which are originally required for growth in plants. Fire-followers, on the other hand, have fine-tuned their responses according to the availability of karrikins.

== Structure and physicochemical properties ==
Carbon, hydrogen, and oxygen make up the two ring structures found in karrikins, one of which is a six-membered, heterocyclic ring with a molecular formula of C_{5}H_{6}O known as pyran, and the other is a five-membered lactone ring known as a butenolide.

Karrikins easily dissolve in water, they are transparent, and have a melting point of 118–119 °C. However, they are unstable at very high temperatures and during common daylight, which means that they decay more rapidly than common active compounds which are not sensitive to sunlight.

== Mechanism of action ==
The mode of action of karrikins has been largely determined using the genetic resources of Arabidopsis thaliana. Perception of karrikins by Arabidopsis requires an alpha/beta-fold hydrolase named KARRIKIN-INSENSITIVE-2 (KAI2). The KAI2 protein has a catalytic triad of amino acids which is essential for activity, consistent with the hypothesis that KAI2 hydrolyses its ligand. This model is consistent with the perception of the chemically related strigolactone hormones which involves hydrolysis by their receptor protein DWARF14, an alpha/beta hydrolase related to KAI2. The question of whether karrikins act directly in plants is controversial. While some studies suggest that karrikins can bind directly to KAI2 protein, others do not support this. It is possible that karrikins produced by wildfires are converted to a different compound by the plant, before interaction with KAI2. The ability of different plants to carry out this conversion could partly explain differences in their ability to respond to karrikins and to smoke.

== Signalling ==
The activity of karrikins requires an F-box protein named MORE AXILLARY GROWTH-2 (MAX2) in Arabidopsis. This protein is also required for strigolactone signaling in Arabidopsis. Homologs of MAX2 are also required for strigolactone signaling in rice (known as DWARF3) petunia (DAD2) and pea (RMS4). Karrikin signaling also requires a protein named SUPPRESSOR OF MORE AXILARY GROWTH2-1 (SMAX1) which is a homolog of the DWARF53 protein required for strigolactone signaling in rice. SMAX1 and DWARF53 proteins could be involved in the control of cellular functions such as transport or transcription. The present model for karrikin and strigolactone signaling involves interaction of KAI2 or DWARF14 with SMAX1 or DWARF53 proteins respectively, which targets those proteins for ubiquitination and destruction.

Arabidopsis has been shown to respond to the two signals; KAR1, and KAR2. The two genes, MORE AXILLARY GROWTH2 (MAX2) and KARRIKIN-INSENSITIVE2 (KAI2) are essential for understanding the actions of karrikins and were discovered in Arabidopsis mutants which failed to respond to karrikins. In rice, strigolactones interact with the F-box protein knowns as DWARF3 upon their hydrolysis by the DWARF14 (also known as D14-type proteins). This interaction targets the ubiquitination and destruction of proteins which are responsible for different aspect of plant growth, like the outgrowth of lateral shoots. This means that strigolactones, upon their interaction with D3 and D14; ubiquinate, and destroy proteins like DWARF53, which are responsible for the outgrowth of lateral shoots, and for the inhibition of stem thickening and root branching. In Arabidopsis, karrikins work in a similar way to strigolactones; they require homologous proteins known as KARRIKIN-INSENSITIVE1 (KAI1 or MAX2) in order to be able to interact with KARRIKIN-INSENSITIVE2 which is responsible for hypocotyl elongation and the inhibition of seed germination. The ubiquination of KAI2, therefore stimulate seed germination and inhibits hypocotyl elongation. Karrikins could be used as agricultures, considering the environmental challenges that are occurring nowadays.

== Effects on plant growth ==
Karrikins not only stimulate seed germination, but are reported to increase seedling vigour. In Arabidopsis, karrikins influence seedling photomorphogenesis, resulting in shorter hypocotyls and larger cotyledons. Such responses could provide seedlings with an advantage as they emerge into the post-fire landscape. The KAI2 protein is also required for leaf development, implying that karrikins could influence other aspects of plant growth.

== Evolution ==
The gene for KAI2 protein is present in lower plants including algae and mosses, whereas the DWARF14 protein evolved with seed plants, probably as a result of duplication of KAI2 followed by functional specialisation. Karrikin signaling could have evolved with seed plants as a result of the divergence of KAI2 and DWARF14 functions, possibly during the Cretaceous period when fires were common on Earth.

== Response to wildfires ==
Karrikins are produced by wildfires but all seed plants contain KAI2 proteins, raising the question of the usual function of this protein. There is compelling evidence that plants contain an endogenous compound that is perceived by KAI2 to control seed germination and plant development, but this compound is neither a karrikin nor a strigolactone.
