= Spirodiclofen =

Insecticide

Names
- Preferred IUPAC name 3-(2,4-Dichlorophenyl)-2-oxo-1-oxaspiro[4.5]non-3-en-4-yl 2,2-dimethylbutanoate

Identifiers
CAS Number	148477-71-8
3D model (JSmol)	Interactive image
ChEBI	CHEBI:38639
ChEMBL	ChEMBL2227839
ChemSpider	17215909
ECHA InfoCard	100.130.204
EC Number	604-636-5
KEGG	C18553
PubChem CID	177863
UNII	3X7G31F5MX
CompTox Dashboard (EPA)	DTXSID6034928
- InChI: InChI=1S/C21H24Cl2O4/c1-4-20(2,3)19(25)26-17-16(13-10-14(22)12-15(23)11-13)18(24)27-21(17)8-6-5-7-9-21/h10-12H,4-9H2,1-3H3 Key: OYNVHVAEOLJJPV-UHFFFAOYSA-N
- SMILES: CCC(C)(C)C(=O)OC1=C(C(=O)OC12CCCCC2)c3cc(cc(c3)Cl)Cl

Properties
Chemical formula	C_{21}H_{24}Cl_{2}O_{4}
Molar mass	411.32 g·mol^{−1}
Appearance	White solid
Melting point	94.8 °C (202.6 °F; 367.9 K)

Hazards
- GHS labelling
Pictograms	(GHS07: Exclamation mark) (GHS08: Health hazard) (GHS09: Environmental hazard)
Signal word	Danger
Hazard statements	H317, H350, H361, H373, H410
Precautionary statements	P201, P202, P260, P272, P273, P280, P281, P302+P352, P308+P313, P314, P321, P333+P313, P363, P391, P405, P501
- Except where otherwise noted, data are given for materials in their standard state (at 25 °C [77 °F], 100 kPa). Infobox references

Spirodiclofen is an acaricide and insecticide used in agriculture to control mites and San Jose scale. In the United States, it is used on citrus, grapes, pome fruit, stone fruit, and tree nut crops.

Spirodiclofen belongs to the tetronic acid class and acts by inhibiting lipid biosynthesis, specifically acetyl CoA carboxylase, and is in IRAC group 23.
