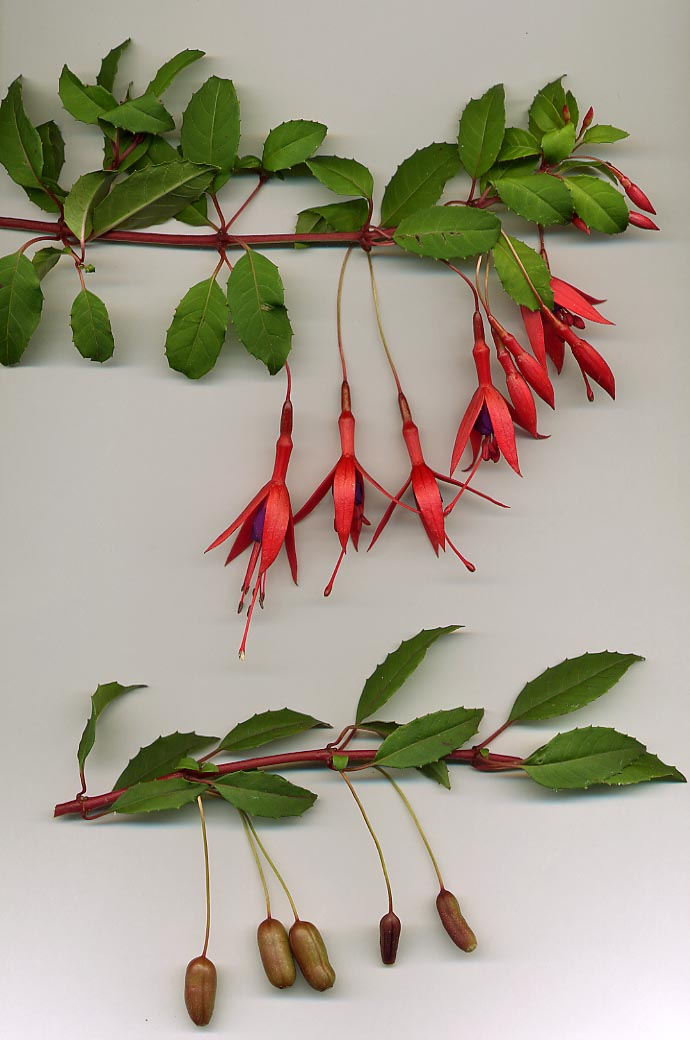

Scientific classification
- Kingdom: Plantae
- Clade: Embryophytes
- Clade: Tracheophytes
- Clade: Angiosperms
- Clade: Eudicots
- Clade: Rosids
- Order: Myrtales
- Family: Onagraceae
- Genus: Fuchsia
- Species: F. magellanica

Binomial name
- Fuchsia magellanica Lam.

Synonyms
- Fuchsia magellanica var. macrostema (Ruiz & Pav.) Munz

= Fuchsia magellanica =

Species of flowering plant

Fuchsia magellanica – commonly known as the hummingbird fuchsia, hardy fuchsia or chilco (from Mapudungun: chillko "watery") – is a species of flowering plant in the evening primrose family Onagraceae, native to the lower Southern Cone of southern South America.

== Description ==
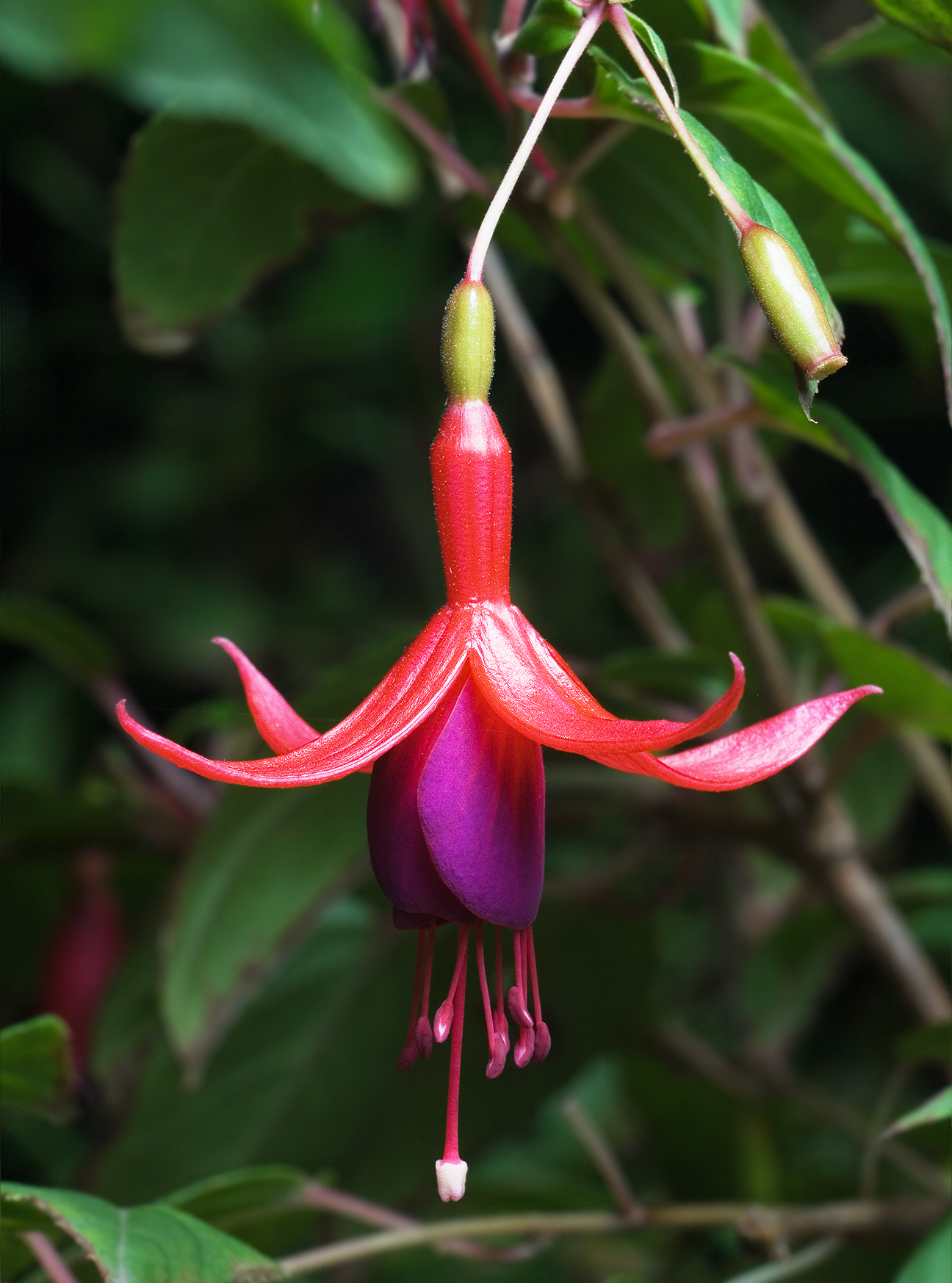
Fuchsia magellanica - flower

This sub-shrub with long, arcuate stems can grow to 1–3 metres (3.3–9.8 ft) in height and width in frost-free climates, and 1.2–1.5 m (4–5 ft) where colder. Its leaves grow in whorls of 3–4 per node or sometimes opposite, are ovate to lanceolate, 2.5–6 cm long, and 1–2 cm wide, with serrate margins and petioles 0.5–1 cm long. The plant blossoms profusely over a long period with many small and tubular pendent flowers, in brilliant shades of red and purple, softer shades of pink and lavender, and some in white. The perfect flowers are axillary and pendent, with peduncles 3–4.5 cm long, a magenta floral tube 10–13 mm long, magenta sepals 20–25 mm long, and dark purple petals 10–13 mm long that become convolute after anthesis. The stamens are exserted, with filaments 25–30 mm long. The berries are ellipsoid, 10–15 mm long and 0.7–0.9 mm wide. Chromosome count is 2n = 44.

F. magellanica is a consistently variable species across the whole of its natural range and, despite past usage and popular misconceptions, no scientific varieties are currently recognized by botanist Dr. Paul E. Berry, the leading authority on the genus. Care should be taken not to accord any of the many garden selections and hybrids with taxonomic status by using "var." Additionally, pollen stain tests conducted in the Pacific Northwest region of the United States by members of the Western Fuchsia Species Society have indicated that almost all of the many garden selections of this species are, in fact, hybrids to a lesser or greater degree.

It is distinguished from other species in the section by its elongated ovary and fruit, long petioles that are usually over 1/4 the length of the blade, and highly dentate leaf margins.

== Distribution ==
This species of Fuchsia occurs in temperate southern regions of Argentina and Chile, from latitude 32°50' S. to the Straits of Magellan. Fuchsia magellenica thrives in damp scrublands, forest edges, or clearings, often close to water sources. It is geographically isolated from the Brazilian species of the Quelusia section by a distance of 1000-1500 km. In Australia, the species is recorded as naturalized in the states of Western Australia, South Australia, New South Wales, Victoria and Tasmania.

Naturalised in south west Ireland, a common sight in hedgerows, so much so that the flower has become the emblem of West Cork.

== Cultivation and uses ==
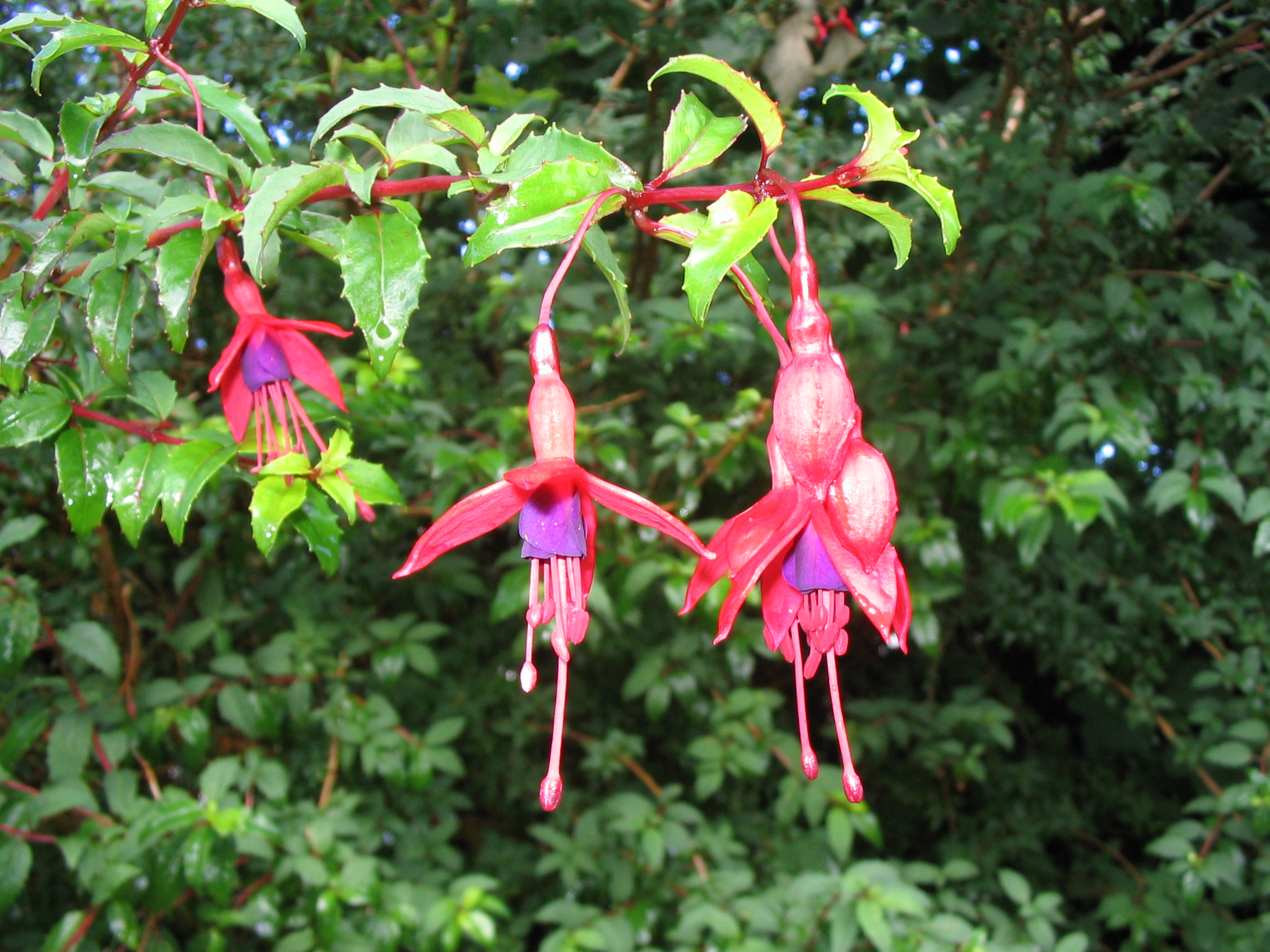
Planted in a hedge

They arrived in England in the late 18th century. According to tradition, the English gardener James Lee discovered them on the windowsill of a seaman's house and bought them for a considerable sum. As early as 1793 Lee is said to have sold a large number of pieces that he had pulled from this one copy. Fuchsia magellanica, and its cultivars and hybrids, are widely cultivated by plant nurseries and gardeners as ornamental plants. They are grown in temperate and subtropical gardens and conservatories, in containers on patios, balconies, and indoors. They prefer a sunny position.

The plants are quite cold-hardy compared to other species from more tropical climates, being deciduous where frosts are light, and only top die back in hard frosts (with mulching). The profuse drooping flowers are a nectar source attractive to hummingbirds.

This species, and hybrids using it as parent stock, are very susceptible to the fuchsia gall mite, Aculops fuchsiae, a serious disfiguring pest that was first accidentally spread from its native Brazil to the West Coast of the United States in 1980. It has more recently made appearances in France (2003), the Channel Islands (2006) and the United Kingdom (2007). Fortunately the fuchsia gall mite does not readily survive temperatures below 4 °C (39 °F), and there are effective treatments and strategies.

It has been used in traditional remedies as a diuretic and antipyretic.

=== Cultivars ===
Cultivars of Fuchsia magellanica agm include (those marked agm are recipients of the Royal Horticultural Society's Award of Garden Merit);

- 'Aurea' - bronze and gold leaves on deep red stems, vivid magenta and purple flowers
- 'Gracilis' agm - smaller leaves, more arching branch structure
- 'Gracilis Aurea' agm – yellow leaves, magenta and purple flowers
- 'Gracilis Variegata' agm (syn: Fuchsia magellanica 'Variegata') - small, cream-edged leaves, long-narrow crimson and purple flowers
- 'Gracilis Versicolor' agm – small, grey-green leaves variably margined with cream, pink flush when young; red and purple flowers
- 'Molinae' - lavender with white flowers
- 'Riccartonii' agm - dark green leaves with a faint bronze sheen
- 'Thompsonii' agm – compact, pink and purple flowers
