= Aculops ailanthii =

Scientific classification
- Domain: Eukaryota
- Kingdom: Animalia
- Phylum: Arthropoda
- Subphylum: Chelicerata
- Class: Arachnida
- Family: Eriophyidae
- Genus: Aculops
- Species: A. ailanthii

Binomial name
- Aculops ailanthii (Lin-Fuping, Jin-Changle & Kuang-Haiyua, 1997)

Species of mite

Aculops ailanthii, the Ailanthus leafcurl mite, is a species of eriophyid mite that infects trees-of-heaven (Ailanthus altissima). Very little is known about this species. A. ailanthii has been proposed as a potential biocontrol alongside ailanthus webworms and mimosa wilt (Fusarium oxysporum) in North America, where Ailanthus is a severe invasive.

== Identification ==
Infections by this species can be found by the changes it makes to the leaves of A. altissima. Compared to healthy leaves, leaves infected by A. ailanthii have somewhat undercurled, wrinkled and somewhat glossier. This can be difficult to detect compared to the conspicuous galls made by many other members of Eriophyidae, possibly contributing to the poorly known status. The whitish mites themselves are tiny and hard to find on the underside of the leaves.
