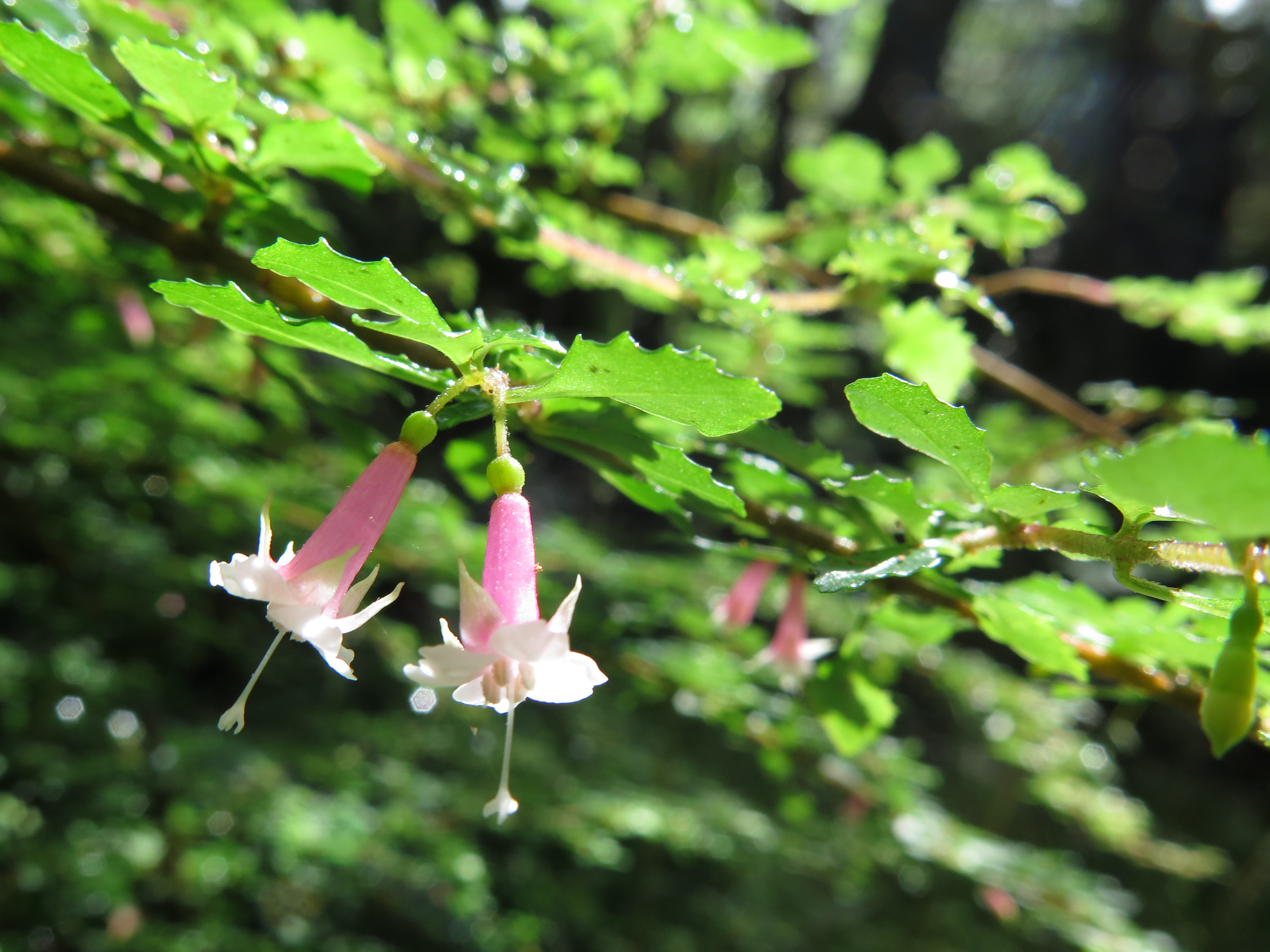

Scientific classification
- Kingdom: Plantae
- Clade: Tracheophytes
- Clade: Angiosperms
- Clade: Eudicots
- Clade: Rosids
- Order: Myrtales
- Family: Onagraceae
- Genus: Fuchsia
- Species: F. thymifolia

Binomial name
- Fuchsia thymifolia Kunth, 1823

Synonyms
- Brebissonia thymifolia (Kunth) Steud. 1840; Encliandra thymifolia (Kunth) Lilja 1841; Lyciopsis thymifolia (Kunth) Spach 1835

= Fuchsia thymifolia =

Species of plant

Fuchsia thymifolia is a species of Fuchsia found in Mexico to North Guatemala.

== Description ==
It is a shrub that reaches a size of 1 to 1.5 m in height. The leaves are ovate, 1–5 cm long with an entire edge. The flowers are pinkish white and the fruits are a purple grape-shaped berry.

Chromosome number is 2n = 22.

== Distribution ==
Plants are found in Sinaloa and Durango states of Mexico south towards Chiapas and into northern Guatemala. It inhabits a temperate climate in grassland and forest with oak, pine and Abies mixed pine-oak forests at elevations of 1800 to 3900 meters.

== Subspecies ==
There are two recognized subspecies:

Image	Name	Description	Distribution
	Fuchsia thymifolia subsp. minimiflora	Plant grows 1–3 meters tall. Leaves are elliptic and narrowly ovate with a 8–24 mm long petiole. Flower tube is 2.6–4 mm long	Found in Mexico (Chiapas) and Guatemala (Antigua Guatemala) in forests of Pinus, Quercus, and Arbutus at elevations of 2100 to 2500 meters.
	Fuchsia thymifolia subsp. thymiflora	Plant grows 0.5-2.2 meters tall. Leaves are elliptic and ovate with a 4–17 mm long petiole. Flower tube is 3.5-6.5 mm long	Found in Mexico (Sinaloa, Durango, Jalisco, Vera Cruz, Hidalgo and Oaxaca) in Pinus, Quercus, and Abies forest at elevations of 2000 to 3200 meters.

== Medicinal Use ==
In Mexico its medicinal use includes the treatment of thrush, sores in the mouth (thrush) and scurvy, and in the State of Hidalgo it is used for diarrhea. As a remedy, it is advisable to grind or chew the fruit and the leaf to apply it locally, or take the decoction of the aerial part. Another use that is given is in cases of cough.
