= Butenolide =

Class of chemical compounds

The simplest butenolide, 2-furanone

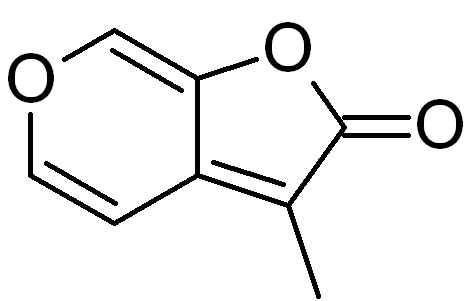
3-Methyl-2H-furo[2,3-c]pyran-2-one, found in "smokewater"

Butenolides are a class of lactones with a four-carbon heterocyclic ring structure. They are sometimes considered oxidized derivatives of furan. The simplest butenolide is 2-furanone, which is a common component of larger natural products and is sometimes referred to as simply "butenolide". A common biochemically important butenolide is ascorbic acid (vitamin C). Butenolide derivatives known as karrikins are produced by some plants on exposure to high temperatures due to brush fires. In particular, 3-methyl-2H-furo[2,3-c]pyran-2-one was found to trigger seed germination in plants whose reproduction is fire-dependent.
