= Shikimate kinase =

Class of enzymes

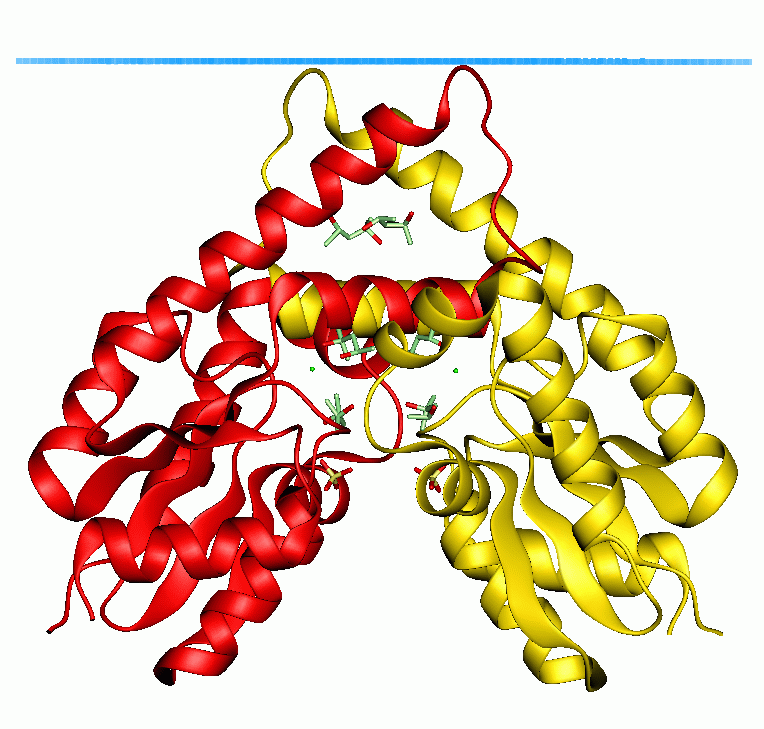
- Shikimate kinase of Erwinia chrysanthemi

Identifiers
- Symbol: SKI
- Pfam: PF01202
- Pfam clan: CL0023
- InterPro: IPR000623
- PROSITE: PDOC00868
- SCOP2: 2shk / SCOPe / SUPFAM
- OPM superfamily: 124
- OPM protein: 1e6c
Available protein structures:
- Pfam: structures / ECOD
- PDB: RCSB PDB; PDBe; PDBj
- PDBsum: structure summary

shikimate kinase
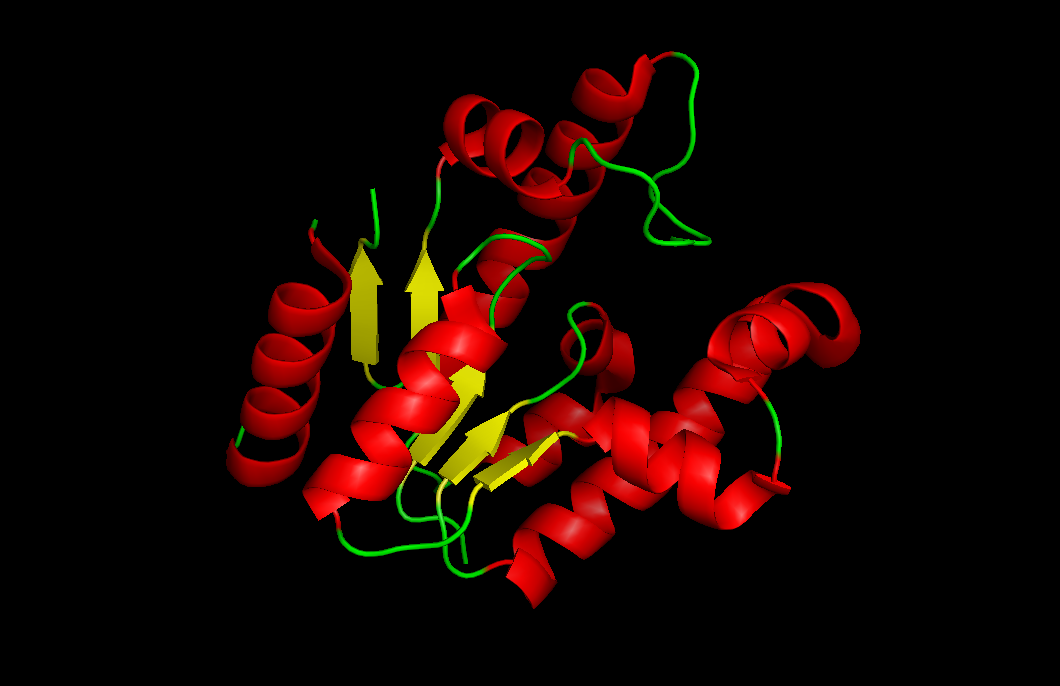
- A cartoon representation of shikimate kinase from Mycobacterium tuberculosis. α-Helices are shown in red, the central β-sheet in yellow, and loops in green

Identifiers
- EC no.: 2.7.1.71
- CAS no.: 9031-51-0

Databases
- IntEnz: IntEnz view
- BRENDA: BRENDA entry
- ExPASy: NiceZyme view
- KEGG: KEGG entry
- MetaCyc: metabolic pathway
- PRIAM: profile
- PDB structures: RCSB PDB PDBe PDBsum
- Gene Ontology: AmiGO / QuickGO
Search
- PMC: articles
- PubMed: articles
- NCBI: proteins

Shikimate kinase (EC 2.7.1.71) is an enzyme that catalyzes the ATP-dependent phosphorylation of shikimate to form shikimate 3-phosphate. This reaction is the fifth step of the shikimate pathway, which is used by plants and bacteria to synthesize the common precursor of aromatic amino acids and secondary metabolites. The systematic name of this enzyme class is ATP:shikimate 3-phosphotransferase. Other names in common use include shikimate kinase (phosphorylating), and shikimate kinase II.

== Background ==
The shikimate pathway consists of seven enzymatic reactions by which phosphoenolpyruvate and erythrose 4-phosphate are converted to chorismate, the common precursor of the aromatic amino acids phenylalanine, tyrosine, and tryptophan. The aromatic amino acids are used in the synthesis of proteins and, in plants, fungi, and bacteria, give rise to a number of other specialized metabolites, such as phenylpropanoids and alkaloids. Chorismate and several other intermediates of the pathway serve as precursors for a number of other metabolites, such as folates, quinates, and quinones. The four enzymes that precede shikimate kinase in the pathway are DAHP synthase, 3-dehydroquinate synthase, 3-dehydroquinate dehydratase, and shikimate dehydrogenase, and the two that follow it are EPSP synthase and chorismate synthase. In fungi and protists, it is part of the AROM complex, in which the five central steps of the shikimate pathway are co-localized. The pathway is not found in humans and other animals, which must obtain the aromatic amino acids from their food.

== Activity ==
The reaction catalyzed by shikimate kinase is shown below:

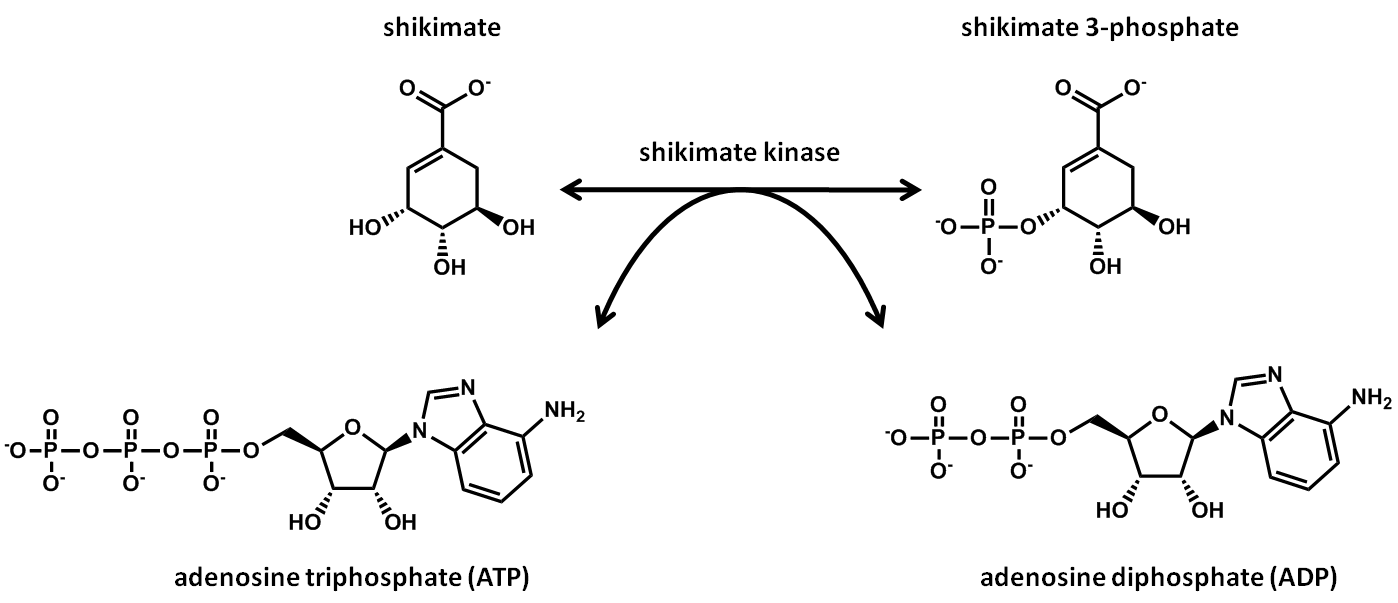
reaction catalyzed by shikimate kinase

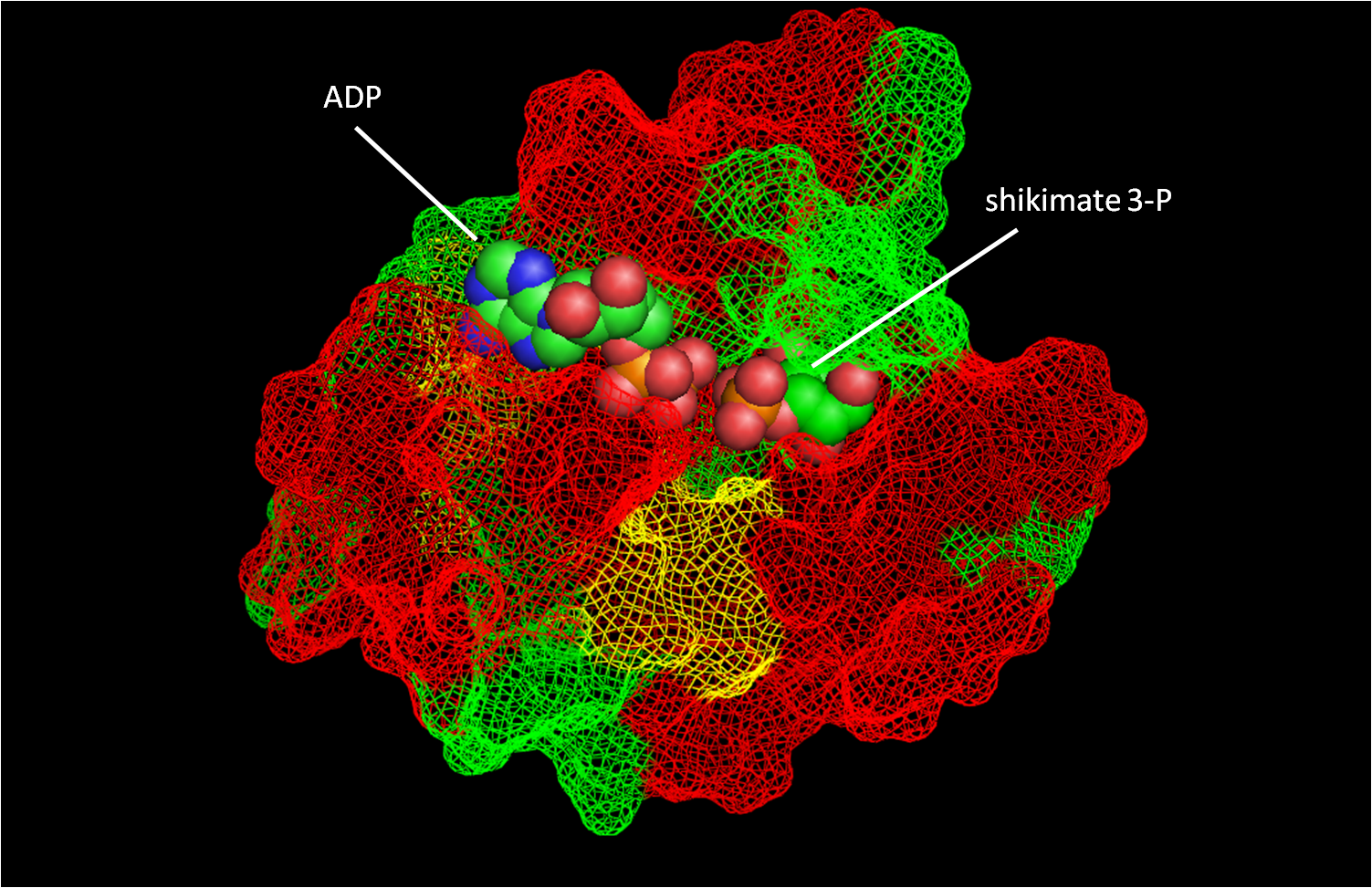
A space-filling model of shikimate kinase with ADP and shikimate 3-phosphate bound.

This reaction involves the transfer of a phosphate group from ATP to the 3-hydroxyl group of shikimate. Shikimate kinase thus has two substrates, shikimate and ATP, and two products, shikimate 3-phosphate and ADP.

== Examples ==
Human proteins containing this domain include: MAPK7 and THNSL1
