= AROB =

AROB or AroB may refer to:

- Autonomous Region of Bougainville, an autonomous region of Papua New Guinea
- 3-dehydroquinate synthase, an enzyme
