= 6-Deoxy-5-ketofructose 1-phosphate synthase =

Class of enzymes

6-deoxy-5-ketofructose 1-phosphate synthase

Identifiers
- EC no.: 2.2.1.11

Databases
- IntEnz: IntEnz view
- BRENDA: BRENDA entry
- ExPASy: NiceZyme view
- KEGG: KEGG entry
- MetaCyc: metabolic pathway
- PRIAM: profile
- PDB structures: RCSB PDB PDBe PDBsum
Search
- PMC: articles
- PubMed: articles
- NCBI: proteins

6-deoxy-5-ketofructose 1-phosphate synthase (EC 2.2.1.11, DKFP synthase, MJ1585 (gene)) is an enzyme with systematic name 2-oxopropanal:D-fructose 1,6-bisphosphate glycerone-phosphotransferase. It catalyses two related chemical reactions. Both form 1-deoxy-D-threo-hexo-2,5-diulose 6-phosphate (6-deoxy-5-ketofructose 1-phosphate) from a fructose phosphate starting material. In one reaction, fructose-1,6-diphosphate is combined with methylglyoxal:

fructose-1,6-diphosphate
+
methylglyoxal
D-glyceraldehyde-3-phosphate
+
1-deoxy-D-threo-hexo-2,5-diulose 6-phosphate

Alternatively, fructose 6-phosphate and methylglyoxal give the same main product but with D-glyceraldehyde as byproduct. This enzyme, characterised from Methanocaldococcus jannaschii is part of a pathway for the biosynthesis of 3-dehydroquinate, and hence aromatic amino acids.
