= EPSP =

EPSP may refer to:

- EPSP synthase, an enzyme produced by plants and microorganisms
- Excitatory postsynaptic potential, a characteristic of neurons
