= DHQD =

DHQD may refer to:

- Dihydroquinidine, a chemical compound
- 3-dehydroquinate dehydratase, an enzyme
