= Tilivalline =

Names
- IUPAC name (6S,6aS)-4-Hydroxy-6-(1H-indol-3-yl)-5,6,6a,7,8,9-hexahydropyrrolo[2,1-c][1,4]benzodiazepin-11-one
- Other names Epitilivalline

Identifiers
CAS Number	80279-24-9
3D model (JSmol)	Interactive image
ChEBI	CHEBI:156292
ChemSpider	113792
PubChem CID	128363
CompTox Dashboard (EPA)	DTXSID401001138
- InChI: InChI=1S/C20H19N3O2/c24-17-9-3-6-13-19(17)22-18(16-8-4-10-23(16)20(13)25)14-11-21-15-7-2-1-5-12(14)15/h1-3,5-7,9,11,16,18,21-22,24H,4,8,10H2/t16-,18-/m0/s1
- SMILES: C1CC2C(NC3=C(C=CC=C3O)C(=O)N2C1)C4=CNC5=CC=CC=C54

Properties
Chemical formula	C_{20}H_{19}N_{3}O_{2}
Molar mass	333.391 g·mol^{−1}
- Except where otherwise noted, data are given for materials in their standard state (at 25 °C [77 °F], 100 kPa). Infobox references

Tilivalline is a nonribosomal enterotoxin and was the first naturally occurring pyrrolobenzodiazepine (PBD) to be associated with disease in the human intestine. Previous work has shown that PBD tilivalline produced by Klebsiella oxytoca was linked to the pathogenesis of colitis in animal model of antibiotic-associated hemorrhagic colitis (AAHC). Since the enteric bacterium K. oxytoca is part of the intestinal microbiota and tilivalline causes the pathogenesis of colitis, it is important to understand the biosynthesis and regulation of tilivalline activity.

== Biosynthesis ==
First, 3-hydroxyanthranilic acid (3HAA) is biosynthesized from enzymes AroX and 3-dehydroquinate synthase AroB which are involved in chorismate synthesis, and are essential to tilivalline biosynthesis. Chorismate can then converted by AdsX to form 2-amino-2-deoxychorismate (ADIC). From ADIC, there are two pathways to get to 3HAA, with the likely one based on phenazine biosynthesis. In this pathway, ADIC is converted to trans-2-Dihydro-3-hydroxyanthranilic acid (DHAA) by the isochorismate IcmX. This is followed by the oxidation of DHAA to 3HAA catalyzed by 2,3-dihydro-dihydroxybenzoate dehydrogenase DhbX. The other pathway is based on tomaymycin biosynthesis, and involves chorismate being converted to anthranilic acid which requires 2-amino-2-deoxyisochorismate synthase (TomD) and anthraniliate synthase (TomP). Since the K. oxytoca genome lacks an annotated TomP gene, this pathway is not likely to biosynthesize 3HAA. Furthermore, knock-out experiments of HmoX have shown that this enzyme is not needed to synthesize 3HAA. After 3HAA is biosynthesized, it is activated to form 3HAA-CoA. Subsequently, 3HAA-CoA binds to tilivalline-specific nonribosomal peptide synthases NspA/ThdA. L-proline is also activated to its CoA form, and binds to the tilivalline-specific nonribosomal peptide synthase NpsB. Afterwards, an acyl transfer occurs via the -NH of the proline attacking the carbonyl of the CoA moiety of 3HAA, resulting in amide bond formation on the T^{2} domain of NpsB. Following this, there reductive release utilizing NADPH to yield an open N-acylprolinal (6), which is the final product of enzymatic synthesis. After compound 6 has been biosynthesized, this leads to either tilimycin (2) or culdesacin (3) via two different spontaneous ring closures. Tilimycin (2) can further be converted to tilivalline (1) by elimination of a water molecule, followed by nucleophilic attack of the free indole, which is released by the bacterial tryptophanase (TnaA) after enzymatic cleavage of L-tryptophan.

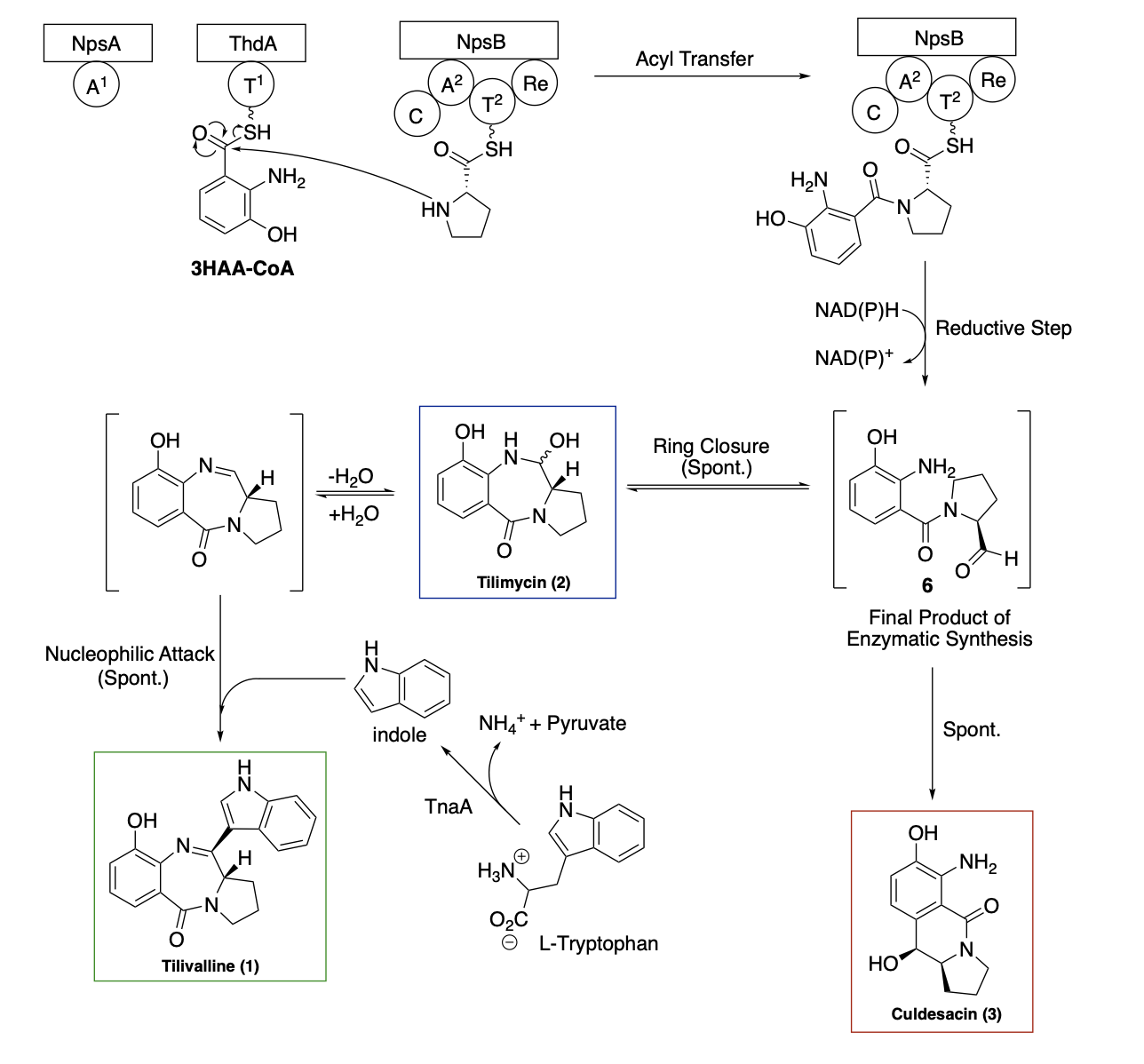
Overall Biosynthesis of Tilivalline

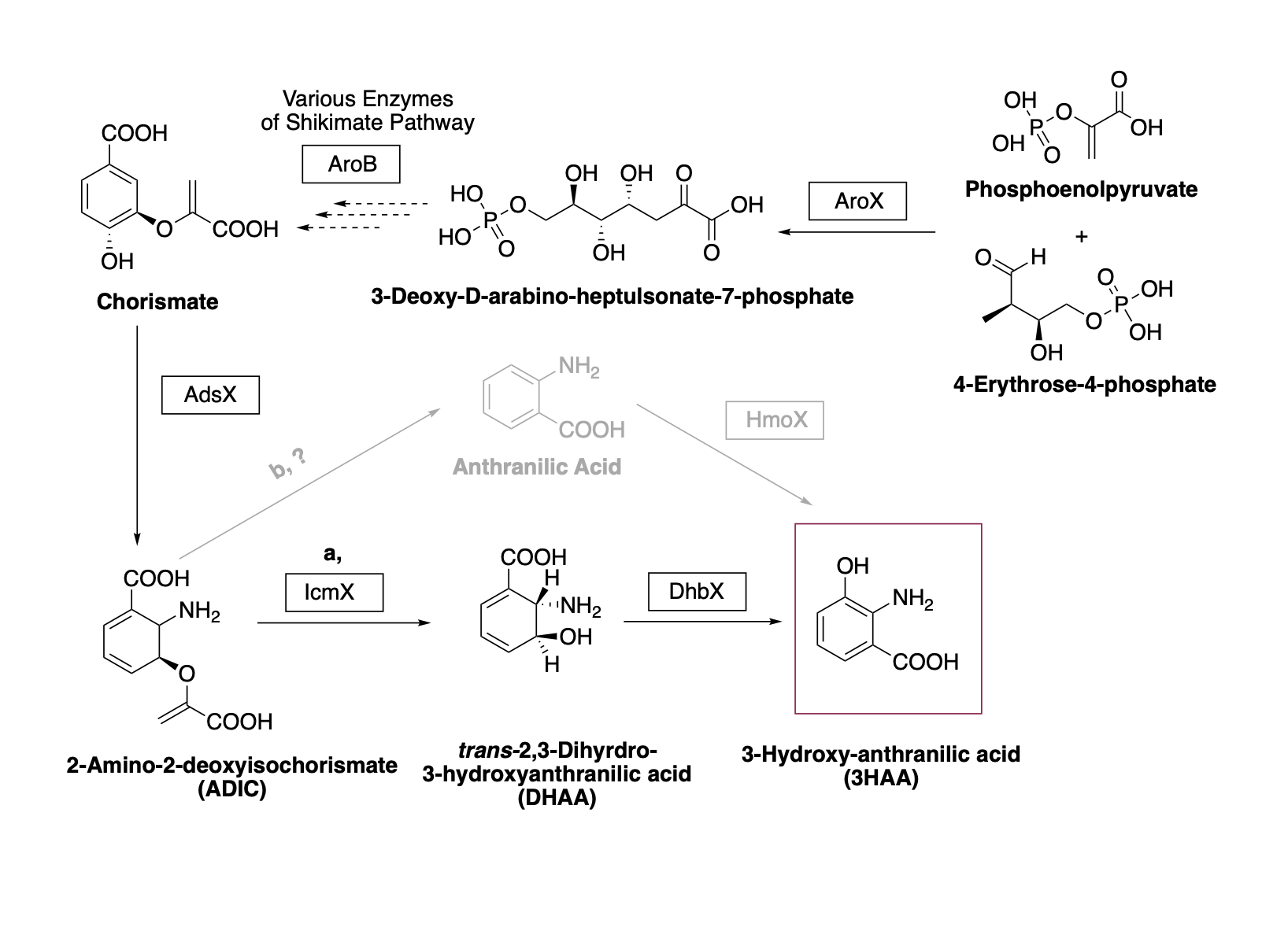
Biosynthesis of 3-Hydroxy-anthranilic acid

== Applications ==
Antibiotic-associated hemorrhagic colitis is disease resulting from treatment of patients with antibiotics such as penicillins, quinolones, and cephalosporins. AAHC causes dysbosis with a sudden onset of bloody diarrhea and abdominal cramps. The cause of AAHC is unknown, however several mechanisms have been suggested, such as allergic reaction, mucosal ischemia, and infection with Klebsiella oxytoca. In some patients, overgrowth of Klebsiella oxytoca has been shown to result in AAHC due to the production of the toxin tilivalline. More specifically, tilivalline prompted apoptosis in cultured human cells in vivo and disrupted epithelial barrier function, which agrees with colitis observed in human AAHC. Another study provided a distinct molecular mechanism for the enterotoxicity of tilivalline in AAHC, which showed that tilivalline bound to tubulin and stabilized microtubules leading to mitotic arrest. Thus, understanding the mechanism of how tilivalline drives AAHC identifies it as a valid target for diagnosis, prevention, and treatment of colitis.
