= Quinate dehydrogenase =

quinate 5-dehydrogenase

Identifiers
- EC no.: 1.1.1.24
- CAS no.: 9028-28-8

Databases
- BRENDA: enzyme data
- ExPASy: NiceZyme view
- KEGG: enzyme entry
- MetaCyc: metabolic pathway
- Rhea: reactions
- PDB structures: RCSB PDB PDBe PDBsum
- Gene Ontology: AmiGO / QuickGO
Search
- PMC: articles
- PubMed: articles
- NCBI: proteins

Quinate dehydrogenases (EC 1.1.1.24) are a type of enzyme found in bacteria, fungi, and potentially plants that catalyze the chemical reaction

Quinic acid
+ NAD^{+}
H^{+}
H^{+}
3-Dehydroquinic acid
+ NADH

The two substrates of the enzyme are L-quinic acid and oxidised nicotinamide adenine dinucleotide (NAD^{+}). Its products are 3-dehydroquinic acid, reduced NADH, and a proton.

This enzyme belongs to the family of oxidoreductases, specifically those acting on the CH-OH group of donor with NAD^{+} or NADP^{+} as acceptor. The systematic name of this enzyme class is L-quinate:NAD^{+} 3-oxidoreductase. Other names in common use include quinic dehydrogenase, quinate:NAD oxidoreductase, quinate 5-dehydrogenase, and quinate:NAD^{+} 5-oxidoreductase. This enzyme participates in phenylalanine, tyrosine and tryptophan biosynthesis.
