= 2-amino-3,7-dideoxy-D-threo-hept-6-ulosonate synthase =

Class of enzymes

Identifiers
- EC no.: 2.2.1.10

Databases
- IntEnz: IntEnz view
- BRENDA: BRENDA entry
- ExPASy: NiceZyme view
- KEGG: KEGG entry
- MetaCyc: metabolic pathway
- PRIAM: profile
- PDB structures: RCSB PDB PDBe PDBsum
Search
- PMC: articles
- PubMed: articles
- NCBI: proteins

2-amino-3,7-dideoxy-D-threo-hept-6-ulosonate synthase (EC 2.2.1.10, ADH synthase, ADHS, MJ0400 (gene)) is an enzyme with systematic name L-aspartate 4-semialdehyde:1-deoxy-D-threo-hexo-2,5-diulose 6-phosphate methylglyoxaltransferase. This enzyme catalyses the following chemical reaction

L-aspartate 4-semialdehyde + 1-deoxy-D-threo-hexo-2,5-diulose 6-phosphate $\rightleftharpoons$ 2-amino-3,7-dideoxy-D-threo-hept-6-ulosonate + 2,3-dioxopropyl phosphate

The enzyme plays a key role in an alternative pathway of the biosynthesis of 3-dehydroquinate.

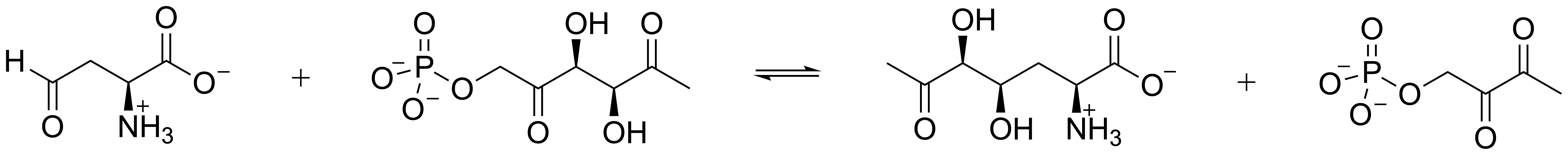
Chemical reaction catalyzed by 2-amino-3,7-dideoxy-D-threo-hept-6-ulosonate synthase
