= 3-dehydroquinate synthase II =

Class of enzymes

Identifiers
- EC no.: 1.4.1.24

Databases
- IntEnz: IntEnz view
- BRENDA: BRENDA entry
- ExPASy: NiceZyme view
- KEGG: KEGG entry
- MetaCyc: metabolic pathway
- PRIAM: profile
- PDB structures: RCSB PDB PDBe PDBsum
Search
- PMC: articles
- PubMed: articles
- NCBI: proteins

3-dehydroquinate synthase II (EC 1.4.1.24, DHQ synthase II, MJ1249 (gene), aroB' (gene)) is an enzyme with systematic name 2-amino-3,7-dideoxy-D-threo-hept-6-ulosonate:NAD^{+} oxidoreductase (deaminating). This enzyme catalyses the following chemical reaction

(1)
+ NAD^{+}
H_{2}O
H^{+}
H_{2}O
H^{+}
3-Dehydroquinic acid
+ NADH + NH_{3}

The three substrates of this enzyme are 2-amino-2,3,7-trideoxy-D-lyxo-hept-6-ulosonic acid (1), water, and oxidised nicotinamide adenine dinucleotide (NAD^{+}). Its products are 3-dehydroquinic acid, ammonia, reduced NADH, and a proton. It was isolated from the archaeon Methanocaldococcus jannaschii.
