= Chorismate synthase =

chorismate synthase
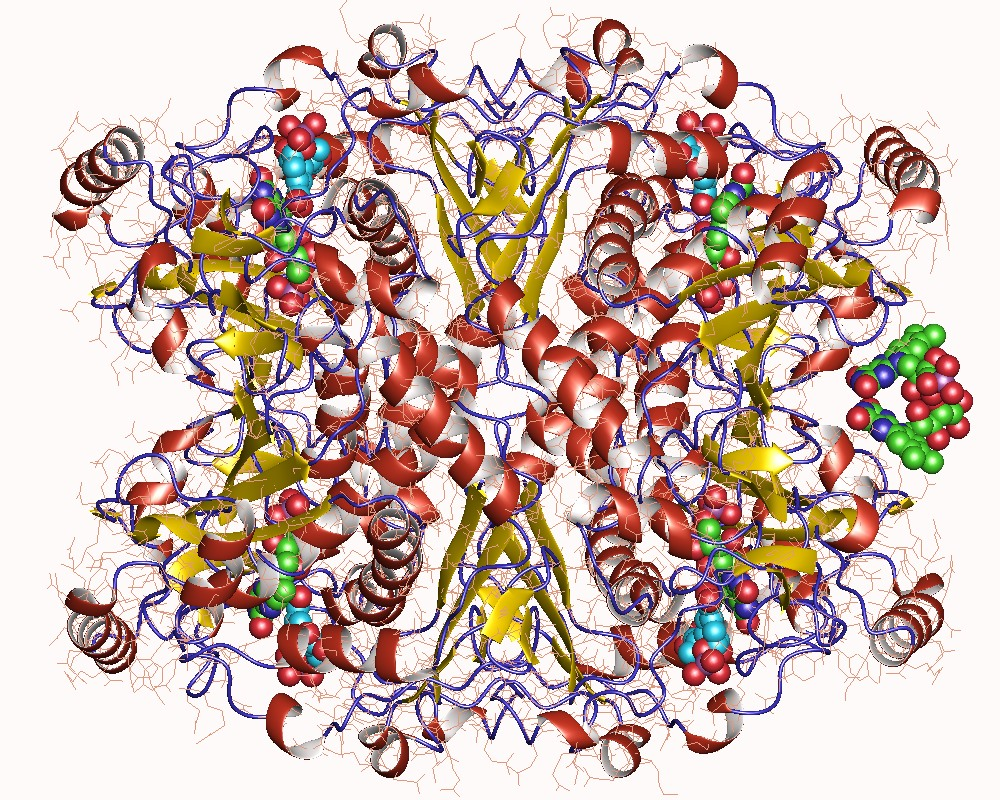
- Chorismate synthase homotetramer, Streptococcus pneumoniae

Identifiers
- EC no.: 4.2.3.5
- CAS no.: 9077-07-0

Databases
- IntEnz: IntEnz view
- BRENDA: BRENDA entry
- ExPASy: NiceZyme view
- KEGG: KEGG entry
- MetaCyc: metabolic pathway
- PRIAM: profile
- PDB structures: RCSB PDB PDBe PDBsum
- Gene Ontology: AmiGO / QuickGO
Search
- PMC: articles
- PubMed: articles
- NCBI: proteins

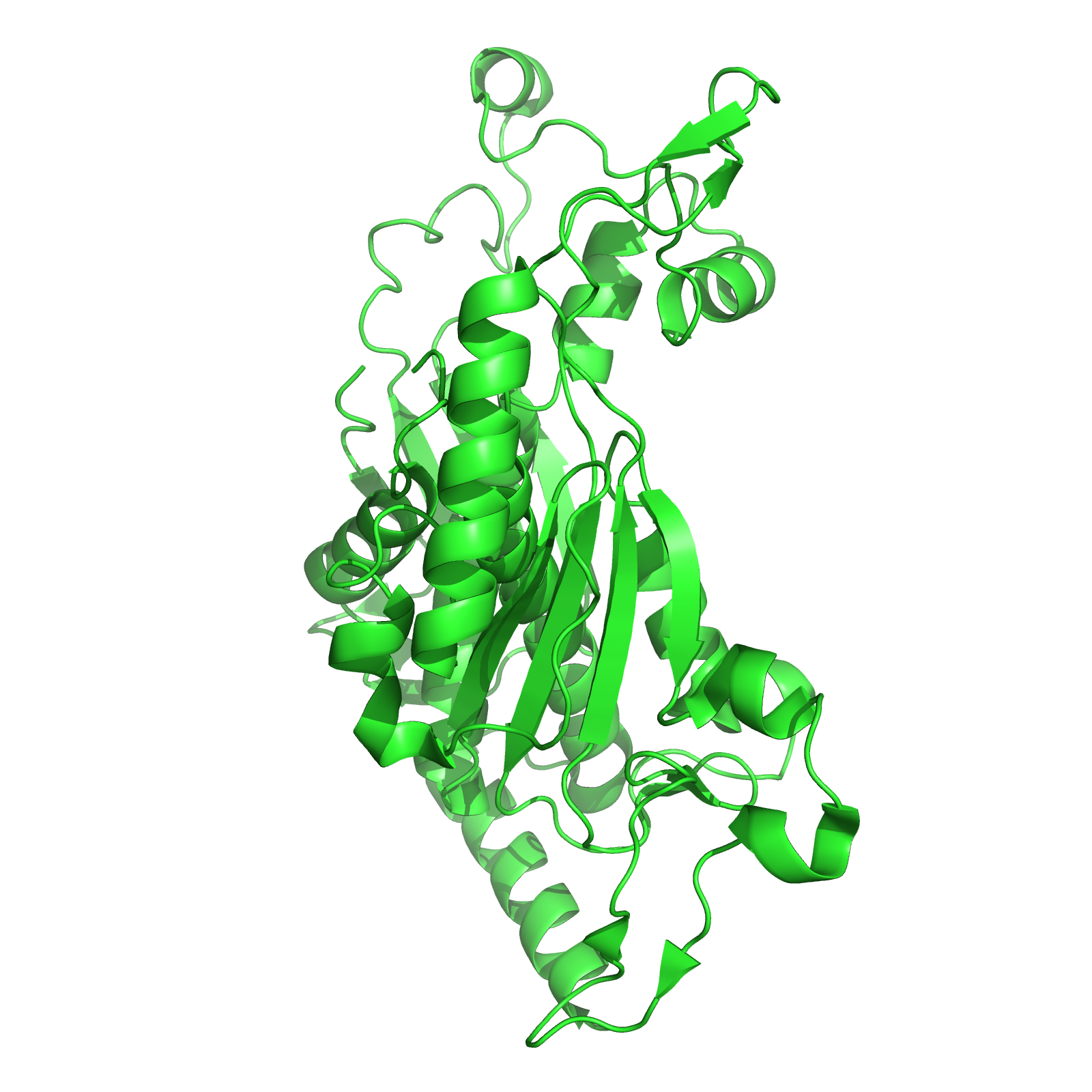
Ribbon diagram of the 1ZTB structure, Chorismate synthase isolated from Mycobacterium tuberculosis.

The enzyme chorismate synthase (EC 4.2.3.5) catalyzes the chemical reaction

5-O-(1-carboxyvinyl)-3-phosphoshikimate $\rightleftharpoons$ chorismate + phosphate

This enzyme belongs to the family of lyases, specifically those carbon-oxygen lyases acting on phosphates. The systematic name of this enzyme class is 5-O-(1-carboxyvinyl)-3-phosphoshikimate phosphate-lyase (chorismate-forming). This enzyme is also called 5-O-(1-carboxyvinyl)-3-phosphoshikimate phosphate-lyase. This enzyme participates in phenylalanine, tyrosine and tryptophan biosynthesis.

Chorismate synthase

Identifiers
- Symbol: Chorismate_synt
- Pfam: PF01264
- InterPro: IPR000453
- PROSITE: PDOC00628
- SCOP2: 1q1l / SCOPe / SUPFAM
Available protein structures:
- PDB: 1umfA:8-351 1um0A:8-351 1sq1A:8-348 1r52A:8-366 1r53A:8-366 1qxoB:1-366 1q1lC:6-376 IPR000453 PF01264 (ECOD; PDBsum)
- AlphaFold: IPR000453; PF01264

Chorismate synthase catalyzes the last of the seven steps in the shikimate pathway which is used in prokaryotes, fungi and plants for the biosynthesis of aromatic amino acids. It catalyzes the 1,4-trans elimination of the phosphate group from 5-enolpyruvylshikimate-3-phosphate (EPSP) to form chorismate which can then be used in phenylalanine, tyrosine or tryptophan biosynthesis. Chorismate synthase requires the presence of a reduced flavin mononucleotide (FMNH2 or FADH2) for its activity. Chorismate synthase from various sources shows a high degree of sequence conservation. It is a protein of about 360 to 400 amino-acid residues.

== Biological and practical function ==
The shikimate pathway synthesises precursors to aromatic amino acids, as well as other aromatic compounds that have various involvement with processes such as "UV protection, electron transport, signaling, communication, plant defense, and the wound response". Because humans lack the shikimate pathway, but it is required for the survival of many microorganisms, the pathway and chorismate synthase in particular are considered to be potential targets for new antimicrobial treatments. For example, chorismate synthase is known to be essential to the survival of Mycobacterium tuberculosis, making the enzyme an attractive antibiotic target for control of this pathogen.

== Structural studies ==
As of late 2007, 9 structures have been solved for this class of enzymes, with PDB accession codes 1Q1L, 1QXO, 1R52, 1R53, 1SQ1, 1UM0, 1UMF, 1ZTB, and 2G85.

The crystal structure of chorismate synthase is a homotetramer with one FMN molecule non-covalently bound to each of the four monomers. Each monomer is made up of 9 alpha helices and 18 beta strands and the core is assembled in a unique beta-alpha-beta sandwich fold. The active sites for FMN-binding are made up of clusters of flexible loops and the area around these regions have highly positive electromagnetic potential. There are two histidine residues located at the active site which are thought to protonate the reduced flavin molecule and the leaving phosphate group of the substrate.

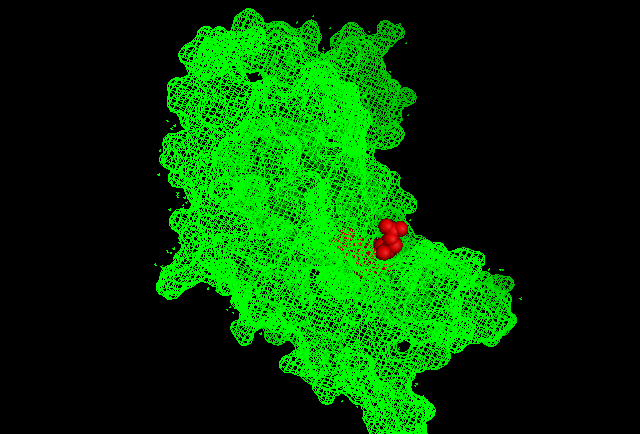
shows one of the four monomers that make up the active chorismate synthase molecule interacting with the FMN molecule in Mycobacterium tuberculosis

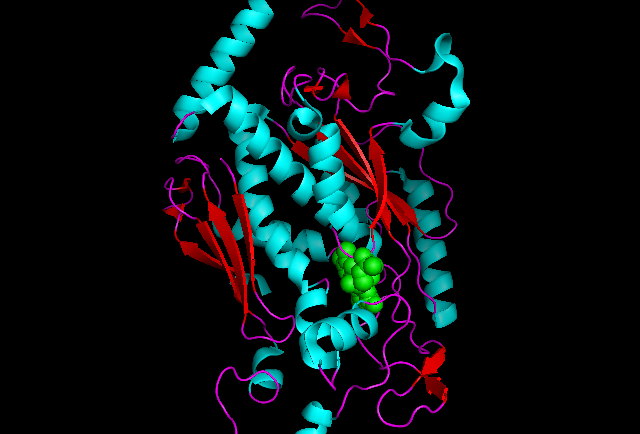
cartoon structure of one of the monomers present in the chorismate synthase molecule with FMN molecule shown in green

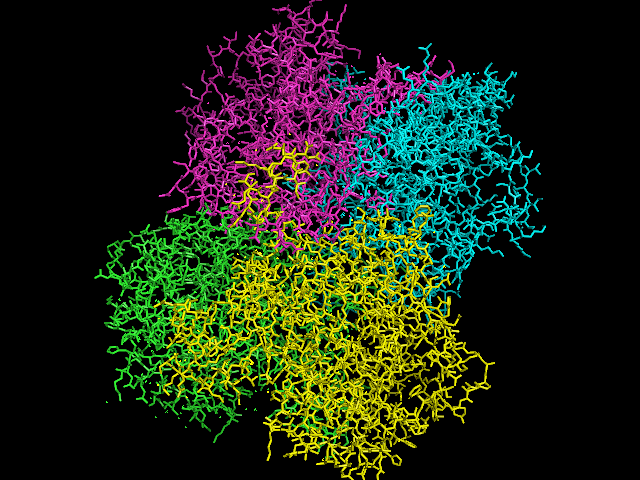
this shows the interaction between the four monomers creating the chorismate synthase tetramer

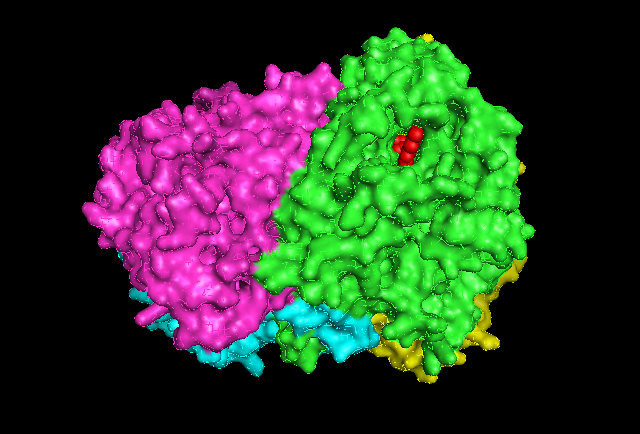
complete chorismate synthase tetramer shown interacting with one FMN molecule

== Mechanism ==
The formation of chorismate from EPSP involves two eliminations, of phosphate and a proton (H+), from the substrate. In the first step of catalysis, phosphate is eliminated, assisted by proton transfer from a conserved histidine residue. At the same time, an electron is transferred from the FMN to the substrate, forming an FMN radical and a substrate radical. Next, the FMN radical rearranges, and then a hydrogen atom is transferred to FMN from the substrate, eliminating both radicals and generating the product. The reduced FMN then re-tautomerizes to its active form by donating a proton to a second conserved histidine. Although the chorismate synthase reaction is FMN-dependent, there is no net redox change between substrate and product; the FMN merely acts as a catalyst.

Two classes of chorismate synthase exist, differing in how the reduced state of the FMN cofactor is maintained. Bifunctional chorismate synthase is present in fungi and contains an NAD(P)H-dependent flavin reductase domain. Monofunctional chorismate synthase is found in plants and E.coli and lacks a flavin reductase domain. It depends on a separate reductase enzyme to reduce the FMN.
