= 3-dehydroquinate synthase =

Enzyme

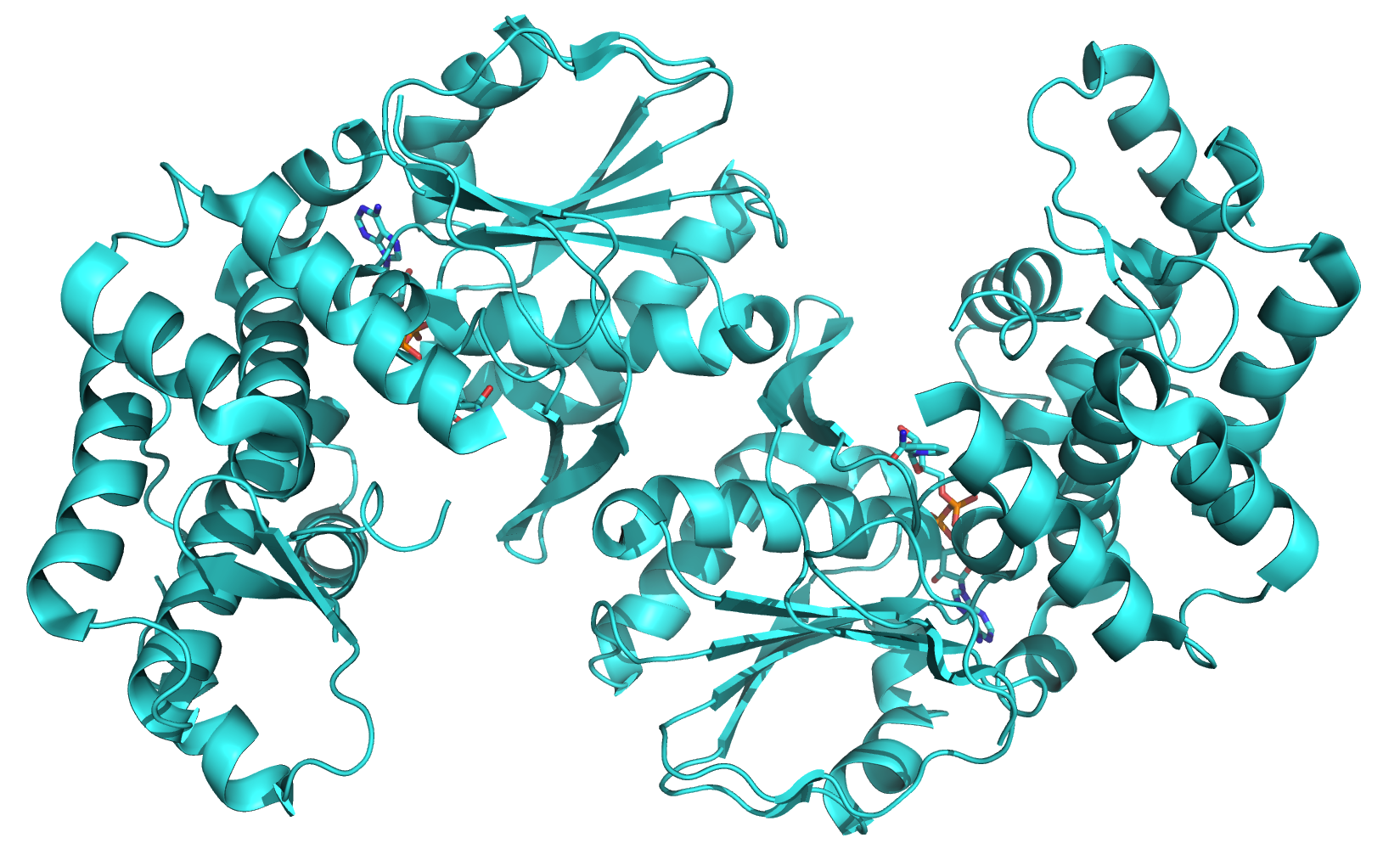
- Ribbon representation of the Helicobacter pylori 3-dehydroquinate synthase.

Identifiers
- EC no.: 4.2.3.4
- CAS no.: 37211-77-1

Databases
- IntEnz: IntEnz view
- BRENDA: BRENDA entry
- ExPASy: NiceZyme view
- KEGG: KEGG entry
- MetaCyc: metabolic pathway
- PRIAM: profile
- PDB structures: RCSB PDB PDBe PDBsum
- Gene Ontology: AmiGO / QuickGO
Search
- PMC: articles
- PubMed: articles
- NCBI: proteins

3-dehydroquinate synthase
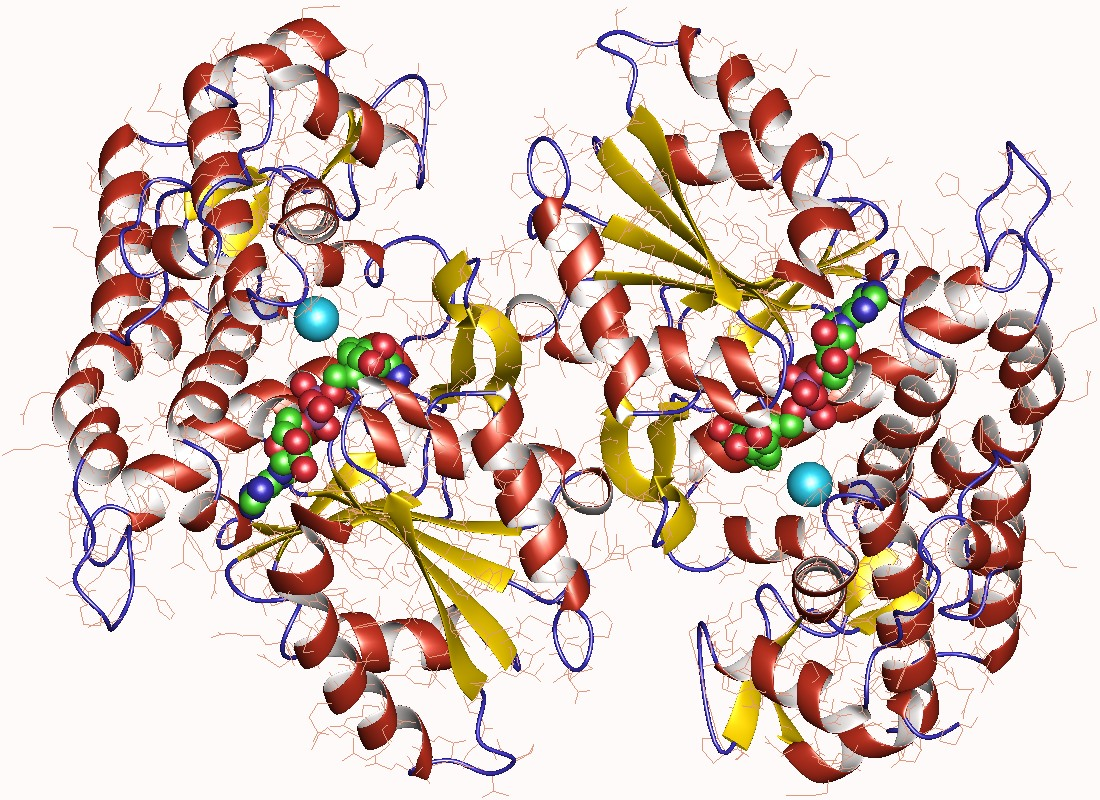
- 3-Dehydroquinate synthase homodimer, Aspergillus nidulans

Identifiers
- Symbol: DHQ_synthase
- Pfam: PF01761
- InterPro: IPR002658
- SCOP2: 1dqs / SCOPe / SUPFAM
Available protein structures:
- Pfam: structures / ECOD
- PDB: RCSB PDB; PDBe; PDBj
- PDBsum: structure summary

The enzyme 3-dehydroquinate synthase (EC 4.2.3.4) catalyzes the chemical reaction

[[3-deoxy-D-arabino-hept-2-ulosonate 7-phosphate]] $\rightleftharpoons$ 3-dehydroquinate + phosphate

The protein uses NAD^{+} to catalyze the reaction. This reaction is part of the shikimate pathway which is involved in the biosynthesis of aromatic amino acids.

3-Dehydroquinate synthase belongs to the family of lyases, to be specific those carbon-oxygen lyases acting on phosphates. This enzyme participates in phenylalanine, tyrosine, and tryptophan biosynthesis. It employs one cofactor, cobalt (Co^{2+}).

The reaction catalyzed by 3-dehydroquinate synthase

== Background ==
The shikimate pathway is composed of seven steps, each catalyzed by an enzyme. The shikimate pathway is responsible for producing the precursors for aromatic amino acids, which are essential to our diets because we cannot synthesize them in our bodies. Only plants, bacteria, and microbial eukaryotes are capable of producing aromatic amino acids. The pathway ultimately converts phosphoenolpyruvate and 4-erythrose phosphate into chorismate, the precursor to aromatic amino acids. 3-Dehydroquinate synthase is the enzyme that catalyzes reaction in the second step of this pathway. This second step of the reaction eliminates a phosphate from 3-deoxy-D-arabino-heptulosonate 7-phosphate, which results in 3-dehydroquinate. 3-Dehydroquinate synthase is a monomeric enzyme, and has a molecular weight of 39,000. 3-dehydroquinate synthase is activated by inorganic phosphate, and requires NAD^{+} for activity, although the reaction in total is neutral when catalyzed by an enzyme.

== Function ==
3-Dehydroquinate synthase utilizes a complex multi-step mechanism that includes alcohol oxidation, phosphate β-elimination, carbonyl reduction, ring opening, and intramolecular aldol condensation. Dehydroquinate synthase requires NAD^{+} and a cobalt cofactor to catalyze the conversion of 3-deoxy-D-arabino-heptulosonate 7-phosphate into 3-dehydroquinate. Dehydroquinate synthase is of particular interest because of its complicated activity relative to its small size. In most bacteria, this enzyme has only one function. However, in fungi and protists, it is part of the pentafunctional AROM complex that comprises steps two, three, four, five and six of the shikimate pathway. Together with 3-dehydroquinate dehydratase, 3-dehydroquinate synthase forms the core of this complex.

== Applications ==
3-Dehydroquinate synthase catalyzes the second step in the shikimate pathway, which is essential for the production of aromatic amino acids in bacteria, plants, and fungi, but not mammals. This makes it an ideal target for new antimicrobial agents, anti-parasitic agents, and herbicides. Other enzymes in the shikimate pathway have already been targeted and put to use as herbicides.

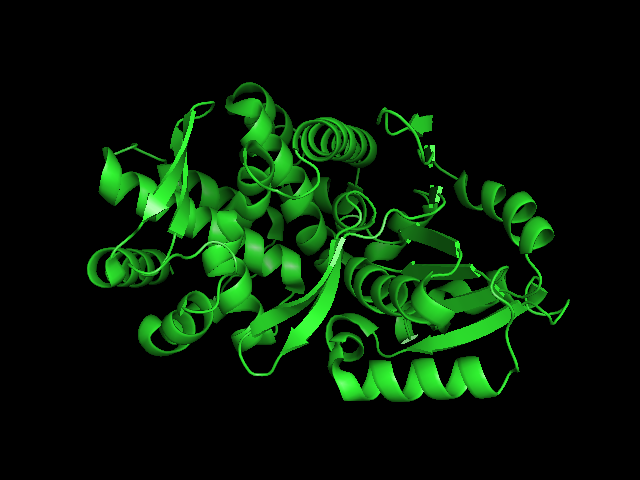
This cartoon representation of 3-dehydroquinate synthase shows the arrangement of the secondary structure of the protein

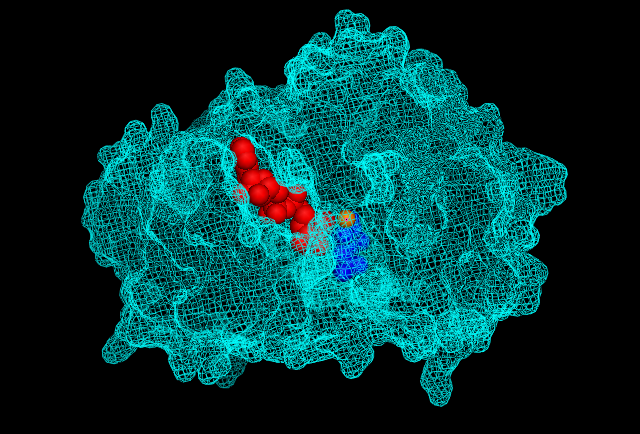
3-dehydroquinate synthase interacting with its substrates NAD^{+}, carbaphosphonate, and Zn^{2+}, which are shown as spheres in this representation

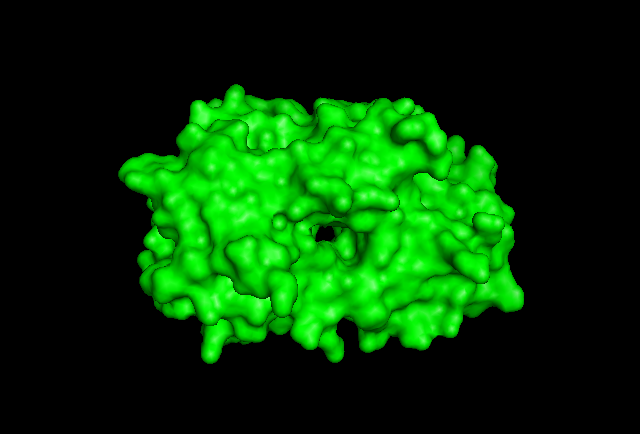
This representation of 3-dehydroquinate synthase shows the surface of the enzyme, as well as the active site, which can be seen in the middle.

== Nomenclature ==
The systematic name of this enzyme class is 3-deoxy-D-arabino-hept-2-ulosonate-7-phosphate phosphate-lyase (cyclizing; 3-dehydroquinate-forming). Other names in common use include 5-dehydroquinate synthase, 5-dehydroquinic acid synthetase, dehydroquinate synthase, 3-dehydroquinate synthetase, 3-deoxy-arabino-heptulosonate-7-phosphate phosphate-lyase, (cyclizing), and 3-deoxy-arabino-heptulonate-7-phosphate phosphate-lyase (cyclizing).
