= Transition state analog =

Class of chemical compounds

Transition state analogs (transition state analogues), are chemical compounds with a chemical structure that resembles the transition state of a substrate molecule in an enzyme-catalyzed chemical reaction. Enzymes interact with a substrate by means of strain or distortions, moving the substrate towards the transition state. Transition state analogs can be used as inhibitors in enzyme-catalyzed reactions by blocking the active site of the enzyme. Theory suggests that enzyme inhibitors which resembled the transition state structure would bind more tightly to the enzyme than the actual substrate. Examples of drugs that are transition state analog inhibitors include flu medications such as the neuraminidase inhibitor oseltamivir and the HIV protease inhibitors saquinavir in the treatment of AIDS.

== Transition state analogue ==
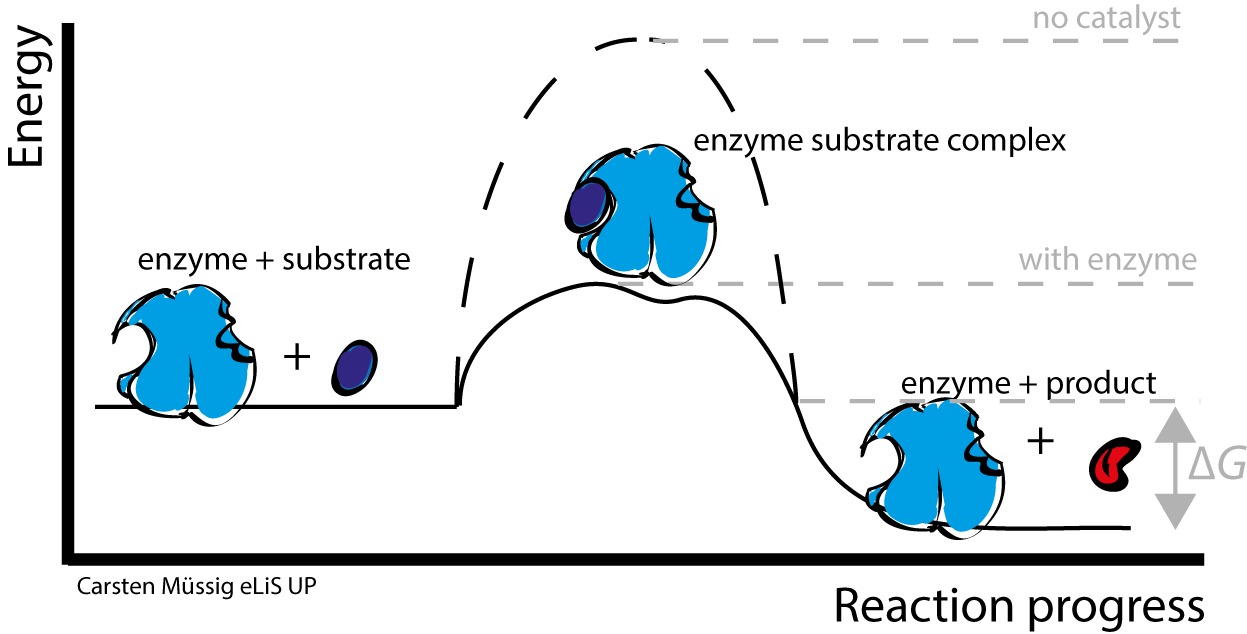
Enzyme-catalyzed reactions lower the overall activation energy of a reaction

The transition state of a structure can best be described in regards to statistical mechanics where the energies of bonds breaking and forming have an equal probability of moving from the transition state backwards to the reactants or forward to the products. In enzyme-catalyzed reactions, the overall activation energy of the reaction is lowered when an enzyme stabilizes a high energy transition state intermediate. Transition state analogs mimic this high energy intermediate but do not undergo a catalyzed chemical reaction and can therefore bind much stronger to an enzyme than simple substrate or product analogs.

== Designing transition state analogue ==
To design a transition state analogue, the pivotal step is the determination of transition state structure of substrate on the specific enzyme of interest with experimental method, for example, kinetic isotope effect. In addition, the transition state structure can also be predicted with computational approaches as a complementary to KIE. We will explain these two methods in brief.

=== Kinetic isotope effect ===
Kinetic isotope effect (KIE) is a measurement of the reaction rate of isotope-labeled reactants against the more common natural substrate. Kinetic isotope effect values are ratios of the turnover numbers and include all steps of the reaction. Intrinsic kinetic isotope values stem from the difference in the bond vibrational environment of an atom in the reactants at ground state to the environment of the atom's transition state. Through the kinetic isotope effect much insight can be gained as to what the transition state looks like of an enzyme-catalyzed reaction and guide the development of transition state analogs.

=== Computational simulation ===
Computational approaches have been regarded as a useful tool to elucidate the mechanism of action of enzymes. Molecular mechanics itself can not predict the electron transfer which is the fundamental of organic reaction but the molecular dynamics simulation provide sufficient information considering the flexibility of protein during catalytic reaction. The complementary method would be combined molecular mechanics/ quantum mechanics simulation (QM/MM)methods. With this approach, only the atoms responsible for enzymatic reaction in the catalytic region will be reared with quantum mechanics and the rest of the atoms were treated with molecular mechanics.

== Examples of transition state analogue design ==
After determining the transition state structures using either KIE or computation simulations, the inhibitor can be designed according to the determined transition state structures or intermediates. The following three examples illustrate how the inhibitors mimic the transition state structure by changing functional groups correspond to the geometry and electrostatic distribution of the transition state structures.

=== Methylthioadenosine nucleosidase inhibitor ===
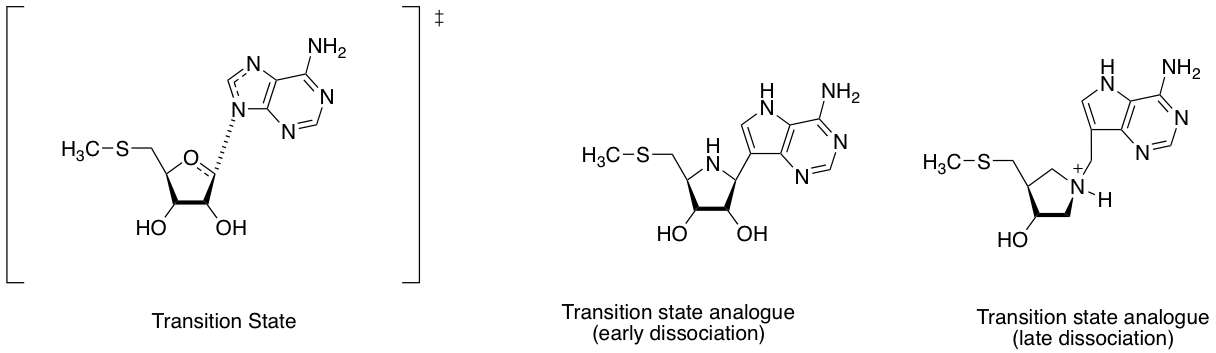
Transition state analogue example one

Methylthioadenosine nucleosidase are enzymes that catalyse the hydrolytic deadenylation reaction of 5'-methylthioadenosine and S-adenosylhomocysteine. It is also regarded as an important target for antibacterial drug discovery because it is important in the metabolic system of bacteria and only produced by bacteria. Given the different distance between nitrogen atom of adenine and the ribose anomeric carbon (see in the diagram in this section), the transition state structure can be defined by early or late dissociation stage. Based on the finding of different transition state structures, Schramm and coworkers designed two transition state analogues mimicking the early and late dissociative transition state. The early and late transition state analogue shown binding affinity (Kd) of 360 and 140 pM, respectively.

=== Thermolysin inhibitor ===
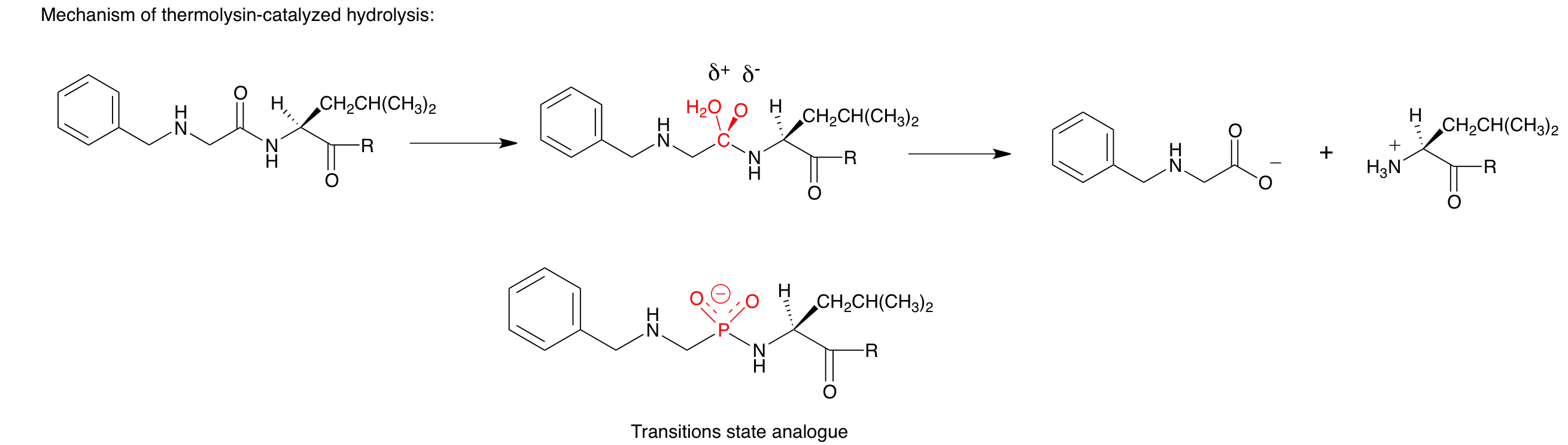
Transitions state analogue example 2

Thermolysin is an enzyme produced by Bacillus thermoproteolyticus that catalyses the hydrolysis of peptides containing hydrophobic amino acids. Therefore, it is also a target for antibacterial agents. The enzymatic reaction mechanism starts form the small peptide molecule and replaces the zinc binding water molecule towards Glu143 of thermolysin. The water molecule is then activated by both the zinc ion and the Glu143 residue and attacks the carbonyl carbon to form a tetrahedral transition state (see figure). Holden and coworkers then mimicked that tetrahedral transition state to design a series of phosphonamidate peptide analogues. Among the synthesized analogues, R = L-Leu possesses the most potent inhibitory activity (K_{i} = 9.1 nM).

=== Arginase inhibitor ===
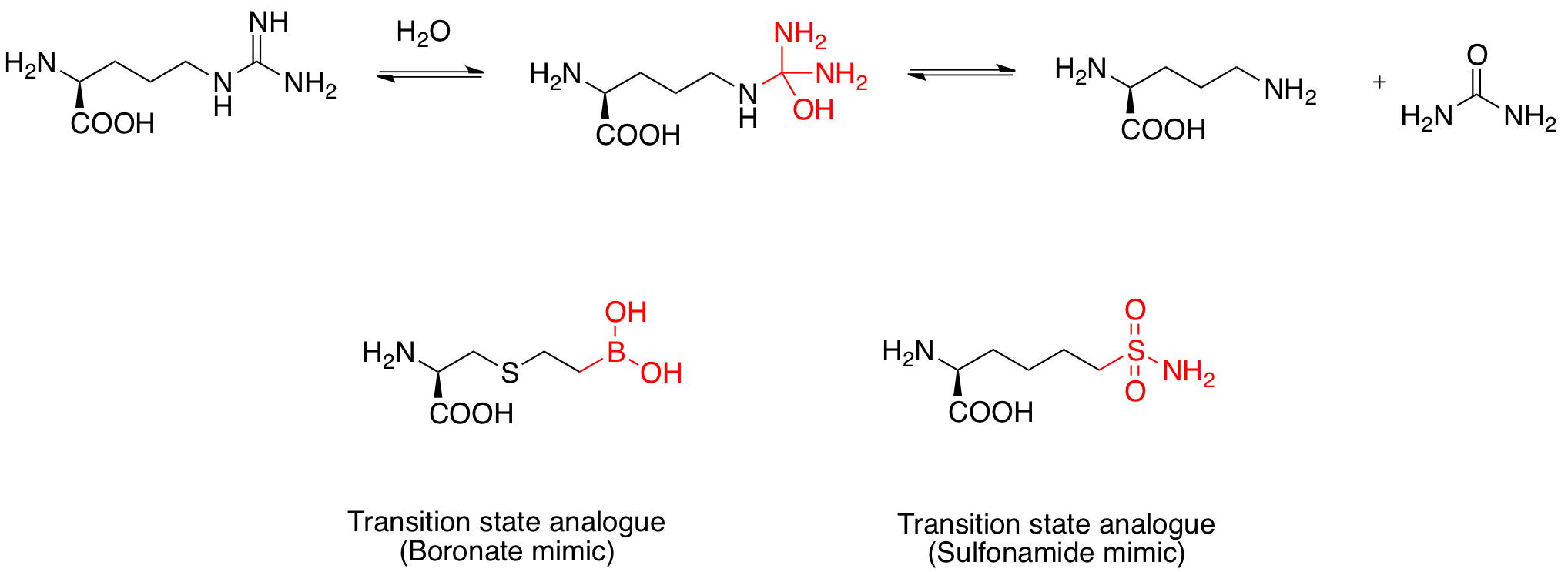
Transition state analogue example 3

Arginase is a binuclear manganese metalloprotein that catalyses the hydrolysis of L-arginine to L-ornithine and urea. It is also regarded as a drug target for the treatment of asthma. The mechanism of hydrolysis of L-arginine is carried out via nucleophilic attack on the guanidino group by water, forming a tetrahedral intermediate. Studies shown that a boronic acid moiety adopts a tetrahedral configuration and serves as an inhibitor. In addition, the sulfonamide functional group can also mimic the transition state structure. Evidence of boronic acid mimics as transition state analogue inhibitors of human arginase I was elucidated by x-ray crystal structures.

== See also ==
- Enzyme
- Structural analog, compounds with similar chemical structure
- Enzyme inhibitor
- Substrate analog
- Suicide inhibitor
- Substrate
