= Ulonic acid =

Class of chemical compounds

A ulonic acid is a carboxylic acid derived from a monosaccharide where the acid group is at position 1.
