= Methylthioadenosine nucleosidase =

Class of enzymes

Identifiers
- EC no.: 3.2.2.16
- CAS no.: 50812-28-7

Databases
- BRENDA: enzyme data
- ExPASy: NiceZyme view
- KEGG: enzyme entry
- MetaCyc: metabolic pathway
- Rhea: reactions
- PDB structures: RCSB PDB PDBe PDBsum
- Gene Ontology: AmiGO / QuickGO
Search
- PMC: articles
- PubMed: articles
- NCBI: proteins

Methylthioadenosine nucleosidase (EC 3.2.2.16) is an enzyme characterised from Lupinus luteus that catalyzes the hydrolysis of 5′-methylthioadenosine to S-methyl-5-thio-D-ribose and adenine.

5′-methylthioadenosine
H_{2}O
S-methyl-5-thio-D-ribose
+
adenine

The enzyme is widely present in plants, including rice and Arabidopsis thaliana. Inhibition of the enzyme has been studied as a way to control the bacterium Helicobacter pylori.

This enzyme is a hydrolase, specifically a glycosylase that hydrolyses N-glycosyl compounds. The systematic name of this enzyme class is S-methyl-5'-thioadenosine adeninehyrolase. Other names in common use include 5'-methylthioadenosine nucleosidase, MTA nucleosidase, MeSAdo nucleosidase, and methylthioadenosine methylthioribohydrolase.

== Structural studies ==
As of late 2007, 6 structures have been solved for this class of enzymes, with PDB accession codes PDB: 1NC1, PDB: 1NC3, PDB: 1Y6Q, PDB: 1Y6R, PDB: 1ZOS, and PDB: 2H8G.
