= 3-dehydroquinate dehydratase =

Class of enzymes

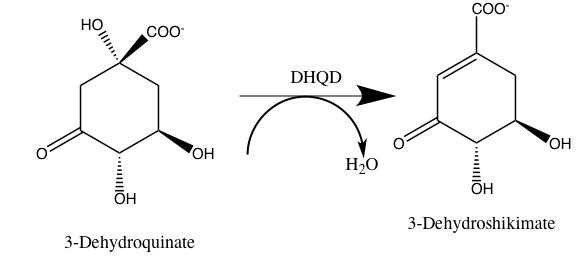
- The third step of the shikimate pathway is catalyzed by DHQD

Identifiers
- EC no.: 4.2.1.10
- CAS no.: 9012-66-2

Databases
- BRENDA: enzyme data
- ExPASy: NiceZyme view
- KEGG: enzyme entry
- MetaCyc: metabolic pathway
- Rhea: reactions
- PDB structures: RCSB PDB PDBe PDBsum
- Gene Ontology: AmiGO / QuickGO
Search
- PMC: articles
- PubMed: articles
- NCBI: proteins

Type I 3-dehydroquinase
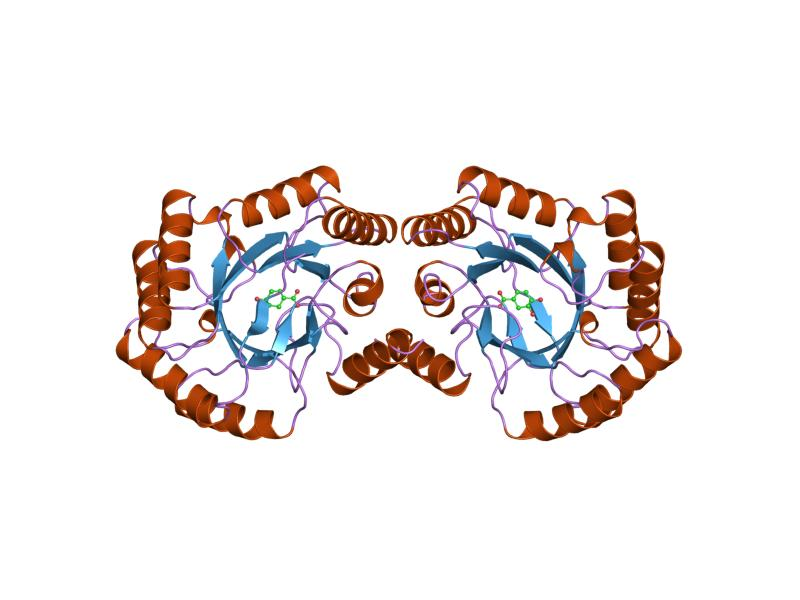
- The structure of type i 3-dehydroquinate dehydratase from salmonella typhi

Identifiers
- Symbol: DHquinase_I
- Pfam: PF01487
- Pfam clan: CL0036
- InterPro: IPR001381
- PROSITE: PDOC00789
- SCOP2: 2dhq / SCOPe / SUPFAM
- CDD: cd00502
Available protein structures:
- PDB: IPR001381 PF01487 (ECOD; PDBsum)
- AlphaFold: IPR001381; PF01487

Dehydroquinase class II

Identifiers
- Symbol: DHquinase_II
- Pfam: PF01220
- PROSITE: PDOC00789
- SCOP2: 2dhq / SCOPe / SUPFAM
- CDD: cd00466
Available protein structures:
- PDB: PF01220 (ECOD; PDBsum)
- AlphaFold: PF01220

The enzyme 3-dehydroquinate dehydratase (EC 4.2.1.10) catalyzes the chemical reaction

3-dehydroquinate $\rightleftharpoons$ 3-dehydroshikimate + H_{2}O

This enzyme belongs to the family of lyases, specifically the hydro-lyases, which cleave carbon-oxygen bonds. This enzyme participates in phenylalanine, tyrosine and tryptophan biosynthesis.

== Discovery ==
The shikimate pathway was determined to be a major biosynthetic route for the production of aromatic amino acids through the research of Bernhard Davis and David Sprinson.

== Role in the shikimate pathway ==
3-Dehydroquinate Dehydratase is an enzyme that catalyzes the third step of the shikimate pathway. The shikimate pathway is a biosynthetic pathway that allows plants, fungi, and bacteria to produce aromatic amino acids. Mammals do not have this pathway, meaning that they must obtain these essential amino acids through their diet. Aromatic Amino acids include Phenylalanine, Tyrosine, and Tryptophan.

This enzyme dehydrates 3-Dehydroquinate, converting it to 3-Dehydroshikimate, as indicated in the adjacent diagram. This is the third step in the Shikimate pathway. It belongs to the family of lyases, specifically the hydro-lyases, which cleave carbon-oxygen bonds. The systematic name of this enzyme class is 3-dehydroquinate hydro-lyase (3-dehydroshikimate-forming). This enzyme is one of the few examples of convergent evolution. The two separate versions of this enzyme have different amino acid sequences.

3-Dehydroquinate dehydratase is also commonly referred to as Dehydroquinate dehydratase and DHQD. Other names include 3-dehydroquinate hydrolase, DHQase, 3-dehydroquinase, 5-dehydroquinase, dehydroquinase, 5-dehydroquinate dehydratase, 5-dehydroquinate hydro-lyase, and 3-dehydroquinate hydro-lyase.

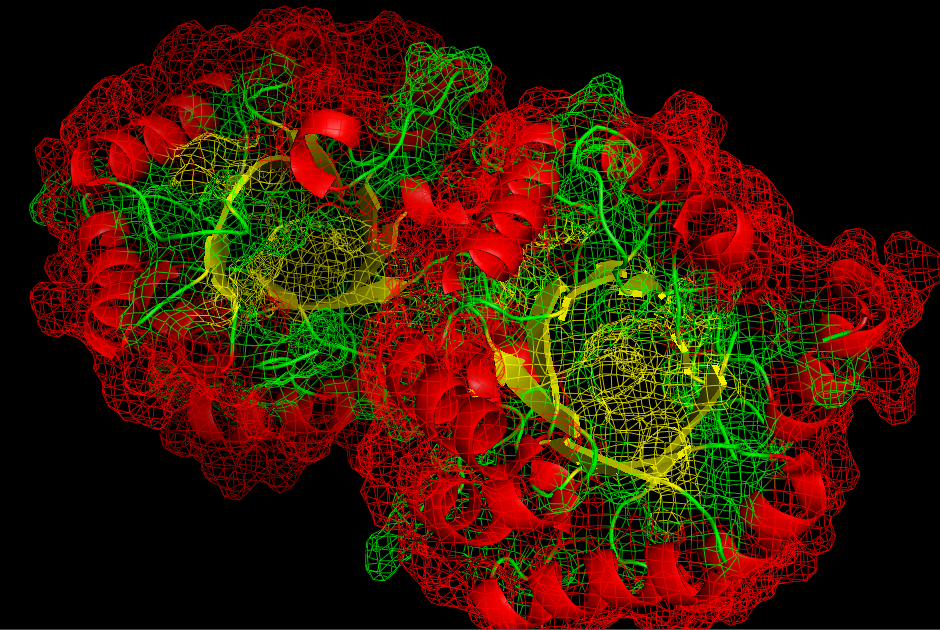
Cartoon view of 2EGZ DHQD. The alpha helices are displayed in red, and the beta sheets are displayed in yellow. (Created using MacPyMol)

== Evolutionary origins ==
=== Purposes of the products ===
The aromatic amino acids produced by the shikimate acid pathway are used by higher plants as protein building blocks and as precursors for several secondary metabolites. Examples of such secondary metabolites are plant pigments and compounds to defend against herbivores, insects, and UV light. The specific aromatic secondary metabolites produced, as well as when and in what quantities they are produced in, varies across different types of plants. Mammals consume essential amino acids in their diets, converting them to precursors for important substances such as neurotransmitters.

=== Convergent evolution ===
As mentioned previously, two classes of 3-Dehydroquinate Dehydratase exist, known as types I and II. These two versions have different amino acid sequences and different secondary structures. Type I is present in fungi, plants, and some bacteria, for the biosynthesis of chorismate. It catalyzes the cis-dehydration of 3-Dehydroquinate via a covalent imine intermediate. Type I is heat liable and has K_{m} values in the low micromolar range. Type II is present in the quinate pathway of fungi and the shikimate pathway of most bacteria. It catalyzes a trans-dehydration using an enolate intermediate. It is heat stable and has K_{m} values one or two orders of magnitude higher than the Type I K_{m} values.

The best studied type I enzyme is from Escherichia coli (gene aroD) and related bacteria. It is a homodimeric protein. In fungi, dehydroquinase forms the core of the pentafunctional AROM complex, which catalyses five consecutive steps in the shikimate pathway. A histidine is involved in the catalytic mechanism.

=== Other purposes ===
3-Dehydroquinate Dehydratase is also an enzyme present in the process of the degradation of quinate. Both 3-Dehydroquinate and 3-Dehydroshikimate are intermediates in the reaction mechanism. The following image shows this process in Quinate Degradation.

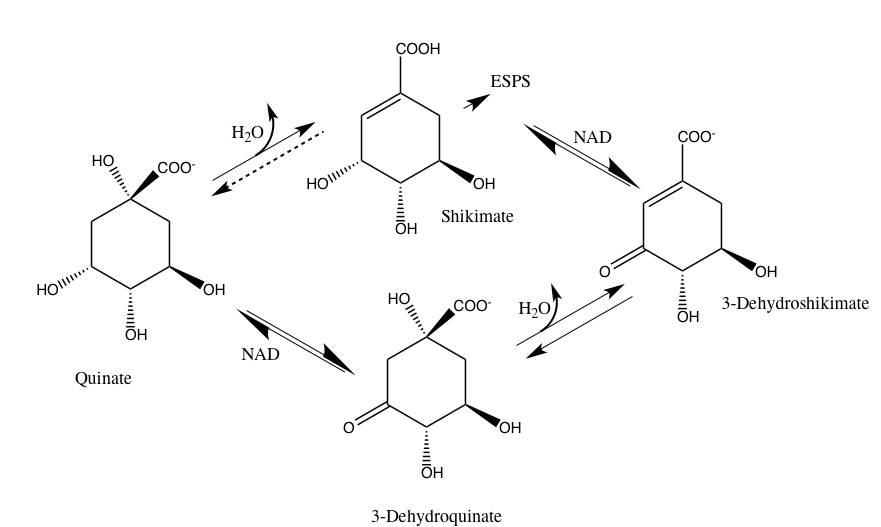

== Structure ==
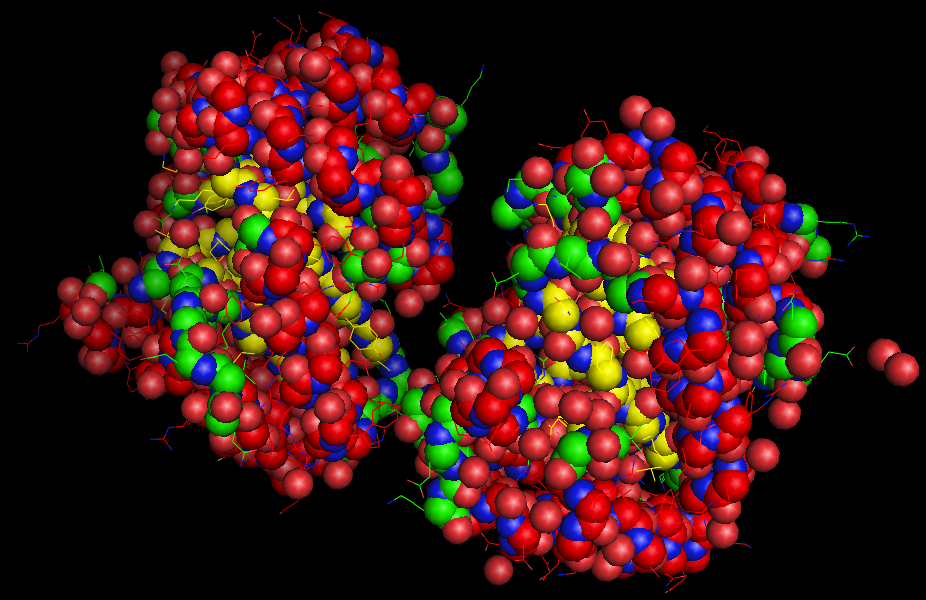
Image of 2EGZ DHQD. Both monomers of the enzyme are visible. The R groups of the amino acids can be seen as the sticks extending from the exterior of the enzyme. This image is color-coded to display Oxygen (red), Nitrogen (Blue), and the backbone of the protein (yellow fading to green). (Created using MacPyMol)

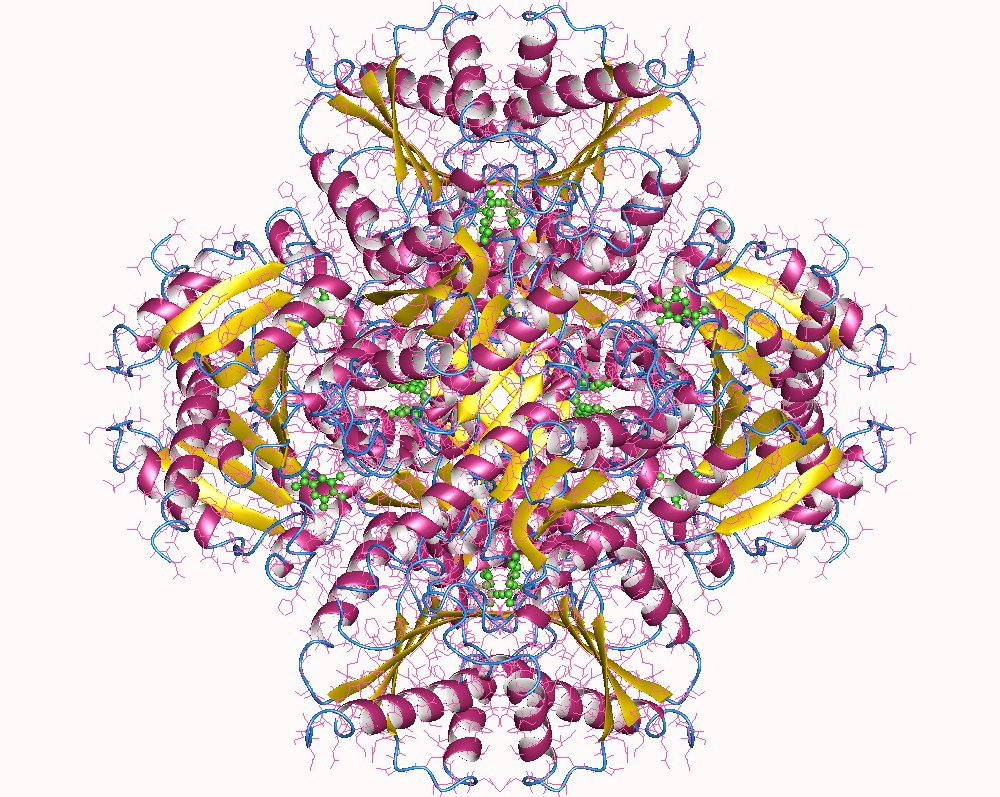
Image of 1J2Y DHQD dodekamer +12 DQA (green). (Created using Molmol)

== Applications ==
The Shikimate pathway has become a focus of research into the development of herbicides and antimicrobial agents because it is an essential pathway in many plants, bacteria, and parasites but does not exist in mammals.

Inhibitors of the shikimate pathway in mycobacterium have the potential of treating tuberculosis.

Most of the 3-dehydroquinate-dehydratase in bacteria and higher plants is type I DHQD.
