= 3-Dehydroquinic acid =

- 3-Dehydroquinic acid

Names
- Preferred IUPAC name (1R,3R,4S)-1,3,4-Trihydroxy-5-oxocyclohexane-1-carboxylic acid

Identifiers
CAS Number	10534-44-8
3D model (JSmol)	Interactive image; Interactive image
ChEBI	CHEBI:17947
ChemSpider	388474
PubChem CID	439351
UNII	Q8HL497GUU
CompTox Dashboard (EPA)	DTXSID50909453
- InChI: InChI=1S/C7H10O6/c8-3-1-7(13,6(11)12)2-4(9)5(3)10/h3,5,8,10,13H,1-2H2,(H,11,12)/t3-,5+,7-/m1/s1 Key: WVMWZWGZRAXUBK-SYTVJDICSA-N; InChI=1/C7H10O6/c8-3-1-7(13,6(11)12)2-4(9)5(3)10/h3,5,8,10,13H,1-2H2,(H,11,12)/t3-,5+,7-/m1/s1 Key: WVMWZWGZRAXUBK-SYTVJDICBW
- SMILES: O=C1C[C@@](O)([C@@](O)=O)C[C@@H](O)[C@@H]1O; O=C1[C@@H](O)[C@H](O)C[C@](O)(C(=O)O)C1

Properties
Chemical formula	C_{7}H_{10}O_{6}
Molar mass	190.152 g/mol
- Except where otherwise noted, data are given for materials in their standard state (at 25 °C [77 °F], 100 kPa). verify (what is ?) Infobox references

3-Dehydroquinic acid (DHQ) is the first carbocyclic intermediate of the shikimate pathway. It is created from 3-deoxyarabinoheptulosonate 7-phosphate, a 7-carbon ulonic acid, by the enzyme DHQ synthase. The mechanism of ring closure is complex, but involves an aldol condensation at C-2 and C-7.

It has the same structure as quinic acid, which is found in coffee, but the C-3 hydroxyl is oxidized to a ketone group. 3-Dehydroquinic acid undergoes five further enzymatic steps in the remainder of the shikimate pathway to chorismic acid, a precursor to tyrosine, 3-phenylalanine, tryptophan, and some vitamins, including:

- Vitamin K
- Pteroylmonoglutamic acid, called folate.

3-Dehydroquinate can also be a precursor to pyrroloquinoline quinone (PQQ), an alternate redox coenzyme involved in oxidative phosphorylation.

== Biosynthesis ==
3-Dehydroquinate goes through beta oxidation, similar to fatty acids. Then, this compound (6-oxo-3-dehydro-quinate) is transaminated to 6-amino-3-dehydroquinate. Then 6-amino-3-dehydro-quinate is dehydrated and reduced to 6-amino-4-desoxy-3-keto-quinate, which reacts with dehydroalanine and alpha-ketoglutarate, to form hexahydro-pyrroloquinoline quinone. This compound is oxidized by FAD to PQQ.
