= EPSP synthase =

Enzyme produced by plants and microorganisms

EPSP Synthase (3-phosphoshikimate 1-carboxyvinyltransferase)
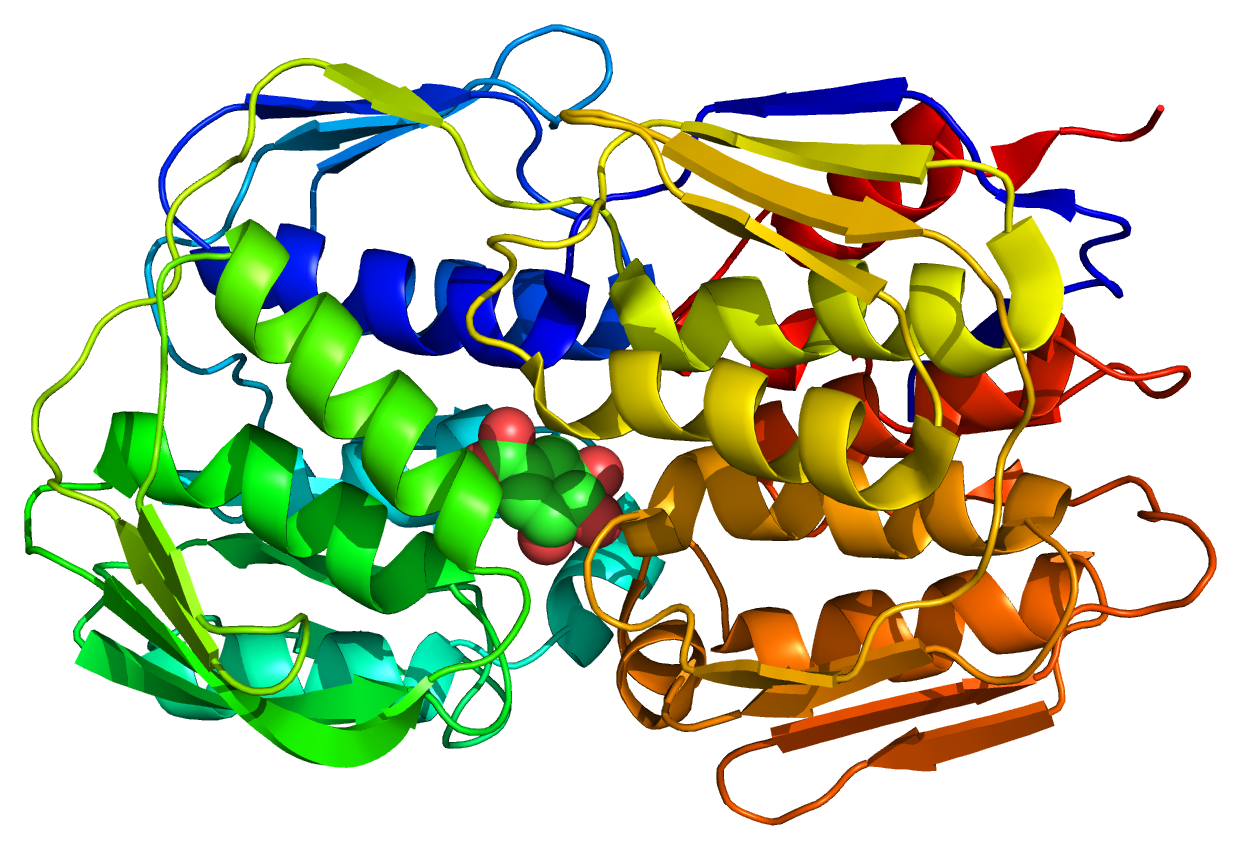
- Ribbon diagram of EPSP synthase liganded with shikimate (spheres).

Identifiers
- EC no.: 2.5.1.19
- CAS no.: 9068-73-9

Databases
- IntEnz: IntEnz view
- BRENDA: BRENDA entry
- ExPASy: NiceZyme view
- KEGG: KEGG entry
- MetaCyc: metabolic pathway
- PRIAM: profile
- PDB structures: RCSB PDB PDBe PDBsum
- Gene Ontology: AmiGO / QuickGO
Search
- PMC: articles
- PubMed: articles
- NCBI: proteins

EPSP synthase (3-phosphoshikimate 1-carboxyvinyltransferase)

Identifiers
- Symbol: EPSP_synthase
- Pfam: PF00275
- InterPro: IPR001986
- PROSITE: PDOC00097
- SCOP2: 1eps / SCOPe / SUPFAM
Available protein structures:
- PDB: IPR001986 PF00275 (ECOD; PDBsum)
- AlphaFold: IPR001986; PF00275

5-enolpyruvylshikimate-3-phosphate (EPSP) synthase is an enzyme produced by plants and microorganisms. EPSPS catalyzes the chemical reaction:

phosphoenolpyruvate (PEP) + 3-phospho shikimate (S3P) ⇌ phosphate + 5-enolpyruvylshikimate-3-phosphate (EPSP)

Thus, the two substrates of this enzyme are phosphoenolpyruvate (PEP) and 3-phosphoshikimate, whereas its two products are phosphate and 5-enolpyruvylshikimate-3-phosphate.

This enzyme is absent from animal genomes, making it an attractive target for herbicides such as glyphosate. A glyphosate-resistant version of the enzyme's gene has been incorporated into genetically modified crops.

== Nomenclature ==
The enzyme belongs to the family of transferases, to be specific those transferring aryl or alkyl groups other than methyl groups. The systematic name of this enzyme class is phosphoenolpyruvate:3-phosphoshikimate 5-O-(1-carboxyvinyl)-transferase. Other names in common use include:

- 5-enolpyruvylshikimate-3-phosphate synthase,
- 3-enolpyruvylshikimate 5-phosphate synthase,
- 3-enolpyruvylshikimic acid-5-phosphate synthetase,
- 5′-enolpyruvylshikimate-3-phosphate synthase,
- 5-enolpyruvyl-3-phosphoshikimate synthase,
- 5-enolpyruvylshikimate-3-phosphate synthetase,
- 5-enolpyruvylshikimate-3-phosphoric acid synthase,
- enolpyruvylshikimate phosphate synthase, and
- 3-phosphoshikimate 1-carboxyvinyl transferase.

== Structure ==
EPSP synthase is a monomeric enzyme with a molecular mass of approximately 46,000. It consists of two domains connected by protein strands that function as a hinge, allowing the two domains to move closer together. When a substrate binds to the enzyme, the conformational change causes the domains to clamp around the substrate at the active site.

EPSP synthase is classified into two groups based on sensitivity to glyphosate. Class I enzymes, found in plants and some bacteria, are inhibited by low micromolar concentrations of glyphosate. Class II enzymes, found in other bacteria, are resistant to glyphosate inhibition.

== Shikimate pathway ==
EPSP synthase participates in the biosynthesis of the aromatic amino acids phenylalanine, tyrosine, and tryptophan via the shikimate pathway in bacteria, fungi, and plants. EPSP synthase is produced only by plants and micro-organisms; the gene coding for it is not in the mammalian genome. Gut flora of some animals contain EPSPS.

=== Reaction ===
EPSP synthase catalyzes the reaction which converts shikimate-3-phosphate plus phosphoenolpyruvate to 5-enolpyruvylshikimate-3-phosphate (EPSP) by way of an acetal-like tetrahedral intermediate. Basic and acidic amino acids in the active site are involved in deprotonation of the hydroxyl group of PEP and in the proton-exchange steps related to the tetrahedral intermediate itself, respectively.

Studies of the enzyme kinetics for this reaction have determined the specific sequence and energetics of each step of the process. A neutrally charged lysine (lys-22) acts as a general base, deprotonating the hydroxyl group of S3P such that the resulting oxyanion can attack the most electrophilic carbon atom of PEP. A glutamic acid (glu-341) acts as a general acid by donating a proton. The deprotonated glu-341 then acts as a base, taking back its proton, and the S3P group is kicked off and protonated by the protonated lysine.

== Herbicide target ==
EPSP synthase is the biological target for the herbicide glyphosate. Glyphosate is a competitive inhibitor of EPSP synthase, acting as a transition state analog that binds more tightly to the EPSPS-S3P complex than PEP and inhibits the shikimate pathway. This binding leads to inhibition of the enzyme's catalysis and shuts down the pathway. Eventually this results in organism death from lack of aromatic amino acids the organism requires to survive.

A version of the enzyme that both was resistant to glyphosate and that was still efficient enough to drive adequate plant growth was identified by Monsanto scientists after much trial and error in an Agrobacterium strain called CP4 (Q9R4E4). The strain CP4 was found surviving in a waste-fed column at a glyphosate production facility. The CP4 EPSP synthase enzyme has been engineered into several genetically modified crops.
