= Bisphosphoglycerate =

Bisphosphoglycerate may refer to:

- 1,3-Bisphosphoglycerate (1,3-BPG)
- 2,3-Bisphosphoglycerate (2,3-BPG)
- Bisphosphoglycerate mutase
- Bisphosphoglycerate phosphatase
