= Glyceraldehyde-3-phosphate dehydrogenase (disambiguation) =

Unqualified, glyceraldehyde-3-phosphate dehydrogenase usually refers to the enzyme glyceraldehyde-3-phosphate dehydrogenase (EC 1.2.1.12).

Glyceraldehyde-3-phosphate dehydrogenase may also refer to:

- glyceraldehyde-3-phosphate dehydrogenase (phosphorylating) (EC 1.2.1.12)
- glyceraldehyde-3-phosphate dehydrogenase (NADP+) (phosphorylating) (EC 1.2.1.13)
- glyceraldehyde-3-phosphate dehydrogenase (NAD(P)+) (EC 1.2.1.59)
- glyceraldehyde-3-phosphate dehydrogenase (NADP+) (EC 1.2.1.9)
- glyceraldehyde-3-phosphate dehydrogenase (ferredoxin) (EC 1.2.7.6)
- GAPDHS (EC 1.2.1.12)
