= Glyceraldehyde-3-phosphate dehydrogenase (NADP+) =

Enzyme

Identifiers
- EC no.: 1.2.1.9
- CAS no.: 9028-92-6

Databases
- IntEnz: IntEnz view
- BRENDA: BRENDA entry
- ExPASy: NiceZyme view
- KEGG: KEGG entry
- MetaCyc: metabolic pathway
- PRIAM: profile
- PDB structures: RCSB PDB PDBe PDBsum
- Gene Ontology: AmiGO / QuickGO
Search
- PMC: articles
- PubMed: articles
- NCBI: proteins

Glyceraldehyde-3-phosphate dehydrogenase (NADP+) (EC 1.2.1.9) (GAPN) is an enzyme that irreversibly catalyzes the oxidation of glyceraldehyde-3-phosphate (GAP) to 3-phosphoglycerate (3-PG or 3-PGA) using the reduction of NADP+ to NADPH. GAPN is used in a variant of glycolysis that conserves energy as NADPH rather than as ATP. The NADPH and 3-PG can then be used for synthesis. The most familiar variant of glycolysis uses glyceraldehyde-3-phosphate dehydrogenase (GAPDH) and phosphoglycerate kinase to produce ATP. GAPDH is phosphorylating. GAPN is non-phosphorylating.

GAPN was reported first by Rosenberg and Arnon in 1954. It has been found in plants, algae, and bacteria.

== Reactions ==
Glyceraldehyde-3-phosphate dehydrogenase (NADP+) catalyzes the reaction:

D-glyceraldehyde 3-phosphate
+ NADP^{+}
H_{2}O
H^{+}
H_{2}O
H^{+}
3-phosphoglyceric acid
+ NADPH

Glyceraldehyde-3-phosphate dehydrogenase takes the same substrate but converts it to 1,3-bisphosphoglyceric acid, adding a phosphate group (P_{i}):

D-glyceraldehyde 3-phosphate
+ NAD^{+}
P_{i}
H^{+}
P_{i}
H^{+}
1,3-bisphosphoglyceric acid
+ NADH

== See also ==
- Pentose phosphate pathway
