= Phosphoglycerate kinase (GTP) =

Identifiers
- EC no.: 2.7.2.10
- CAS no.: 62213-34-7

Databases
- IntEnz: IntEnz view
- BRENDA: BRENDA entry
- ExPASy: NiceZyme view
- KEGG: KEGG entry
- MetaCyc: metabolic pathway
- PRIAM: profile
- PDB structures: RCSB PDB PDBe PDBsum
- Gene Ontology: AmiGO / QuickGO
Search
- PMC: articles
- PubMed: articles
- NCBI: proteins

Phosphoglycerate kinase (GTP) (EC 2.7.2.10) is an enzyme that catalyzes the chemical reaction

3-phospho-D-glyceric acid
GTP
GDP
GTP
GDP
3-phospho-D-glyceroyl phosphate

The enzyme characterised from the amoebozoa, Entamoeba histolytica, converts 3-phospho-D-glyceric acid to 3-phospho-D-glyceroyl phosphate by transferring a phosphate group from the cofactor, guanosine triphosphate (GTP), which is converted to guanosine diphosphate (GDP). The enzyme is unusual since it shows selectivity for guanine nucleotides, not adenine-based ones, unlike phosphoglycerate kinase.

This enzyme is a transferase, specifically one transferring phosphorus-containing groups (phosphotransferases) with a carboxy group as acceptor. The systematic name of this enzyme class is GTP:3-phospho-D-glycerate 1-phosphotransferase.
