= Phosphoglycolate phosphatase =

Phosphoglycolate Phosphatase
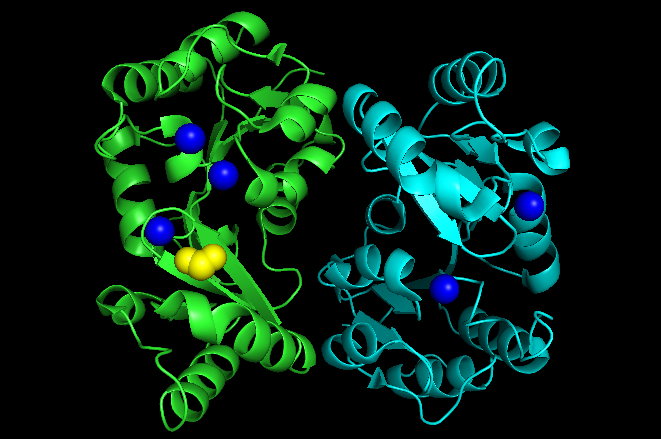
- Structure of the phosphoglycolate phosphatase dimer with attached Ca2+ (blue) and FMT (yellow), generated from 1L6R

Identifiers
- EC no.: 3.1.3.18
- CAS no.: 9025-76-7

Databases
- IntEnz: IntEnz view
- BRENDA: BRENDA entry
- ExPASy: NiceZyme view
- KEGG: KEGG entry
- MetaCyc: metabolic pathway
- PRIAM: profile
- PDB structures: RCSB PDB PDBe PDBsum
- Gene Ontology: AmiGO / QuickGO
Search
- PMC: articles
- PubMed: articles
- NCBI: proteins

Phosphoglycolate phosphatase(EC 3.1.3.18; systematic name 2-phosphoglycolate phosphohydrolase), also commonly referred to as phosphoglycolate hydrolase, 2-phosphoglycolate phosphatase, P-glycolate phosphatase, and phosphoglycollate phosphatase, is an enzyme responsible for catalyzing the conversion of 2-phosphoglycolate into glycolate and phosphate:

2-phosphoglycolate + H_{2}O = glycolate + phosphate

First studied and purified within plants, phosphoglycolate phosphatase plays a major role in photorespiratory 2-phosphoglycolate metabolism, an essential pathway for photosynthesis in plants. The occurrence of photorespiration in plants, due to the lack of substrate specificity of rubisco, leads to the formation of 2-phosphoglycolate and 3-phosphoglycerate. 3-phosphogylcerate is the normal product of carboxylation and will enter the Calvin cycle. Phosphoglycolate, which is a potent inhibitor of phosphofructokinase and triosephosphate isomerase, must be quickly metabolized and transformed into a useful substrate, and phosphoglycolate phosphatase catalyzes the first step in the regeneration of 3-phosphoglycerate from 2-phosphoglycolate at the expense of energy in the form of ATP.

Since the discovery of its activity in plants, it has been purified within human cells and implicated in 2,3-DPG regulation.

== Structure ==
The structural characterization of phosphoglycolate phosphatase from Thermoplasma acidophilum (PDB 1L6R, pictured) revealed the monomer of the dimeric enzyme (indicated by the light blue and green coloring) includes two distinct domains, a smaller cap domain and a larger core domain. While the topology of the large domain is conserved, there is structural variation of the smaller domain. The active site of the protein is a continuous tunnel through the monomer and is lined with acidic residues, a feature consistent with other acid phosphatases. In addition, electrostatic surface analysis indicates a relatively acidic surface.

=== Active site and ===
The crystallization of phosphoglycolate phosphatase from Thermoplasma acidophilum revealed 5 active sites indicated by the blue spheres in the image. The key residues of the active site are aspartate, lysine, and serine.

== Mechanism ==
This enzyme belongs to the family of hydrolases, specifically those acting on phosphoric monoester bonds.

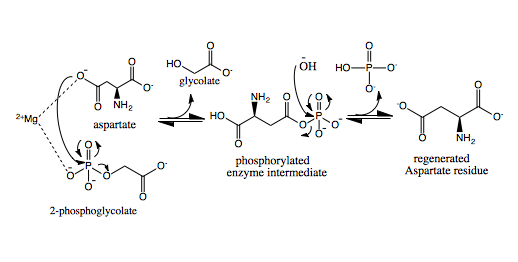
Reaction mechanism of phosphoglycolate phosphatase: 2-phosphoglycolate + H_{2}O ⇌ glycolate + phosphate

The hydrolysis of phosphoglycolate begins with the nucleophilic attack by an aspartate residue on the electrophilic phosphorus of the phosphoglycolate. The susceptibility of the bond between phosphate and glycolate is heightened by two key interactions. An interaction with the cofactor, Mg^{2+}, helps polarize the phosphate-oxygen bond and therefore increases the electrophilicity of the phosphorus atom. The other interaction of the phosphate with serine and lysine residues further increases the electrophilicity of the phosphorus atom. In addition, the Mg^{2+} also orients the nucleophilic aspartate.

The loss of the phosphate glycolate bond causes the nucleophilic aspartate to be phosphorylated, producing the enzyme intermediate, while glycolate is released from the active site. The interaction of the phosphorylated intermediate is stabilized by an interaction between the phosphate and a lysine residue. The Mg^{2+} located in the active site activates a water molecule to produce an hydroxide ion, which then hydrolyzes the phosphorylated aspartate and regenerates an active enzyme while releasing phosphate.

== Function ==
=== Plants ===
It was previously believed that the evolution of the photorespiratory glycolate mechanism that involves phosphoglycolate phosphatase was essential for photosynthesis in more complex plants and unnecessary for cyanobacteria because of their ability to concentrate CO_{2} and therefore, avoid photorespiration, similar to C4 plants. However, the finding of three different phosphoglycolate metabolism pathways within the model cyanobacterium Synechocystis sp. strain PCC 6803 implicates that cyanobacteria were not only the evolutionary origin of oxygenic photosynthesis but also ancient photorespiratory phosphoglycolate metabolism, which might have been conveyed endosymbiotically to plants.

Drawing on earlier research that indicated the presence of phosphoglycolic acid in algae through labeling of C^{14}O_{2} and P^{28}-orthophosphate, Richardson & Tolbert were the first to find a phosphatase activity specific for phosphoglycolate in tobacco leaves. The pH optimum of the enzyme is 6.3, and Mg^{2+} or Mn^{2+} ions as cofactors were necessary for activity. Mg^{2+} has been consistently noted to yield the maximum turnover rate. In other studies, Co^{2+} could also act as a divalent cofactor. In addition, Ca^{2+}, despite being divalent, inhibits phosphoglycolate phosphatase on levels of greater than 90% of its enzymatic activity by acting as a competitive inhibitor to Mg^{2+}. Finally, Cl^{−} can activate at low concentrations (up to 50mM), but at high concentrations, chloride ions will act as competitive inhibitors with respect to phosphoglycolate. The enzyme localizes to the chloroplast, and plant studies, involving C^{14}O_{2} fixation in the light, identified labeled glycolate outside of the chloroplast, suggesting that the activity of phosphoglycolate phosphatase allows the movement of glycolate out of the chloroplast.

When a photorespiratory mutant of the eukaryotic green alga Chlamydomonas reinhardtii was studied, the mutant strain was identified with a conditional lethal growth phenotype that required elevated concentrations of CO_{2} for growth. The observation of large phosphoglycolate accumulation and the absence of glycolate accumulation ruled out the possible cause of the absence or mutation of the CO_{2}-concentrating mechanism and indicated that phosphoglycolate phosphatase was most likely absent or deficient. The study concluded that the mutant phenotype arose from a phosphoglycolate phosphatase deficiency caused by a single-gene, nuclear mutation, which they subsequently named pgp1. The deficiency inhibited the photorespiratory metabolic pathway, and the subsequent buildup of phosphoglycolate inhibited the Calvin Cycle.

Since this initial study, three putative Phosphoglycolate phosphatase genes have been identified, PGP1, PGP2, and PGP3. Ensuing studies 20 years after the identification of the same mutant strain of Chlamydomonas reinhardtii found that the conditional lethal phenotype was no longer present despite the continued presence of the splice mutation of pgp1. Explanation of this occurrence concluded that the PGP2 gene was upregulated and most likely contributed to the phenotypic reversion in the pgp1 mutant.

Arabidopsis thaliana is the only plant with a known set of well-defined photorespiratory mutants. One of the is a knockout mutant that is devoid of 2PG phosphatase (PGLP). A high level of CO_{2} (1%), for example, is required for normal growth of those mutants. In normal low CO_{2} conditions, growth is strongly impaired.

=== Mammalian ===
Partial purification analysis has shown that human erythrocytes contain phosphoglycolate phosphatase as a cytoplasmic dimeric enzyme with molecular weight of 72,000. Approximately 5% of the enzyme's total activity is membrane-associated. It shows optimum pH of 6.7 and has a Michaelis constant of 1 mM for phosphoglycolate. The activity of the enzyme is Mg^{2+}-dependent. Co^{2+}, and to a smaller extent Mn^{2+}, may substitute for Mg^{2+}. However, it has shown that though the enzyme requires both free Mg^{2+} and phosphoglycolate, the Mg^{2+}-phosphoglycolate complex has inhibitory effects on enzymatic activity.

In 1977, Badwey first demonstrated phosphoglycolate phosphatase activity in human erythrocytes and speculated that the enzyme's activity may function to protect red cells from inadvertently formed phosphoglycolate, which is synthesized by pyruvate kinase. The implication of phosphoglycolate phosphatase's role in human red blood cells was discovered when its substrate, phosphoglycolate, was shown to be a potent activator of the enzyme 2,3-bisphosphoglycerate phosphatase(2,3-DPG), another hydrolase which catalyzes the metabolic reaction of 2,3-bisphosphoglycerate to 3-phosphoglycerate. In the presence of 0.02 mM phosphoglycolate, the phosphatase activity of 2,3-DPG is activated more than 1000-fold.

The implication of phosphoglycolate phosphatase in the regulation of 2,3-PGA suggests the importance of having a functional version of the enzyme. In all animal tissues, 2,3-PGA is important as the cofactor of the glycolytic enzyme, phosphoglycerate mutase. More important, the synthesis and breakdown of 2,3-PGA is critical to regulation of hemoglobin's binding affinity to oxygen, and an increase in its concentration leads to increased tissue oxygenation while a decrease may lead to tissue hypoxia. Therefore, the activation of the enzyme responsible for the metabolic breakdown of 2,3-PGA by phosphoglycolate could implicate phosphoglycolate phosphatase in the regulation of 2,3-PGA concentrations.

==== Human ====
Phosphoglycolate phosphatase exhibits electrophoretically distinctive variant forms. Found in all human tissues, including red cells, lymphocytes, and cultured fibroblasts, the highest enzymatic activity was noted within skeletal and cardiac muscle. Research into the genetic polymorphism indicates that PGP is likely determined by three alleles at a single autosomal locus, which is expressed in all human tissues. Preliminary observations of fetal tissue suggest that the PGP locus is also fully expressed during intrauterine life. Initial research has also shown appreciable genetic variation indicated by the detection of 6 phenotypes within a small European population.
