= Beneš =

Beneš (feminine: Benešová) is a Czech surname. The name originated as a pet form of the given names Benedikt and Benjamin. The Germanised form is Benesch and the Anglicised form is Benesh. Notable people with the surname include:

== Sports ==
- Alan Benes (born 1972), American baseball pitcher
- Andy Benes (born 1967), American baseball pitcher
- Hana Benešová (born 1975), Czech athlete
- Ivan Beneš (born 1960), Czech basketball player and coach
- Iveta Benešová (born 1983), Czech tennis player
- Jan Beneš (orienteer) (born 1987), Czech orienteer
- Ladislav Beneš (born 1943), Czech handball player
- Luděk Beneš (1937–2016), Czech slalom canoer
- Marijan Beneš (1951–2018), Bosnian boxer
- Petr Beneš (born 1974), Czech volleyball player
- Vít Beneš (born 1988), Czech footballer

== Other ==
- Bedrich Benes (born 1967), Czech-American computer scientist
- Bernardo Benes (1934-2019), Jewish Cuban lawyer, banker, journalist and civic leader
- Božena Benešová (1873–1936), Czech writer and poet
- Edvard Beneš (1884–1948), Czech politician, president of Czechoslovakia
- Emilie Beneš Brzezinski (1932–2022), Swiss-American sculptor
- Jan Beneš (writer) (1936–2007), Czech writer, translator and publicist
- Josef Beneš (1902–1984), Czech linguist
- Juraj Beneš (1940–2004), Slovak composer and pianist
- Libuše Benešová (born 1948), Czech politician
- Lubomír Beneš (1935–1995), Czech animator, director and author
- Marie Benešová (1948–2024), Czech politician and lawyer
- Pavel Beneš (1894–1956), Czech aircraft engineer
- Svatopluk Beneš (1918–2007), Czech actor
- Thomas A. Benes (1951–2014), American military leader
- Václav Beneš Třebízský (1849–1884), Czech novelist
- Václav E. Beneš (born 1931), Czech-American mathematician
- Vojta Beneš (1878–1951), Czech educator and political leader

== Fictional characters ==
- Elaine Benes, a character in Seinfeld
- Jan Benes, a character in Fantastic Voyage
- Sandra Benes, a character in Space: 1999

== See also ==
- Benešov (disambiguation)
