= Phosphoglycerate mutase 2 =

Enzyme found in humans

PGAM2

Identifiers
- Aliases: PGAM2, GSD10, PGAM-M, PGAMM, phosphoglycerate mutase 2
- External IDs: OMIM: 612931; MGI: 1933118; GeneCards: PGAM2
Enzyme activity
EC #	BRENDA	ExPASy	KEGG	MetaCyc
5.4.2.4	↗	↗	↗	↗
5.4.2.11	↗	↗	↗	↗

Gene location (Human)
Chr.	Chromosome 7 (human)
Band	7p13	Start	44,062,727 bp
Band	7p13	End	44,065,567 bp

Gene location (Mouse)
Chr.	Chromosome 11 (mouse)
Band	11|11 A1	Start	5,751,640 bp
Band	11|11 A1	End	5,753,733 bp
RNA expression pattern
Bgee	Human / Mouse (ortholog); Top expressed in: apex of heart; muscle of thigh; right auricle of heart; gastrocnemius muscle; muscle of arm; biceps brachii; triceps brachii muscle; Skeletal muscle tissue of biceps brachii; vastus lateralis muscle; left ventricle / Top expressed in: triceps brachii muscle; sternocleidomastoid muscle; extensor digitorum longus muscle; temporal muscle; muscle of thigh; digastric muscle; vastus lateralis muscle; tibialis anterior muscle; triceps surae; gastrocnemius muscle; More reference expression data
BioGPS	n/a
Gene ontology
Molecular function	intramolecular transferase activity, phosphotransferases; isomerase activity; bisphosphoglycerate mutase activity; catalytic activity; hydrolase activity; 2,3-bisphosphoglycerate-dependent phosphoglycerate mutase activity; phosphoglycerate mutase activity
Cellular component	cytosol; extracellular exosome; nucleus
Biological process	Notch signaling pathway; gluconeogenesis; glycolytic process; canonical glycolysis; spermatogenesis; response to inorganic substance; regulation of pentose-phosphate shunt; response to mercury ion; metabolism; striated muscle contraction
Sources:Amigo / QuickGO
Orthologs
Databases	NCBI: entry; OMA: entry
Species	Human	Mouse
Entrez	5224	56012
Ensembl	ENSG00000164708	ENSMUSG00000020475
UniProt	P15259	O70250
RefSeq (mRNA)	NM_000290	NM_018870
RefSeq (protein)	NP_000281	NP_061358
Location (UCSC)	Chr 7: 44.06 – 44.07 Mb	Chr 11: 5.75 – 5.75 Mb
PubMed search
- Wikidata
View/Edit Human	View/Edit Mouse

Phosphoglycerate mutase 2 (PGAM2), also known as muscle-specific phosphoglycerate mutase (PGAM-M), is a phosphoglycerate mutase that, in humans, is encoded by the PGAM2 gene on chromosome 7.

Phosphoglycerate mutase (PGAM) catalyzes the reversible reaction of 3-phosphoglycerate (3-PGA) to 2-phosphoglycerate (2-PGA) in the glycolytic pathway. The PGAM is a dimeric enzyme containing, in different tissues, different proportions of a slow-migrating muscle (MM) isozyme, a fast-migrating brain (BB) isozyme, and a hybrid form (MB). This gene encodes muscle-specific PGAM subunit. Mutations in this gene cause muscle phosphoglycerate mutase deficiency, also known as glycogen storage disease X.[provided by RefSeq, Sep 2009]

== Structure ==
PGAM2 is one of two genes in humans encoding a PGAM subunit, the other being PGAM1.

=== Gene ===
The PGAM2 gene is composed of three exons of lengths spanning 454, 180, and 202 bp, separated by two introns of 103 bp and 5.6 kb. Located 29 bp upstream of the transcription start site is a TATA box-like element, and 40 bp upstream of this element is an inverted CCAAT box element (ATTGG). Despite its muscle-specific expression, no muscle-specific consensus sequences were identified in the 5'-untranslated region of human PGAM2, though one consensus sequence has been proposed in rat and chicken. Unlike PGAM1, which is present as several copies in the human genome, only one copy of PGAM2 is found in the genome, indicating that this gene arose from gene duplication of and subsequent modifications in the PGAM1 gene.

=== Protein ===
The isozyme encoded by PGAM2 spans 253 residues, which demonstrates highly sequence similarity (81% identity) to the protein PGAM1. Both form either homo- or heterodimers. The MM homodimer is found primarily in adult muscle, while the MB heterodimer, composed of a subunit from each isozyme, is found in the heart.

One key residue in the active site of PGAM2, lysine 100 (K100), is highly conserved across bacteria, to yeast, plant, and mammals, indicating its evolutionary importance. K100 directly contacts the substrate (3-PGA) and intermediate (2,3-PGA); however, the acetylation of this residue under normal cellular conditions neutralizes its positive charge and interferes with this binding.

== Mechanism ==
PGAM2 catalyzes the 3-PG-to-2-PG isomerization via a 2-step process:

1. a phosphate group from the phosphohistidine in the active site is transferred to the C-2 carbon of 3-PGA to form 2,3-bisphosglycerate (2,3-PGA), and then
2. the phosphate group linked to the C-3 carbon of 2,3-PG is transferred to the catalytic histidine to form 2-PGA and regenerate the phosphohistidine.

== Function ==
PGAM2 is one of two PGAM subunits found in humans and is predominantly expressed in adult muscle. Both isozymes of PGAM are glycolytic enzymes that catalyze the reversible conversion of 3-PGA to 2-PGA using 2,3-bisphosphoglycerate as a cofactor. Since both 3-PGA and 2-PGA are allosteric regulators of the pentose phosphate pathway (PPP) and glycine and serine synthesis pathways, respectively, PGAM2 may contribute to the biosynthesis of amino acids, 5-carbon sugar, and nucleotides precursors.

== Clinical significance ==
PGAM activity is upregulated in cancers, including lung cancer, colon cancer, liver cancer, breast cancer, and leukemia. One possible mechanism involves the deacetylation of residue K100 in the PGAM active site by sirtuin 2 (SIRT2) under conditions of oxidative stress. This deacetylation activates PGAM activity, resulting in increased NADPH production and cell proliferation, and thus tumor growth.

In a patient with intolerance for strenuous exercise and persistent pigmenturia, PGAM2 activity was found to be decreased relative to other glycolytic enzymes. This PGAM2 deficiency results in a metabolic myopathy (glycogenosis type X) and has been traced to mutations in the PGAM2 gene. Currently, four mutations have been identified from African-American, Caucasian, and Japanese families. One G-to-A transition mutation in codon 78 produced a truncated protein product, while mutations at codons 89 and 90 may have disrupted the active site and resulted in an inactive protein product. Meanwhile, two patients heterozygous for the G97D mutation presented with exercise intolerance and muscle cramps.

== Interactions ==
PGAM2 is known to interact with:

- SIRT2.

== Interactive pathway map ==
Click on genes, proteins and metabolites below to link to respective articles. (Note: The interactive pathway map can be edited at WikiPathways: "GlycolysisGluconeogenesis_WP534".)

Glycolysis and Gluconeogenesis edit

== See also ==
- Phosphoglycerate mutase
- PGAM1
