= Benesch =

Benesch is a surname, a Germanized version of Czech surname Beneš. Notable people with the surname include:

- Leonie Benesch (born 1991), German actress
- Lynn Benesch (born 1940), American actress
- Kurt Benesch (1926–2008), Austrian writer
- Otto Benesch (1896–1964), Austrian historian
- Reinhold and Ruth Benesch (1919–1986 and 1925–2000), American biochemists
- Susan Benesch (born 1964), American journalist and scholar

== See also ==
- Wilson Benesch, British audio equipment manufacturer
