= 3-phosphoglyceroyl-phosphate—polyphosphate phosphotransferase =

Class of enzymes

3-phosphoglyceroyl-phosphate-polyphosphate phosphotransferase

Identifiers
- EC no.: 2.7.4.17
- CAS no.: 9055-36-1

Databases
- IntEnz: IntEnz view
- BRENDA: BRENDA entry
- ExPASy: NiceZyme view
- KEGG: KEGG entry
- MetaCyc: metabolic pathway
- PRIAM: profile
- PDB structures: RCSB PDB PDBe PDBsum
- Gene Ontology: AmiGO / QuickGO
Search
- PMC: articles
- PubMed: articles
- NCBI: proteins

In enzymology, a 3-phosphoglyceroyl-phosphate—polyphosphate phosphotransferase (EC 2.7.4.17) is an enzyme that catalyzes the chemical reaction

3-phospho-D-glyceroyl phosphate + (phosphate)n $\rightleftharpoons$ 3-phosphoglycerate + (phosphate)n^{+}1

Thus, the two substrates of this enzyme are 3-phospho-D-glyceroyl phosphate and (phosphate)n, whereas its two products are 3-phosphoglycerate and (phosphate)n+1.

This enzyme belongs to the family of transferases, specifically those transferring phosphorus-containing groups (phosphotransferases) with a phosphate group as acceptor. The systematic name of this enzyme class is 3-phospho-D-glyceroyl-phosphate:polyphosphate phosphotransferase. Other names in common use include diphosphoglycerate-polyphosphate phosphotransferase, and 1,3-diphosphoglycerate-polyphosphate phosphotransferase.
