= Glyceraldehyde-3-phosphate dehydrogenase (NAD(P)+) =

glyceraldehyde-3-phosphate dehydrogenase (NAD(P)+) (phosphorylating)

Identifiers
- EC no.: 1.2.1.59
- CAS no.: 39369-25-0

Databases
- IntEnz: IntEnz view
- BRENDA: BRENDA entry
- ExPASy: NiceZyme view
- KEGG: KEGG entry
- MetaCyc: metabolic pathway
- PRIAM: profile
- PDB structures: RCSB PDB PDBe PDBsum
- Gene Ontology: AmiGO / QuickGO
Search
- PMC: articles
- PubMed: articles
- NCBI: proteins

In enzymology, glyceraldehyde-3-phosphate dehydrogenase (NAD(P)+) (EC 1.2.1.59) is an enzyme that catalyzes the chemical reaction

D-glyceraldehyde-3-phosphate
+ NAD^{+}
P_{i}
H^{+}
P_{i}
H^{+}
1,3-bisphosphoglyceric acid
+ NADH

The three substrates of this enzyme are D-glyceraldehyde 3-phosphate, phosphate (P_{i}), and oxidised nicotinamide adenine dinucleotide (NAD^{+}). Its products are 1,3-bisphosphoglyceric acid, reduced NADH, and a proton. The enzyme can use nicotinamide adenine dinucleotide phosphate as an alternative cofactor.

This enzyme belongs to the family of oxidoreductases, specifically those acting on the aldehyde or oxo group of a donor with NAD+ or NADP+ as an acceptor. The systematic name of this enzyme class is D-glyceraldehyde 3-phosphate:NAD(P)+ oxidoreductase (phosphorylating). Other names in common use include triosephosphate dehydrogenase (NAD(P)) (phosphorylating), and glyceraldehyde-3-phosphate dehydrogenase (NAD(P)) (phosphorylating).

== Structural studies ==
As of late 2007, only one structure has been solved for this class of enzymes, with the PDB accession code 2CZC.

== See also ==
- Glyceraldehyde-3-phosphate dehydrogenase (phosphorylating) which catalyses the same reaction
