= Diphosphoglycerate =

Diphosphoglycerate may refer to:

- 1,3-Diphosphoglycerate
- 2,3-Diphosphoglycerate
