= C3H8O10P2 =

The molecular formula C_{3}H_{8}O_{10}P_{2} (molar mass: 266.035 g/mol) may refer to:

- 1,3-Bisphosphoglyceric acid (1,3-BPG)
- 2,3-Bisphosphoglyceric acid (2,3-BPG)
