= 2,3-bisphosphoglycerate 3-phosphatase =

Class of enzymes

Identifiers
- EC no.: 3.1.3.80

Databases
- BRENDA: enzyme data
- ExPASy: NiceZyme view
- KEGG: enzyme entry
- MetaCyc: metabolic pathway
- Rhea: reactions
- PDB structures: RCSB PDB PDBe PDBsum
Search
- PMC: articles
- PubMed: articles
- NCBI: proteins

2,3-Bisphosphoglycerate 3-phosphatase (EC 3.1.3.80, MIPP1, 2,3-BPG 3-phosphatase) is an enzyme with systematic name 2,3-bisphospho-D-glycerate 3-phosphohydrolase. It catalyses the following reaction:

2,3-bisphospho-D-glyceric acid
H_{2}O
P_{i}
2-phospho-D-glyceric acid

The enzyme characterised from Dictyostelium, birds, and mammals hydrolyses 2,3-bisphospho-D-glyceric acid to 2-phospho-D-glyceric acid and orthophosphate (P_{i}). The reaction is a shortcut in the Luebering-Rapoport pathway.
