= Mutase =

Protein

A mutase is an enzyme of the isomerase class that catalyzes the movement of a functional group from one position to another within the same molecule. In other words, mutases catalyze intramolecular group transfers. Examples of mutases include bisphosphoglycerate mutase, which appears in red blood cells and phosphoglycerate mutase, which is an enzyme integral to glycolysis. In glycolysis, it changes 3-phosphoglycerate to 2-phosphoglycerate by moving a single phosphate group within a single molecule.

== See also ==
- Phosphoglucomutase
- Methylmalonyl-CoA mutase
- Phosphoglycerate mutase
