= Phosphoglycerate mutase 1 =

Enzyme found in humans

PGAM1

Identifiers
- Aliases: PGAM1, HEL-S-35, PGAM-B, PGAMA, phosphoglycerate mutase 1
- External IDs: OMIM: 172250; MGI: 97552; GeneCards: PGAM1
Available structures
PDB	Ortholog search: PDBe RCSB
PDB	List of PDB id codes 1YFK, 1YJX, 4GPI, 4GPZ
Enzyme activity
EC #	BRENDA	ExPASy	KEGG	MetaCyc
5.4.2.4	↗	↗	↗	↗
5.4.2.11	↗	↗	↗	↗

Gene location (Human)
Chr.	Chromosome 10 (human)
Band	10q24.1	Start	97,426,191 bp
Band	10q24.1	End	97,433,444 bp

Gene location (Mouse)
Chr.	Chromosome 19 (mouse)
Band	19|19 C3	Start	41,900,362 bp
Band	19|19 C3	End	41,907,099 bp
RNA expression pattern
Bgee	Human / Mouse (ortholog); Top expressed in: superior frontal gyrus; dorsolateral prefrontal cortex; right frontal lobe; mucosa of esophagus; right adrenal gland; Brodmann area 9; anterior cingulate cortex; right adrenal cortex; left adrenal gland; hypothalamus / Top expressed in: tail of embryo; neural layer of retina; epiblast; embryo; cerebellar cortex; hippocampus proper; primary visual cortex; olfactory bulb; superior frontal gyrus; hypothalamus; More reference expression data
BioGPS	n/a
Gene ontology
Molecular function	intramolecular transferase activity, phosphotransferases; isomerase activity; bisphosphoglycerate mutase activity; protein binding; catalytic activity; hydrolase activity; protein kinase binding; 2,3-bisphosphoglycerate-dependent phosphoglycerate mutase activity; phosphoglycerate mutase activity
Cellular component	cytoplasm; cytosol; membrane; myelin sheath; extracellular exosome; extracellular region; secretory granule lumen; ficolin-1-rich granule lumen; nucleus
Biological process	gluconeogenesis; glycolytic process; canonical glycolysis; regulation of glycolytic process; respiratory burst; regulation of pentose-phosphate shunt; metabolism; neutrophil degranulation
Sources:Amigo / QuickGO
Orthologs
Databases	NCBI: entry; OMA: entry
Species	Human	Mouse
Entrez	5223	18648
Ensembl	ENSG00000171314	ENSMUSG00000011752
UniProt	P18669	Q9DBJ1
RefSeq (mRNA)	NM_002629; NM_001317079	NM_023418
RefSeq (protein)	NP_001304008; NP_002620	NP_075907
Location (UCSC)	Chr 10: 97.43 – 97.43 Mb	Chr 19: 41.9 – 41.91 Mb
PubMed search
- Wikidata
View/Edit Human	View/Edit Mouse

Phosphoglycerate mutase 1 is an enzyme that in humans is encoded by the PGAM1 gene. This enzyme functions as a phosphoglycerate mutase, and catalyzes a step of glycolysis (breaking down of glucose). This protein is notably expressed in the liver and brain, compared to phosphoglycerate mutase 2 which is mainly expressed in the muscles and heart.

== Function ==
As a phosphoglycerate mutase (5.4.2.11), this enzyme is able to catalyze the following reaction (in both directions):

(2R)-2-phosphoglycerate $\rightleftharpoons$ (2R)-3-phosphoglycerate

Despite its name, it is also able to function as a Bisphosphoglycerate mutase (EC 5.4.2.4) like its paralog BPGM:

(2R)-3-phospho-glyceroyl phosphate $\rightleftharpoons$ (2R)-2,3-bisphosphoglycerate + H^{+}
