= Benesh =

Benesh is a surname, an Anglicized version of the Czech surname Beneš. Notable people with the surname include:

- Bernard Benesh (1891–1964), American entomologist
- Joan Benesh (1920–2014), British ballet dancer
- Rudolf Benesh (1916–1975), British mathematician
- Andrew Benesh (born 1995), American beach volleyball player
