= Glyceraldehyde-3-phosphate dehydrogenase (NADP+) (phosphorylating) =

glyceraldehyde-3-phosphate dehydrogenase (NADP+) (phosphorylating)

Identifiers
- EC no.: 1.2.1.13
- CAS no.: 37250-87-6

Databases
- IntEnz: IntEnz view
- BRENDA: BRENDA entry
- ExPASy: NiceZyme view
- KEGG: KEGG entry
- MetaCyc: metabolic pathway
- PRIAM: profile
- PDB structures: RCSB PDB PDBe PDBsum
- Gene Ontology: AmiGO / QuickGO
Search
- PMC: articles
- PubMed: articles
- NCBI: proteins

In enzymology, glyceraldehyde-3-phosphate dehydrogenase (NADP+) (phosphorylating) (EC 1.2.1.13) is an enzyme that catalyzes the chemical reaction

D-glyceraldehyde-3-phosphate
+ NADP^{+}
P_{i}
H^{+}
P_{i}
H^{+}
1,3-bisphosphoglyceric acid
+ NADPH

The three substrates of this enzyme are D-glyceraldehyde 3-phosphate, phosphate (P_{i}), and oxidised nicotinamide adenine dinucleotide phosphate (NADP^{+}). Its products are 1,3-bisphosphoglyceric acid, reduced NADPH, and a proton.

== Function ==
This enzyme belongs to the family of oxidoreductases, specifically those acting on the aldehyde or oxo group of donor with NAD+ or NADP+ as acceptor. This enzyme participates in the Calvin cycle which is an autotrophic carbon fixation pathway.

== Nomenclature ==
The systematic name of this enzyme class is D-glyceraldehyde-3-phosphate:NADP+ oxidoreductase (phosphorylating). Other names in common use include:

- dehydrogenase, glyceraldehyde phosphate (nicotinamide adenine dinucleotide phosphate) (phosphorylating)
- GAPDH
- glyceraldehyde phosphate dehydrogenase (nicotinamide adenine dinucleotide phosphate) (phosphorylating)
- glyceraldehyde-3-phosphate dehydrogenase (NADP) (phosphorylating)
- NADP-dependent glyceraldehyde phosphate dehydrogenase
- NADP-glyceraldehyde phosphate dehydrogenase
- NADP-glyceraldehyde-3-phosphate dehydrogenase
- NADP-triose phosphate dehydrogenase
- triosephosphate dehydrogenase (NADP)

== See also ==
- Glyceraldehyde-3-phosphate dehydrogenase (phosphorylating) which catalyses the same reaction using nicotinamide adenine dinucleotide as its cofactor
