= HRU =

Hru or HRU may refer to:

- HRU (security), a computer security model
- Human Resources University, part of the United States Office of Personnel Management
- Herington Regional Airport, in Kansas, United States
- Hruso languages, a proposed language family
- Hru, a minor Enochian angel
- Heavies Removal Unit A Unit in Natural-gas processing that removes C3+ Hydrocarbons from the Feed Gas
- Sigma Aquilae, a star with the modern name Hru
