= Glyceraldehyde-3-phosphate dehydrogenase (phosphorylating) =

glyceraldehyde-3-phosphate dehydrogenase (phosphorylating)

Identifiers
- EC no.: 1.2.1.12
- CAS no.: 9001-50-7

Databases
- IntEnz: IntEnz view
- BRENDA: BRENDA entry
- ExPASy: NiceZyme view
- KEGG: KEGG entry
- MetaCyc: metabolic pathway
- PRIAM: profile
- PDB structures: RCSB PDB PDBe PDBsum
- Gene Ontology: AmiGO / QuickGO
Search
- PMC: articles
- PubMed: articles
- NCBI: proteins

In enzymology, glyceraldehyde-3-phosphate dehydrogenase (phosphorylating) (EC 1.2.1.12) is an enzyme that catalyzes the chemical reaction

D-glyceraldehyde-3-phosphate
+ NAD^{+}
P_{i}
H^{+}
P_{i}
H^{+}
1,3-bisphosphoglyceric acid
+ NADH

The three substrates of this enzyme are D-glyceraldehyde-3-phosphate, phosphate (P_{i}), and oxidised nicotinamide adenine dinucleotide (NAD^{+}). Its products are 1,3-bisphosphoglyceric acid, reduced NADH, and a proton. This enzyme participates in glycolysis and gluconeogenesis.

== Nomenclature ==
This enzyme belongs to the family of oxidoreductases, specifically those acting on the aldehyde or oxo group of donor with NAD+ or NADP+ as acceptor. The systematic name of this enzyme class is D-glyceraldehyde-3-phosphate:NAD+ oxidoreductase (phosphorylating). Other names in common use include triosephosphate dehydrogenase, dehydrogenase, glyceraldehyde phosphate, phosphoglyceraldehyde dehydrogenase, 3-phosphoglyceraldehyde dehydrogenase, NAD+-dependent glyceraldehyde phosphate dehydrogenase, glyceraldehyde phosphate dehydrogenase (NAD+), glyceraldehyde-3-phosphate dehydrogenase (NAD+), NADH-glyceraldehyde phosphate dehydrogenase, and glyceraldehyde-3-P-dehydrogenase.

== See also ==
- Glyceraldehyde-3-phosphate dehydrogenase (NADP+) (phosphorylating) which catalyses the same reaction using nicotinamide adenine dinucleotide phosphate as its cofactor
