= PGAM5 =

Protein-coding gene in the species Homo sapiens

Identifiers
- Aliases: PGAM5, BXLBV68, PGAM family member 5, mitochondrial serine/threonine protein phosphatase
- External IDs: OMIM: 614939; MGI: 1919792; GeneCards: PGAM5
Available structures
PDB	Ortholog search: PDBe RCSB
PDB	List of PDB id codes 3MXO, 3O0T
Enzyme activity
EC #	BRENDA	ExPASy	KEGG	MetaCyc
3.1.3.16	↗	↗	↗	↗

Gene location (Human)
Chr.	Chromosome 12 (human)
Band	12q24.33	Start	132,710,819 bp
Band	12q24.33	End	132,722,734 bp

Gene location (Mouse)
Chr.	Chromosome 5 (mouse)
Band	5|5 F	Start	110,406,996 bp
Band	5|5 F	End	110,417,779 bp
RNA expression pattern
Bgee	Human / Mouse (ortholog); Top expressed in: gastrocnemius muscle; mucosa of transverse colon; muscle of thigh; right adrenal gland; islet of Langerhans; right lobe of liver; appendix; left adrenal gland; right adrenal cortex; left adrenal cortex / Top expressed in: superior cervical ganglion; endocardial cushion; interventricular septum; mandibular prominence; neural tube; medial ganglionic eminence; barrel cortex; maxillary prominence; piriform cortex; subiculum; More reference expression data
BioGPS	n/a
Gene ontology
Molecular function	phosphatase activity; phosphoprotein phosphatase activity; hydrolase activity; GTPase activator activity; protein binding; protein-containing complex binding; protein serine/threonine phosphatase activity
Cellular component	integral component of membrane; membrane; mitochondrion; mitochondrial outer membrane
Biological process	protein dephosphorylation; necroptosis; programmed cell death; dephosphorylation; positive regulation of GTPase activity; macroautophagy; negative regulation of cold-induced thermogenesis
Sources:Amigo / QuickGO
Orthologs
Databases	NCBI: entry; OMA: entry
Species	Human	Mouse
Entrez	192111	72542
Ensembl	ENSG00000247077	ENSMUSG00000029500
UniProt	Q96HS1	Q8BX10
RefSeq (mRNA)	NM_138575; NM_001170543; NM_001170544	NM_001163538; NM_028273
RefSeq (protein)	NP_001164014; NP_001164015; NP_612642	NP_001157010; NP_082549
Location (UCSC)	Chr 12: 132.71 – 132.72 Mb	Chr 5: 110.41 – 110.42 Mb
PubMed search
- Wikidata
View/Edit Human	View/Edit Mouse

PGAM family member 5 (PGAM5), also known as mitochondrial Serine/threonine-protein phosphatase PGAM5, is related to phosphoglycerate mutase family. It, in humans, is encoded by the PGAM5 gene on chromosome 12.
