= Benešov nad Černou =

- Municipality
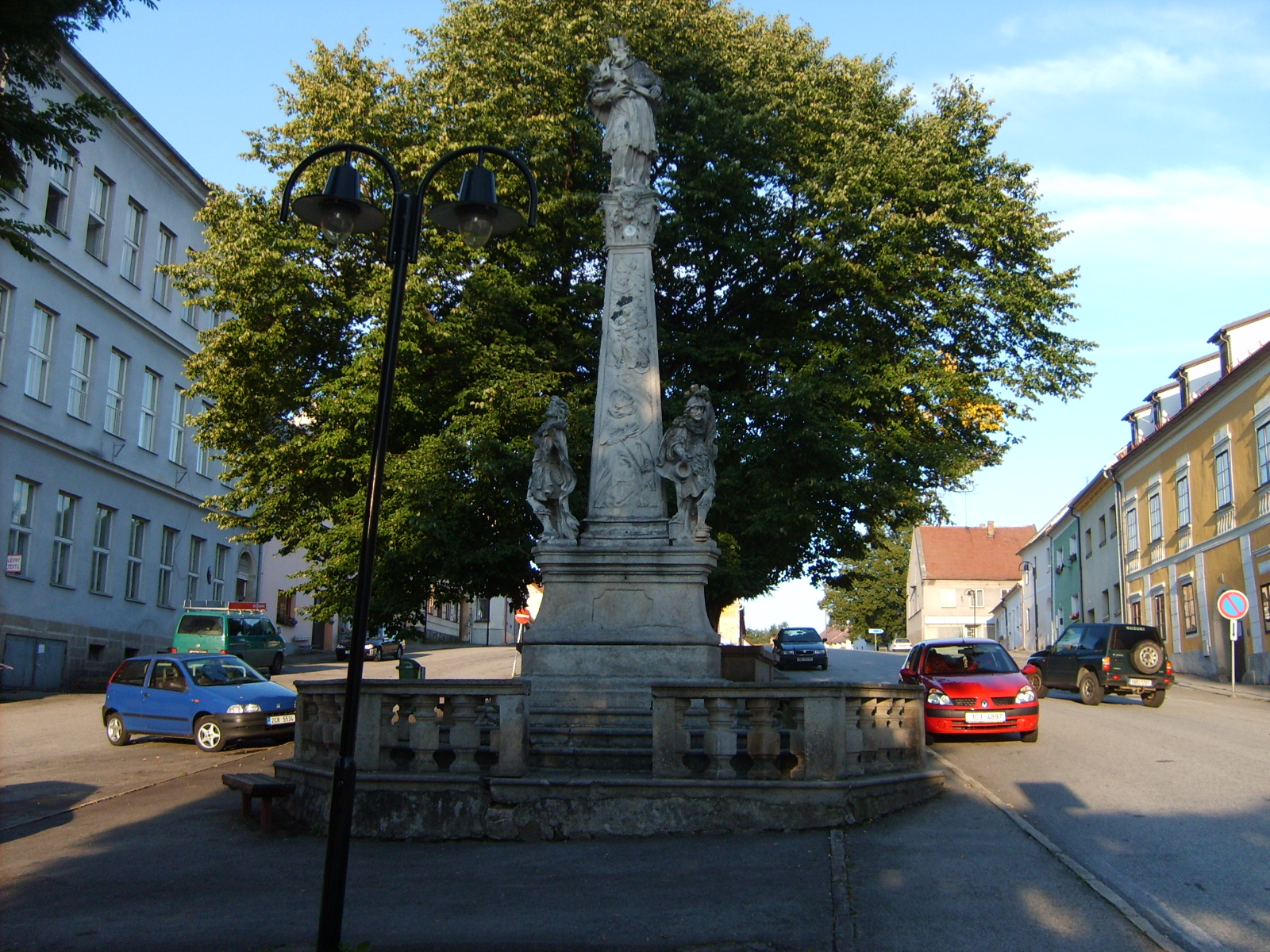
- Centre of Benešov nad Černou

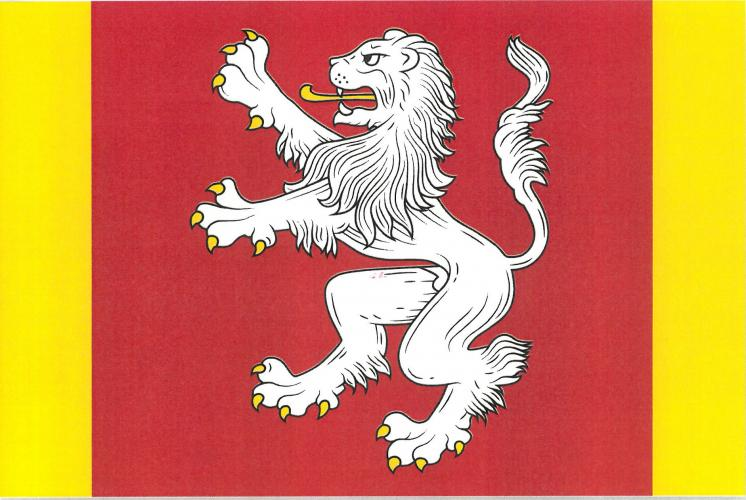
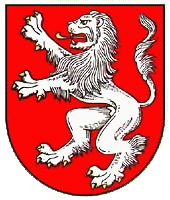
- Flag Coat of arms

- Location in the Czech Republic
- Coordinates: 48°43′46″N 14°37′39″E
- Country: Czech Republic
- Region: South Bohemian
- District: Český Krumlov
- First mentioned: 1332

Area
  - Total: 57.10 km^{2} (22.05 sq mi)
- Elevation: 661 m (2,169 ft)

Population (2026-01-01)
  - Total: 1,366
  - Density: 23.92/km^{2} (61.96/sq mi)
- Time zone: UTC+1 (CET)
  - Summer (DST): UTC+2 (CEST)
- Postal code: 382 82
- Website: www.benesovnc.cz

Benešov nad Černou (until 1948 Německý Benešov; German: Deutsch Beneschau) is a municipality and village in Český Krumlov District in the South Bohemian Region of the Czech Republic. It has about 1,400 inhabitants. The centre of Benešov nad Černou is well preserved and is protected as an urban monument zone.

== Administrative division ==
Benešov nad Černou consists of 13 municipal parts (in brackets population according to the 2021 census):

- Benešov nad Černou (1,058)
- Černé Údolí (19)
- Daleké Popelice (7)
- Děkanské Skaliny (18)
- Dluhoště (42)
- Hartunkov (49)
- Klení (101)
- Kuří (36)
- Ličov (54)
- Pusté Skaliny (2)
- Valtéřov (13)
- Velké Skaliny (38)
- Velký Jindřichov (5)

== Etymology ==
The name Benešov is derived from the personal name Beneš, meaning "Beneš's (court)".

== Geography ==
Benešov nad Černou is located about 24 kilometres (15 mi) east of Český Krumlov and 28 km (17 mi) south of České Budějovice. It lies on the border between the Gratzen Mountains and Gratzen Foothills. The highest point is at 881 m (2,890 ft) above sea level. The Černá River flows through the municipality. There are several fishponds in the municipal territory, the largest of which is Velký Klenský rybník.

== History ==
The first written mention of Benešov is from 1332. It was founded in the second half of the 13th century as a settlement by a fortress. It was named after its founder, the nobleman Beneš of Michalovice. In 1383, Benešov was promoted to a market town. In 1387, it was purchased by Oldřich I of Rosenberg and joined to the Nové Hrady estate.

As a result of frequent fires (in 1617, 1801, 1849, 1863 and 1891), the medieval character of Benešov was destroyed. In 1881, Benešov became a town and its name changed to Německý Benešov ('German Benešov'). After World War II, the German-speaking population was expelled and the town depopulated. In 1946, the name changed to Benešov nad Černou after the local watercourse Černá. In 1950, the municipality lost its town status.

== Demographics ==
Historical population

Year	Pop.	±%
1869	4,336	—
1880	4,517	+4.2%
1890	4,626	+2.4%
1900	4,701	+1.6%
1910	4,579	−2.6%

Year	Pop.	±%
1921	4,209	−8.1%
1930	3,631	−13.7%
1950	1,764	−51.4%
1961	1,767	+0.2%
1970	1,441	−18.4%

Year	Pop.	±%
1980	1,246	−13.5%
1991	1,150	−7.7%
2001	1,237	+7.6%
2011	1,404	+13.5%
2021	1,442	+2.7%

Source: Censuses

== Transport ==
There are no railways or major roads passing through the municipality.

== Sights ==
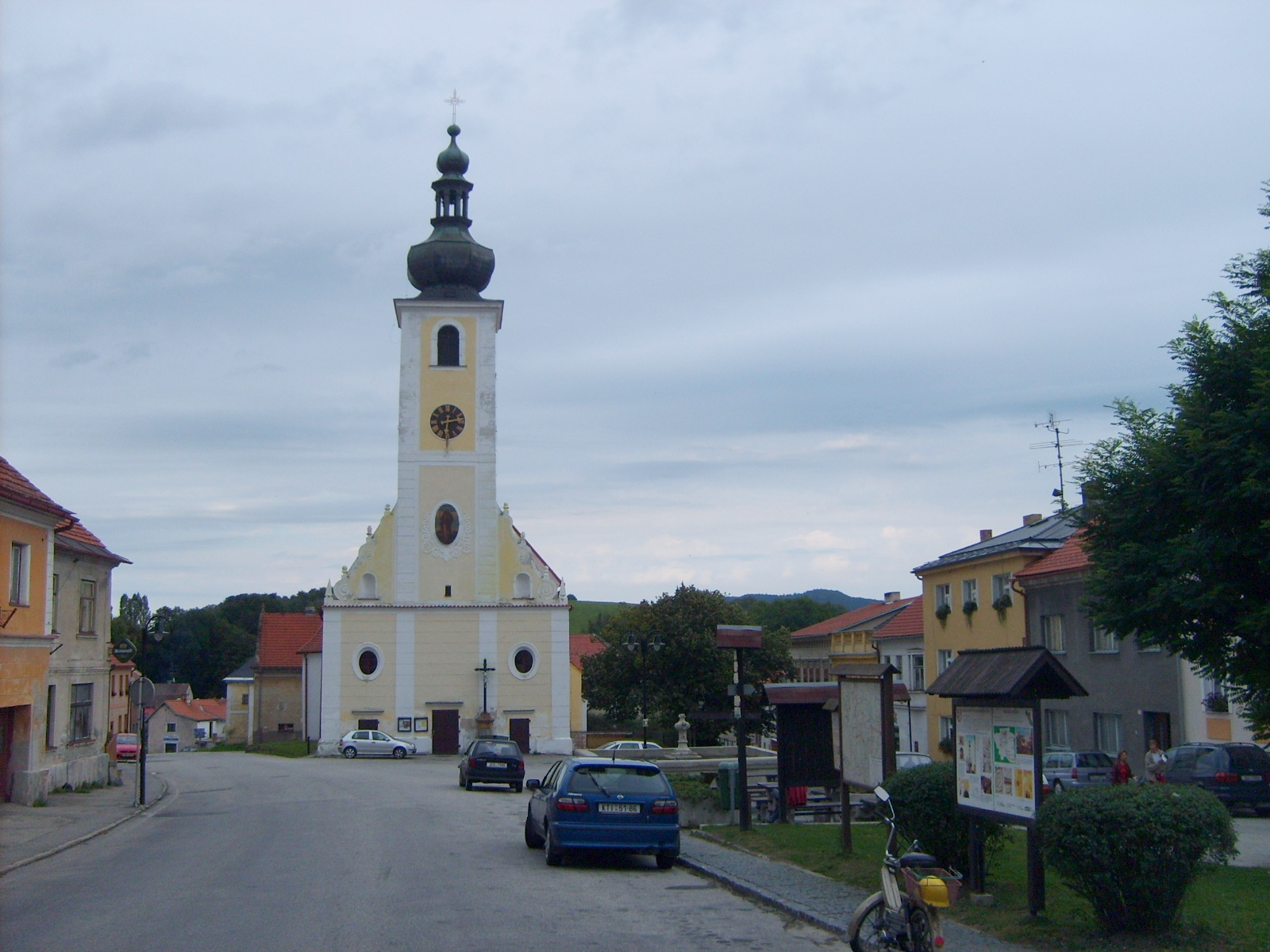
Church of Saint James the Great

The main landmark of Benešov nad Černou is the Church of Saint James the Great. It was originally built in the Gothic style in 1332. Around 1630, it was rebuilt to its present form.

A valuable monuments is the town hall. It is a Gothic-Renaissance house dating from 1594.

In Benešov nad Černou is a set of three granite fountains from the second half of the 19th century. Two of them are located on the town square and one is near the primary school.

The Church of Saint Lawrence is located in Klení. It was built in the early Gothic style at the end of the 13th century. Around 1490, it was reconstructed.
