= Benešov (disambiguation) =

Benešov is a town in the Central Bohemian Region of the Czech Republic.

Benešov may also refer to places in the Czech Republic:

- Benešov (Blansko District), a municipality and village in the South Moravian Region
- Benešov, a village and part of Broumov in the Hradec Králové Region
- Benešov, a village and part of Černovice (Pelhřimov District) in the Vysočina Region
- Benešov nad Černou, a municipality and village in the South Bohemian Region
- Benešov nad Ploučnicí, a town in the Ústí nad Labem Region
- Benešov u Semil, a municipality and village in the Liberec Region
- Dolní Benešov, a town in the Moravian-Silesian Region
- Horní Benešov, a town in the Moravian-Silesian Region, until 1926 named just Benešov
