= Bisphosphoglycerate mutase =

Enzyme found in humans

BPGM
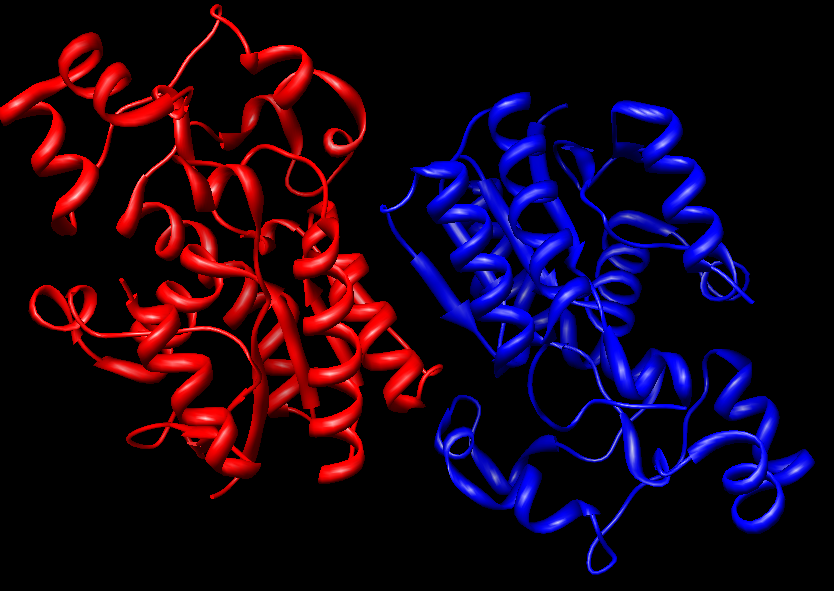
- Crystallographic structure of dimeric human bisphosphoglycerate mutase

Identifiers
- Aliases: BPGM, DPGM, bisphosphoglycerate mutase, ECYT8
- External IDs: OMIM: 613896; MGI: 1098242; GeneCards: BPGM
Available structures
PDB	Ortholog search: PDBe RCSB
PDB	List of PDB id codes 2H4Z, 1T8P, 2H4X, 2H52, 2F90, 2HHJ, 2A9J, 3NFY
Enzyme activity
EC #	BRENDA	ExPASy	KEGG	MetaCyc
5.4.2.4	↗	↗	↗	↗
5.4.2.11	↗	↗	↗	↗

Gene location (Human)
Chr.	Chromosome 7 (human)
Band	7q33	Start	134,646,811 bp
Band	7q33	End	134,679,816 bp

Gene location (Mouse)
Chr.	Chromosome 6 (mouse)
Band	6|6 B1	Start	34,476,207 bp
Band	6|6 B1	End	34,505,613 bp
RNA expression pattern
Bgee	Human / Mouse (ortholog); Top expressed in: secondary oocyte; amniotic fluid; trabecular bone; placenta; monocyte; bone marrow; stromal cell of endometrium; bone marrow cell; ganglionic eminence; C1 segment / Top expressed in: blood; secondary oocyte; seminal vesicula; zygote; primary oocyte; tibiofemoral joint; fetal liver hematopoietic progenitor cell; external carotid artery; spleen; supraoptic nucleus; More reference expression data
BioGPS	n/a
Gene ontology
Molecular function	bisphosphoglycerate mutase activity; intramolecular transferase activity, phosphotransferases; hydrolase activity; isomerase activity; catalytic activity; 2,3-bisphosphoglycerate-dependent phosphoglycerate mutase activity; phosphoglycerate mutase activity
Cellular component	extracellular exosome; cytosol
Biological process	regulation of pentose-phosphate shunt; gluconeogenesis; metabolism; glycolytic process; respiratory gaseous exchange by respiratory system; canonical glycolysis; carbohydrate metabolic process; erythrocyte development
Sources:Amigo / QuickGO
Orthologs
Databases	NCBI: entry; OMA: entry
Species	Human	Mouse
Entrez	669	12183
Ensembl	ENSG00000172331	ENSMUSG00000038871
UniProt	P07738	P15327
RefSeq (mRNA)	NM_001293085; NM_001724; NM_199186	NM_007563
RefSeq (protein)	NP_001280014; NP_001715; NP_954655	NP_031589; NP_001350637; NP_001350638; NP_001350639
Location (UCSC)	Chr 7: 134.65 – 134.68 Mb	Chr 6: 34.48 – 34.51 Mb
PubMed search
- Wikidata
View/Edit Human	View/Edit Mouse

bisphosphoglycerate mutase
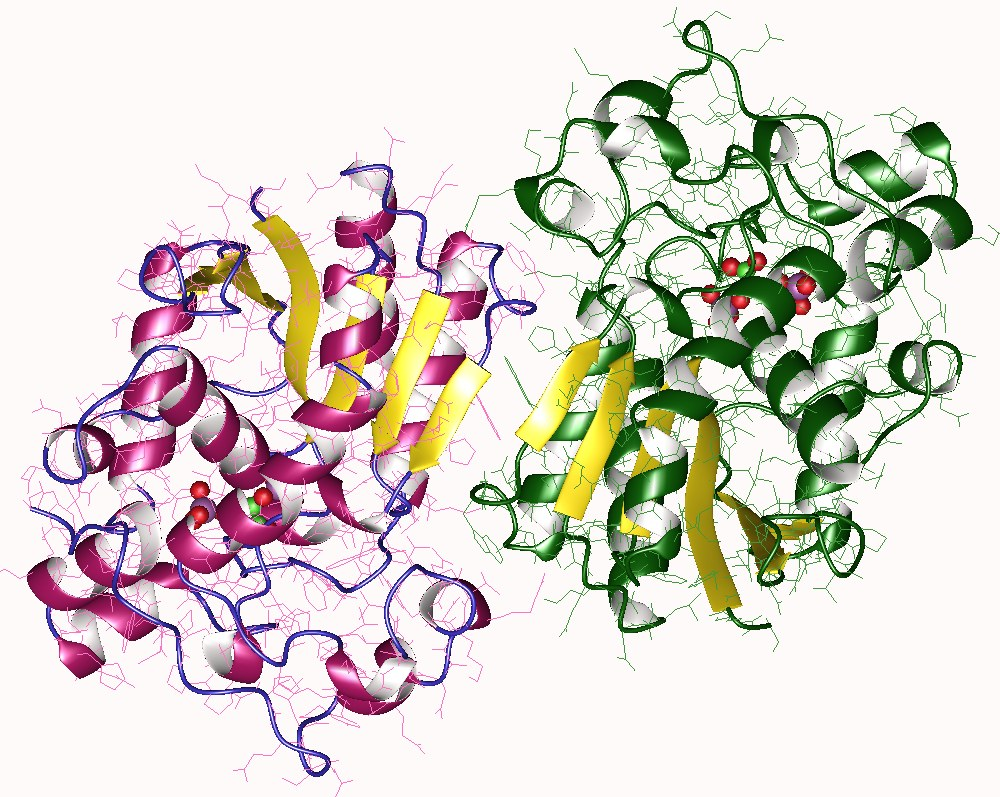
- Bisphosphoglycerate mutase homodimer, Human

Identifiers
- EC no.: 5.4.2.4
- CAS no.: 37211-69-1

Databases
- BRENDA: enzyme data
- ExPASy: NiceZyme view
- KEGG: enzyme entry
- MetaCyc: metabolic pathway
- Rhea: reactions
- PDB structures: RCSB PDB PDBe PDBsum
- Gene Ontology: AmiGO / QuickGO
Search
- PMC: articles
- PubMed: articles
- NCBI: proteins

Bisphosphoglycerate mutase (EC 5.4.2.4) is an enzyme that in humans is encoded by the BPGM gene. It is expressed in erythrocytes and placental cells. It is responsible for the catalytic synthesis of 2,3-Bisphosphoglycerate (2,3-BPG) from 1,3-bisphosphoglycerate. BPGM has both a mutase and a phosphatase function, but these are much less active, in contrast to its glycolytic cousin, phosphoglycerate mutase (PGM), which favors these two functions, but can also catalyze the synthesis of 2,3-BPG to a lesser extent.

== Tissue distribution ==
Because the main function of bisphosphoglycerate mutase is the synthesis of 2,3-BPG, this enzyme is found only in erythrocytes and placental cells. In glycolysis, converting 1,3-BPG to 2,3-BPG bypasses the ATP-generating phosphoglycerate kinase reaction, consequently, no net ATP is generated when glucose is metabolized through the Luebering–Rapoport pathway. Since the main role of 2,3-BPG is to shift the equilibrium of hemoglobin toward the deoxy-state, its production is really only useful in the cells which contain hemoglobin, such as erythrocytes and placental cells.

== Function ==
1,3-BPG is formed as an intermediate in glycolysis. BPGM then takes this and converts it to 2,3-BPG, which serves an important function in oxygen transport. 2,3-BPG binds with high affinity to Hemoglobin, causing a conformational change that results in the release of oxygen. Local tissues can then pick up the free oxygen. This is also important in the placenta, where fetal and maternal blood come within such close proximity. With the placenta producing 2,3-BPG, a large amount of oxygen is released from nearby maternal hemoglobin, which can then dissociate and bind with fetal hemoglobin, which has a much lower affinity for 2,3-BPG.

== Structure ==
=== Overview ===
BPGM is a dimer composed of two identical protein subunits, each with its own active site. Each subunit consists six β-strands, β A-F, and ten α-helices, α 1–10. Dimerization occurs along the faces of β C and α 3 of both monomers. BPGM is roughly 50% identical to its PGM counterpart, with the main active-site residues conserved in nearly all PGMs and BPGMs.

=== Important residues ===
- His^{11}: the nucleophile of the 1,2-BPG to 1,3-BPG reaction. Rotates back and forth with the help of His-188 to get in an in-line position in order to attack the 1’ phosphate group.
- His-188: involved in overall stability of protein, as well as hydrogen bonding to substrate, as His-11, which it pulls into its catalytic position.
- Arg^{90}: although not involved directly in binding, this positively charged residue is essential to overall stability of the protein. Can be substituted with Lysine with little effect on catalysis.
- Cys^{23}: has little effect on overall structure, but large effect on reactivity of the enzyme.
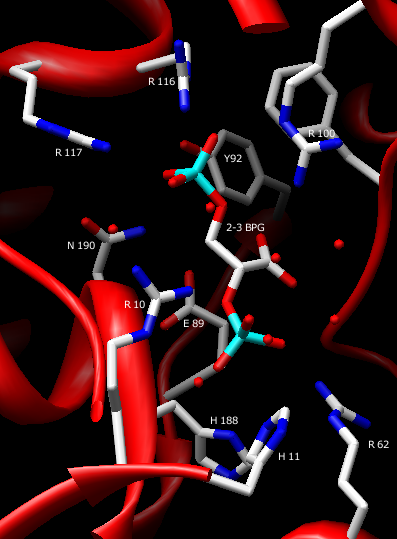
2-3 Bisphosphoglycerate in the active site of Bisphosphoglycerate Mutase. Depicted and labeled are the residues that assist in holding the substrate in place: Arg^{10}, Arg^{62}, Arg^{100}, Arg^{116}, Arg^{117}, His^{11}, His^{188}, Tyr^{92}, Asn^{190}, Glu^{89}.

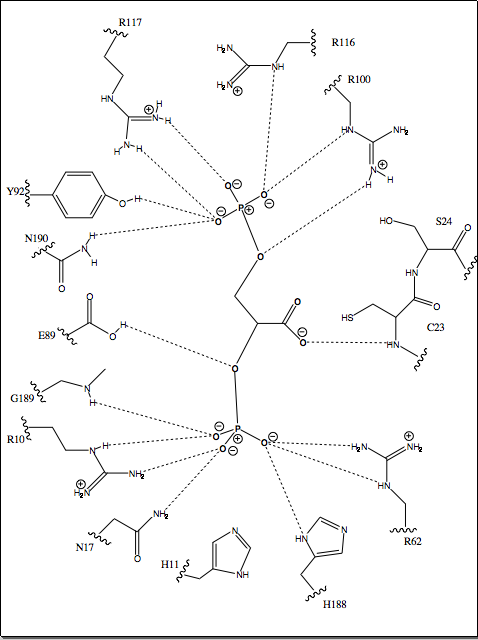
2-D depiction of all residues in active site that help hold the substrate in the proper position for mutation.

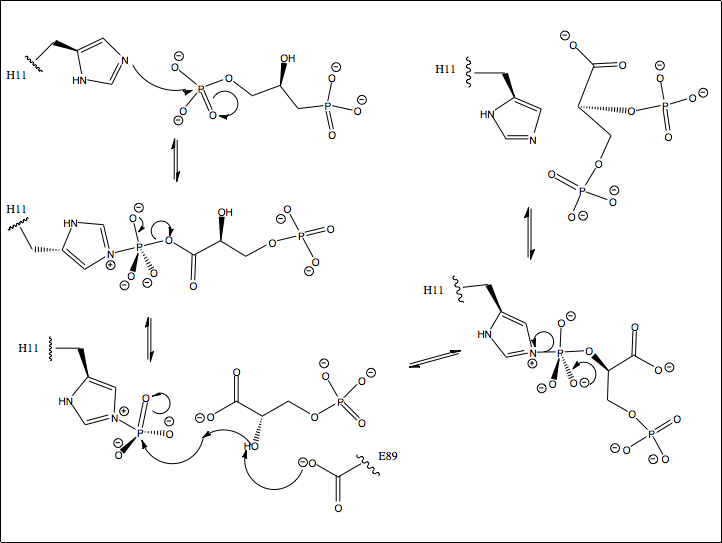
Mechanism for conversion of 1-3BPG to 2-3 BPG.

== Mechanism of catalysis ==
1,3-BPG binds to the active site, which causes a conformational change, in which the cleft around the active site closes in on the substrate, securely locking it in place. 1,3-BPG forms a large number of hydrogen bonds to the surrounding residues, many which are positively charged, severely restricting its mobility. Its rigidity suggests a very enthalpically driven association. Conformational changes cause His^{11} to rotate, partially aided by hydrogen bonding to His^{188}. His^{11} is brought in–line with the phosphate group, and then goes through an S_{N}2 mechanism in which His^{11} is the nucleophile that attacks the phosphate group. The 2’ hydroxy group then attacks the phosphate and removes it from His^{11}, thereby creating 2,3-BPG.
