= Thomas A. Benes =

United States Marine Corps general

Thomas Anthony Benes
- Born: June 8, 1951; Milwaukee, Wisconsin, U.S.
- Died: September 30, 2014 (aged 63); Bethesda, Maryland, U.S.
- Burial place: Swainsboro City Cemetery
- Military career
- Allegiance: United States of America
- Branch: United States Marine Corps
- Service years: 1974–2009
- Rank: Major General
- Conflicts: Gulf War; Operation Iraqi Freedom; War in Afghanistan
- Awards: Defense Superior Service Medal; Legion of Merit; Bronze Star Medal; Defense Meritorious Service Medal (4)

Thomas Anthony Benes (June 8, 1951 – September 30, 2014) was a major general in the United States Marine Corps.

== Career ==
After graduating from the University of Wisconsin–Madison, he was commissioned through the Platoon Leaders Class program in May 1974, attended The Basic School, and was designated a Naval Aviator in March 1976. He met his wife, Betty Jean (Bishop) Benes, in 1979 while stationed at Beaufort, South Carolina.

Benes' 35-year career involved duty in Yuma, Arizona; Quantico, Virginia; El Toro, California; Washington D.C.; Naples, Italy and Southern Europe. Benes was a graduate of the United States Navy Strike Fighter Tactics Instructor program, flew the F-4 Phantom II jet fighter and the F/A-18 Hornet Strike Fighter, and taught both weapons and tactics. During Operation Desert Storm, he flew 46 combat missions over Iraq and provided air defense over the Persian Gulf.

Assignments he was given include serving as president of the Marine Corps University and commanding general of the United States Marine Corps Training and Education Command. During his tour at MCU, he was assigned temporary duty as chief of staff of Combined Forces Land Component Commander, Camp Doha, Kuwait and participated in Operations Iraqi Freedom and Enduring Freedom. His served his final tour on active duty as the director of the Expeditionary Warfare Division at the Pentagon. He retired in 2009.

Awards he received include the Legion of Merit, the Bronze Star Medal, the Defense Meritorious Service Medal three award stars, the Air Medal with valor device and four strike/flight numerals, the Joint Service Commendation Medal, and the Navy Achievement Medal.

Benes died on September 30, 2014, at age 63. He had been receiving treatment for myelodysplastic syndrome at the Walter Reed National Military Medical Center in Bethesda, Maryland.

== Education ==
- B.S. – mechanical engineering, University of Wisconsin–Madison
- M.P.A. – George Washington University
