= Luebering–Rapoport pathway =

Chemical reaction making 2,3-BPG

In biochemistry, the Luebering–Rapoport pathway (also called the Luebering–Rapoport shunt) is a metabolic pathway in mature erythrocytes involving the formation of 2,3-bisphosphoglycerate (2,3-BPG), which regulates oxygen release from hemoglobin and delivery to tissues. 2,3-BPG, the reaction product of the Luebering–Rapoport pathway was first described and isolated in 1925 by the Austrian biochemist Samuel Mitja Rapoport and his technical assistant Jane Luebering.

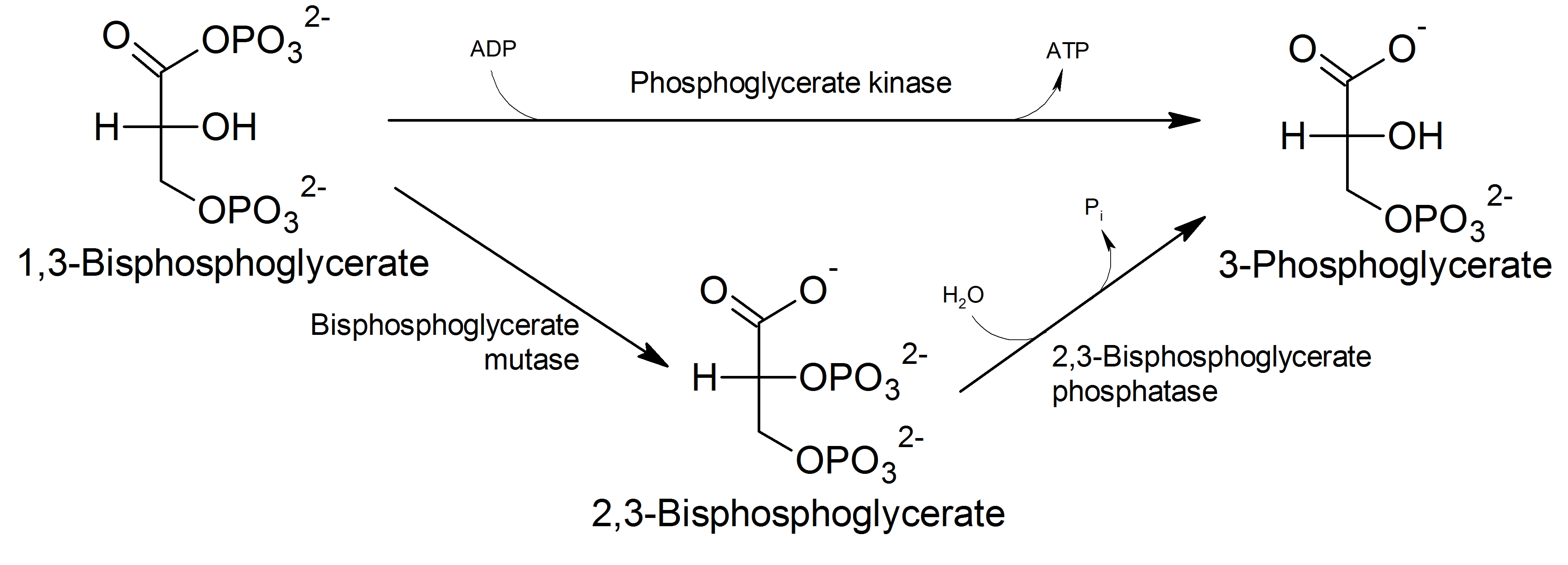

Through the Luebering–Rapoport pathway bisphosphoglycerate mutase catalyzes the transfer of a phosphoryl group from C1 to C2 of 1,3-BPG, giving 2,3-BPG. 2,3-bisphosphoglycerate, the most concentrated organophosphate in the erythrocyte, forms 3-PG by the action of bisphosphoglycerate phosphatase. The concentration of 2,3-BPG varies proportionately with the pH, since it is inhibitory to catalytic action of bisphosphoglycerate mutase. Under physiological conditions, the flux through the Rapoport-Luebering shunt is 19% of the main glycolytic flux.
