= Ivan Beneš =

Czech basketball player

Ivan Beneš (born 17 February 1960 in Prague) is a Czech former basketball player and currently coach of the Czech national team, which he coached at the EuroBasket Women 2017.
