= Phosphoglycerate mutase =

Class of enzymes

Identifiers
- EC no.: 5.4.2.11

Databases
- BRENDA: enzyme data
- ExPASy: NiceZyme view
- KEGG: enzyme entry
- MetaCyc: metabolic pathway
- Rhea: reactions
- PDB structures: RCSB PDB PDBe PDBsum
Search
- PMC: articles
- PubMed: articles
- NCBI: proteins

Phosphoglycerate mutase family

Identifiers
- Symbol: PGAM
- Pfam: PF00300
- InterPro: IPR013078
- PROSITE: PDOC00158
- SCOP2: 3pgm / SCOPe / SUPFAM
Available protein structures:
- PDB: 1e59A:5-191 1e58A:5-191 1yjxD:5-193 1yfkA:5-193 1ljdA:5-193 1fztA:9-170 4pgmB:3-189 3pgmB:3-189 1qhfA:3-189 1bq3B:3-189 1bq4B:3-189 1riiA:6-190 1t8pA:5-195 1h2eA:2-151 1h2fA:2-151 1ebbA:2-151 2bifA:251-398 3bifA:251-398 1bif :251-398 1k6mB:253-400 1c80A:253-400 1c7zA:253-400 1fbtB:253-400 1c81A:253-400 2axnA:248-395 1ujcA:2-115 1ujbA:2-115 IPR013078 PF00300 (ECOD; PDBsum)
- AlphaFold: IPR013078; PF00300

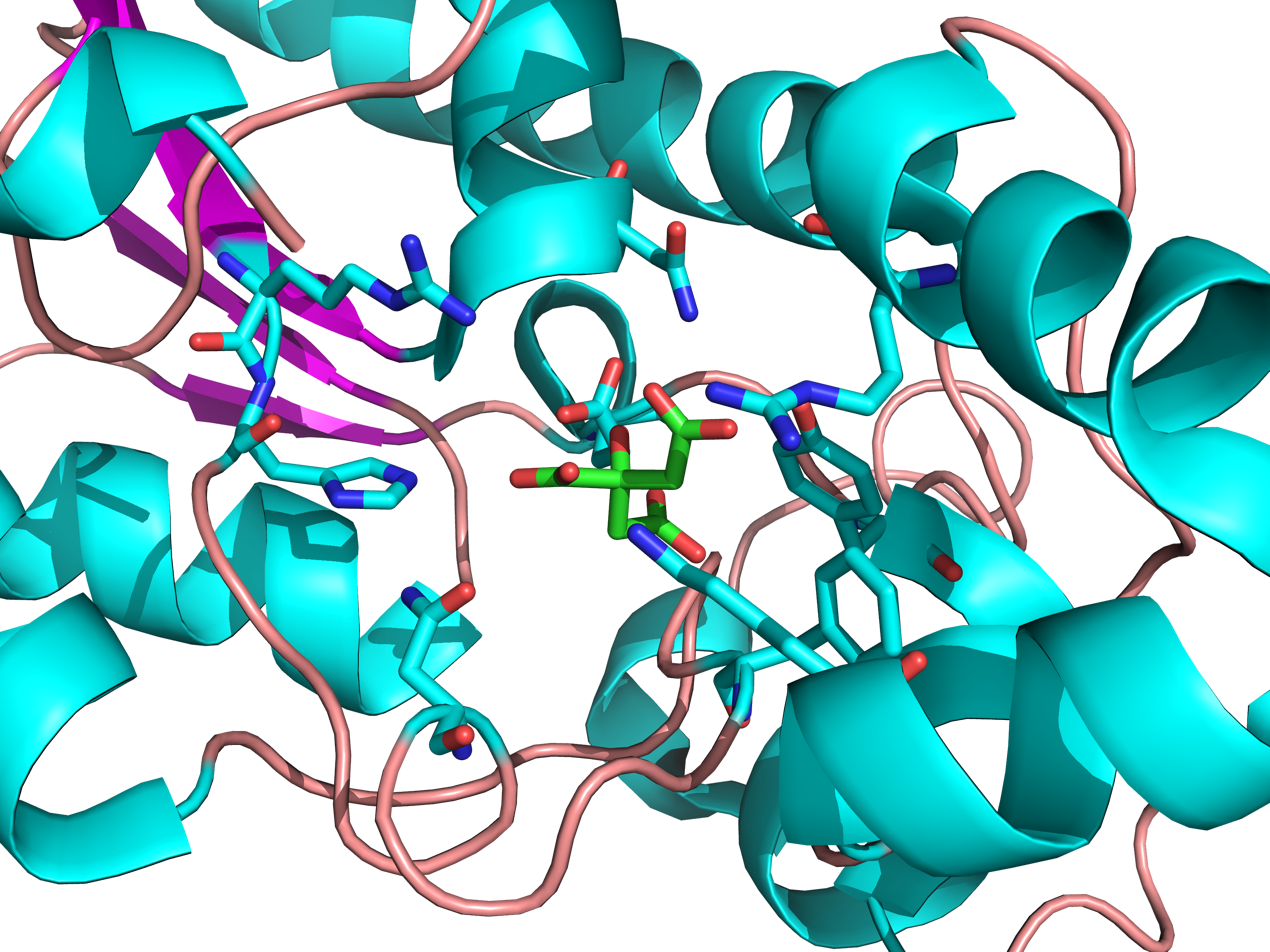
Citrate is structurally similar to the substrate 3-phosphoglycerate. The citrate molecule is shown in green. The suspected catalytically essential histidine residue involved in forming the phosphohistidine complex is directly to the left of the bound citrate molecule.

Phosphoglycerate mutase (PGM) is any enzyme that catalyzes step 8 of glycolysis – the internal transfer of a phosphate group from C-3 to C-2 which results in the conversion of 3-phosphoglycerate (3PG) to 2-phosphoglycerate (2PG) through a 2,3-bisphosphoglycerate intermediate. These enzymes are categorized into the two distinct classes of either cofactor-dependent (dPGM) or cofactor-independent (iPGM). The dPGM enzyme (EC 5.4.2.11) is composed of approximately 250 amino acids and is found in all vertebrates as well as in some invertebrates, fungi, and bacteria. The iPGM (EC 5.4.2.12) class is found in all plants and algae as well as in some invertebrate, fungi, and Gram-positive bacteria. This class of PGM enzyme shares the same superfamily as alkaline phosphatase.

== Mechanism ==
PGM is an isomerase enzyme, effectively transferring a phosphate group (PO^{3−}_{4}) from the C-3 carbon of 3-phosphoglycerate to the C-2 carbon forming 2-phosphoglycerate. There are a total of three reactions dPGM can catalyze: a mutase reaction resulting in the conversion of 3PG to 2PG and vice versa, a phosphatase reaction creating phosphoglycerate from 2,3-bisphosphoglycerate, and a synthase reaction producing 2,3-bisphosphoglycerate from 1,3-bisphosphoglycerate similar to the enzyme bisphosphoglycerate mutase. Kinetic and structural studies have provided evidence that indicate dPGM and bisphosphoglycerate mutase are paralogous structures. Both enzymes are contained in the superfamily that also contains the phosphatase portion of phosphofructokinase 2 and prostatic acid phosphatase.

The catalyzed mutase reaction involves two separate phosphoryl groups and the ending phosphate on the 2-carbon is not the same phosphate removed from the 3-carbon.
In the cofactor-dependent enzyme's initial state, the active site contains a phosphohistidine complex formed by phosphorylation of a specific histidine residue. When 3-phosphoglycerate enters the active site, the phosphohistidine complex is positioned as to facilitate transfer of phosphate from enzyme to substrate C-2 creating a 2,3-bisphosphoglycerate intermediate.
Dephosphorylation of the enzyme histidine actuates a local allosteric change in enzyme configuration which now aligns the substrates 3-C phosphate group with enzyme active site histidine and facilitates phosphate transfer returning the enzyme to its initial phosphorylated state and releasing product 2-phosphoglycerate. 2,3-Bisphosphoglycerate is required a cofactor for dPGM. In contrast, the iPGM class is independent of 2,3-bisphosphoglycerate and catalyzes the intramolecular transfer of the phosphate group on monophosphoglycerates using a phosphoserineintermediate.

=== Reaction summary ===
3PG + P-Enzyme → 2,3BPG + Enzyme → 2PG + P-Enzyme

   3-phosphoglycerate         intermediate          2-phosphoglycerate

ΔG°′=+1.1 kcal/mol

3PG

2,3BPG

2PG

== Isozymes ==
phosphoglycerate mutase 1 (brain)
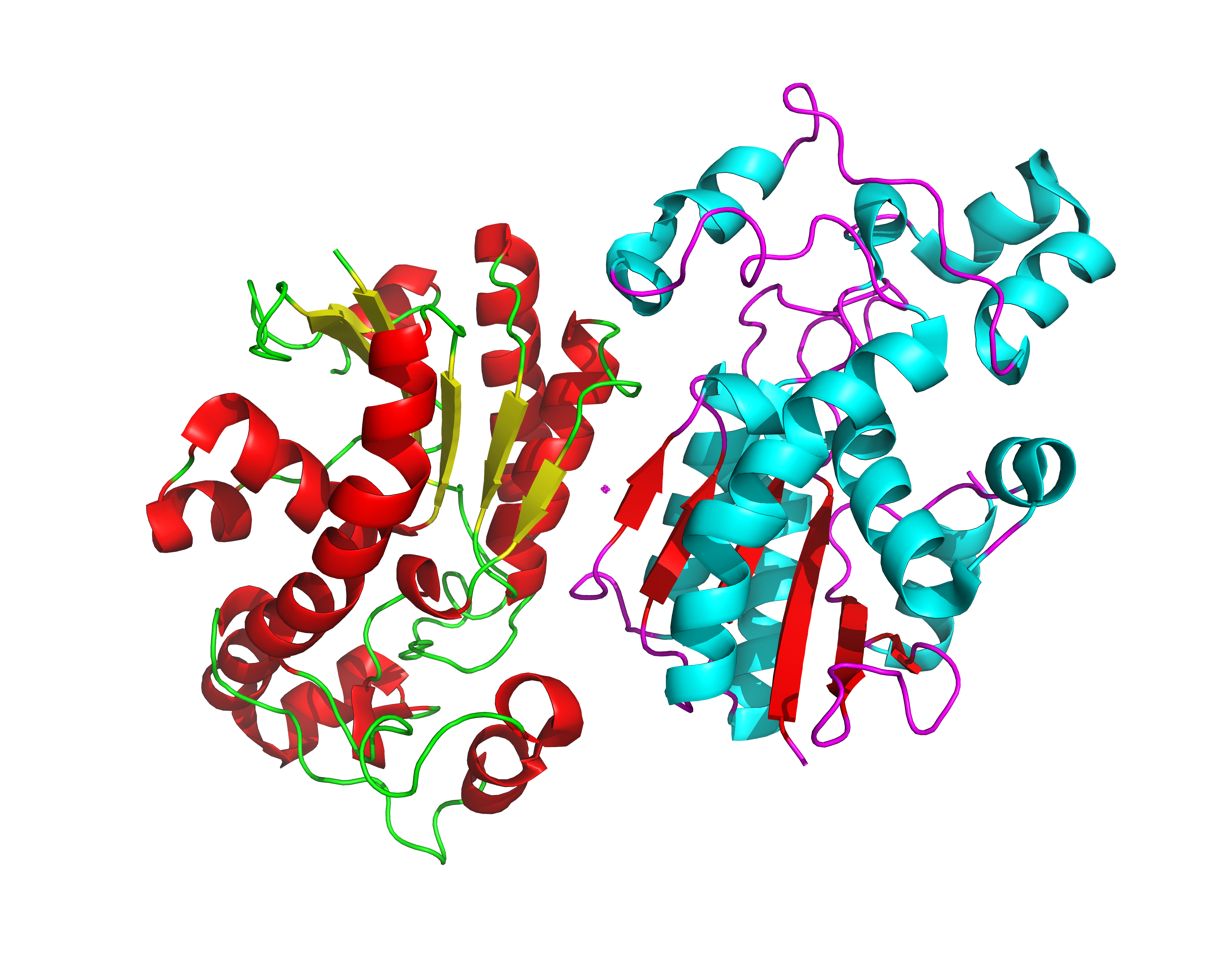

Identifiers
- Symbol: PGAM1
- Alt. symbols: PGAMA
- NCBI gene: 5223
- HGNC: 8888
- OMIM: 172250
- RefSeq: NM_002629
- UniProt: P18669

Other data
- EC number: 5.4.2.11
- Locus: Chr. 10 q25.3
Search for
- Structures: Swiss-model
- Domains: InterPro

phosphoglycerate mutase 2 (muscle)

Identifiers
- Symbol: PGAM2
- NCBI gene: 5224
- HGNC: 8889
- OMIM: 261670
- RefSeq: NM_000290
- UniProt: P15259

Other data
- EC number: 5.4.2.11
- Locus: Chr. 7 p13-p12
Search for
- Structures: Swiss-model
- Domains: InterPro

Phosphoglycerate mutase exists primarily as a dimer of two either identical or closely related subunits of about 32 kDa. The enzyme is found in organisms as simple as yeast through Homo sapiens and its structure is highly conserved throughout. (Yeast PGM≈74% conserved vs mammal form).

In mammals, the enzyme subunits appear to be either a muscle-derived form (m-type) or other tissue (b-type, for brain where the b-isozyme was originally isolated). Existing as a dimer, the enzyme then has three isozymes depending on which subunit forms makeup the whole molecule (mm, bb or mb). The mm-type is found mainly in smooth muscle almost exclusively. The mb-isozyme is found in cardiac and skeletal muscle and the bb-type is found in the rest of tissues. While all three isozymes may be found in any tissue, the above distributions are based on prevalence in each.

== Interactive pathway map ==
Click on genes, proteins and metabolites below to link to respective articles. (Note: The interactive pathway map can be edited at WikiPathways: "GlycolysisGluconeogenesis_WP534".)

Glycolysis and Gluconeogenesis edit

== Regulation ==
Phosphoglycerate mutase has a small positive Gibbs free energy and this reaction proceeds easily in both directions. Since it is a reversible reaction, it is not the site of major regulation mechanisms or regulation schemes for the glycolytic pathway.

Anionic molecules such as vanadate, acetate, chloride ion, phosphate, 2-phosphoglycolate, and N-[tris(hydroxymethyl)methyl-2-amino]ethanesulfonate are known inhibitors of the mutase activity of dPGM. Studies have shown dPGM to be sensitive to changes in ionic concentration, where increasing concentrations of salts result in the activation of the enzyme's phosphatase activity while inhibiting its mutase activity. Certain salts, such as KCl, are known to be competitive inhibitors in respect to 2-phosphoglycerate and mutase activity. Both phosphate and 2-phosphoglycolate are competitive inhibitors of mutase activity in respect to the substrates 2-phosphoglycerate and 2,3-bisphosphoglycerate.

== Clinical significance ==
In humans the PGAM2 gene which encodes this enzyme is located on the short arm of chromosome 7.

Deficiency of phosphoglycerate mutase causes glycogen storage disease type X, a rare autosomal recessive genetic disorder with symptoms ranging from mild to moderate; is not thought life-threatening and can be managed with changes in lifestyle. This presents as a metabolic myopathy and is one of the many forms of syndromes formerly referred to as muscular dystrophy. PGAM1 deficiency affects the liver, while PGAM2 deficiency affects the muscle.

Onset is generally noted as childhood to early adult though some who may be mildly affected by the disorder may not know they have it. Patients with PGAM deficiency are usually asymptomatic, except when they engage in brief, strenuous efforts which may trigger myalgias, cramps, muscle necrosis and myoglobinuria. An unusual pathologic feature of PGAM deficiency is the association with tubular aggregates. The symptoms are an intolerance to physical exertion or activity, cramps and muscle pain. Permanent weakness is rare. The disease is not progressive and has an excellent prognosis.

== Human proteins containing this domain ==
BPGM; PFKFB1; PFKFB2; PFKFB3; PFKFB4; PGAM1; PGAM2; PGAM4; PGAM5; STS1; UBASH3A;
