= Bernard Benesh =

American entomologist (1891–1964)

Bernard Benesh (17 August 1891 in Graben – 17 September 1964 in Burrville in Morgan County, Tennessee) was an American entomologist who specialised in Lucanidae.

Benesh immigrated to the United States in 1909. He first lived in Chicago where he worked in a steel mill. He served in the United States Army's 1st Cavalry Regiment, rose to the rank of Sergeant, and left after the end of World War I. Later, in poor health, he retired and moved to Burrville, in Morgan County, Tennessee. He collaborated with the Field Museum of Natural History in Chicago where his collection is preserved. Benesh published numerous papers between 1932 and 1960 and in 1960 he published Coleopterorum Catalogus Supplementa, a World catalogue of the 800 or so species.
