= Reinhold and Ruth Benesch =

US biochemists and hemoglobin specialists

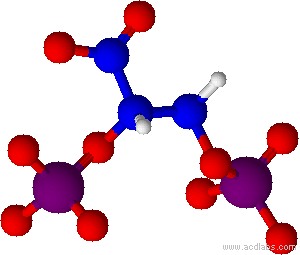
2,3-Bisphosphoglyceric acid, which the Benesches discovered played a key role in the transport of oxygen by hemoglobin

Reinhold Benesch (August 13, 1919 – December 30, 1986) and Ruth Erica Benesch (February 25, 1925–March 25, 2000) were American biochemists at Columbia University whose forty year scientific collaboration primarily investigated hemoglobin. Their most important discovery was the function of 2,3-bisphosphoglyceric acid.

Reinhold Benesch was born in Poland but immigrated to England. He graduated from Leeds University in 1941. Ruth Benesch was born in Paris, France to Helene Leroi, a German economist who returned with her to Berlin six days later. She and her sister were evacuated to England via Kindertransport in 1939, where she graduated from Stroud High School and received a B.Sc. from Birkbeck College in 1946. To support herself in college she worked at a rubber factory where she met Reinhold, who was working there as a consultant. They married in 1946.

Both Benesches earned their doctorates in biochemistry from Northwestern University, he in 1950, she in 1952. They began working at Columbia in 1960.

Their early work concerned sulfur in proteins and thiol groups. However, the bulk of their collaboration centered on hemoglobin. Of 125 scientific papers they published together, only 13 do not concern hemoglobin.

Their key discovery, in 1967, was that 2,3-bisphosphoglyceric acid was necessary for hemoglobin to transport oxygen throughout the human body through its role in loosening the bonds between hemoglobin and oxygen. This transformed how scientists viewed the oxygen transport system. Nobel laureate Max Perutz notes "that discovery opened a new era in the physiology of the respiratory carriage". The concentration of 2,3-bisphosphoglyceric acid in blood, 40 mg per 100 ml, had been known for many years, but it was not until the Benesches converted this concentration into modern units as 3.6–5.0 mM that its similarity to that of hemoglobin was noticed.

The Benesches also demonstrated that two types of protein chains, hetero-oligomer and homo-oligomer, were essential to the proper functioning of hemoglobin. Their paper in Science summarizing their discoveries was humorously titled "Homos and Heteros Among the Hemos" and signed "R^{2}B^{2}" to signify their "heterodimer." They also discovered mutant hemoglobin which only produced one type of chain, which were important in their later studies of sickle-cell anemia, caused by misshapen red blood cells.

After Reinhold's death in 1986, Ruth continued their work, until retiring in 1996. She died in 2000.
