= Kurt Benesch =

Austrian writer

Kurt Benesch (17 May 1926 – 20 January 2008) was an Austrian writer.

== Life ==
His father was a governmental counselor. He finished his primary and secondary educations in Vienna, where he had been born. Later, he made working services in Poland and the military service in Italy. After a British imprisonment, he studied at the University of Vienna, where he received a PhD in literature.

== Prizes ==
- 1993 Ernst-und-Rosa-von-Dombrowski-Stiftungspreis

== Works ==
- 1955: Die Flucht vor dem Engel. Roman
- 1956: Der Maßlose
- 1967: Nie zurück!
- 1985: Die Spur in der Wüste
- 1991: Der Jakobsweg nach Santiago de Compostela
- 1993: Die Suche nach Jägerstätter (novela biográfica)
