= Three-carbon molecule =

Class of chemical compounds

Three-carbon molecules are based on a skeleton made from three carbon atoms. They may be in a chain, or cycles. C3 hydrocarbons are usually gases, they are inflammable, and may be harmful to humans and the environment. The CAS registry number for three-carbon hydrocarbons is 68606-26-8. Hydrocarbons that include three atoms are:

- Propane C_{3}H_{8}
- Propene C_{3}H_{6}
- Cyclopropane C_{3}H_{6}
- propyne C_{3}H_{4}
- Cyclopropene C_{3}H_{4}
- Propadiene C_{3}H_{4}
- Cyclopropenylidene C_{3}H_{2}
- Cyclopropyne C_{3}H_{2}
- Tricarbon C_{3}
