= Bisphosphoglycerate phosphatase =

Enzyme

bisphosphoglycerate phosphatase
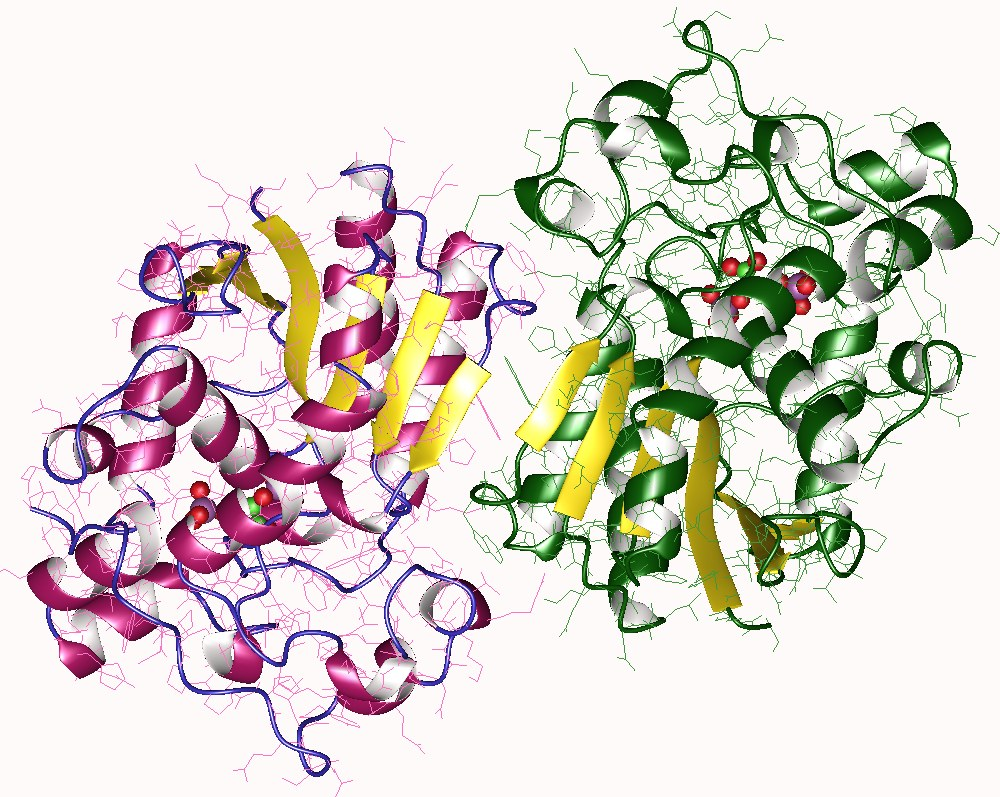
- Bisphosphoglycerate phosphatase (bifunctional) homodimer, Human

Identifiers
- EC no.: 3.1.3.13
- CAS no.: 9033-04-9

Databases
- BRENDA: enzyme data
- ExPASy: NiceZyme view
- KEGG: enzyme entry
- MetaCyc: metabolic pathway
- Rhea: reactions
- PDB structures: RCSB PDB PDBe PDBsum
- Gene Ontology: AmiGO / QuickGO
Search
- PMC: articles
- PubMed: articles
- NCBI: proteins

In enzymology, a bisphosphoglycerate phosphatase (EC 3.1.3.13) is an enzyme that catalyzes the chemical reaction

2,3-bisphospho-D-glycerate + H_{2}O $\rightleftharpoons$ 3-phospho-D-glycerate + phosphate

Thus, the two substrates of this enzyme are 2,3-bisphospho-D-glycerate and H_{2}O, whereas its two products are 3-phospho-D-glycerate and phosphate.

This enzyme belongs to the family of hydrolases, specifically those acting on phosphoric monoester bonds. The systematic name of this enzyme class is 2,3-bisphospho-D-glycerate 2-phosphohydrolase. Other names in common use include 2,3-diphosphoglycerate phosphatase, diphosphoglycerate phosphatase, 2,3-diphosphoglyceric acid phosphatase, 2,3-bisphosphoglycerate phosphatase, and glycerate-2,3-diphosphate phosphatase. This enzyme participates in glycolysis/gluconeogenesis.

== Structural studies ==
As of late 2007, 7 structures have been solved for this class of enzymes, with PDB accession codes PDB: 1YFK, PDB: 1YJX, PDB: 2F90, PDB: 2H4X, PDB: 2H4Z, PDB: 2H52, and PDB: 2HHJ.
