= Phosphoglycerate kinase =

Enzyme

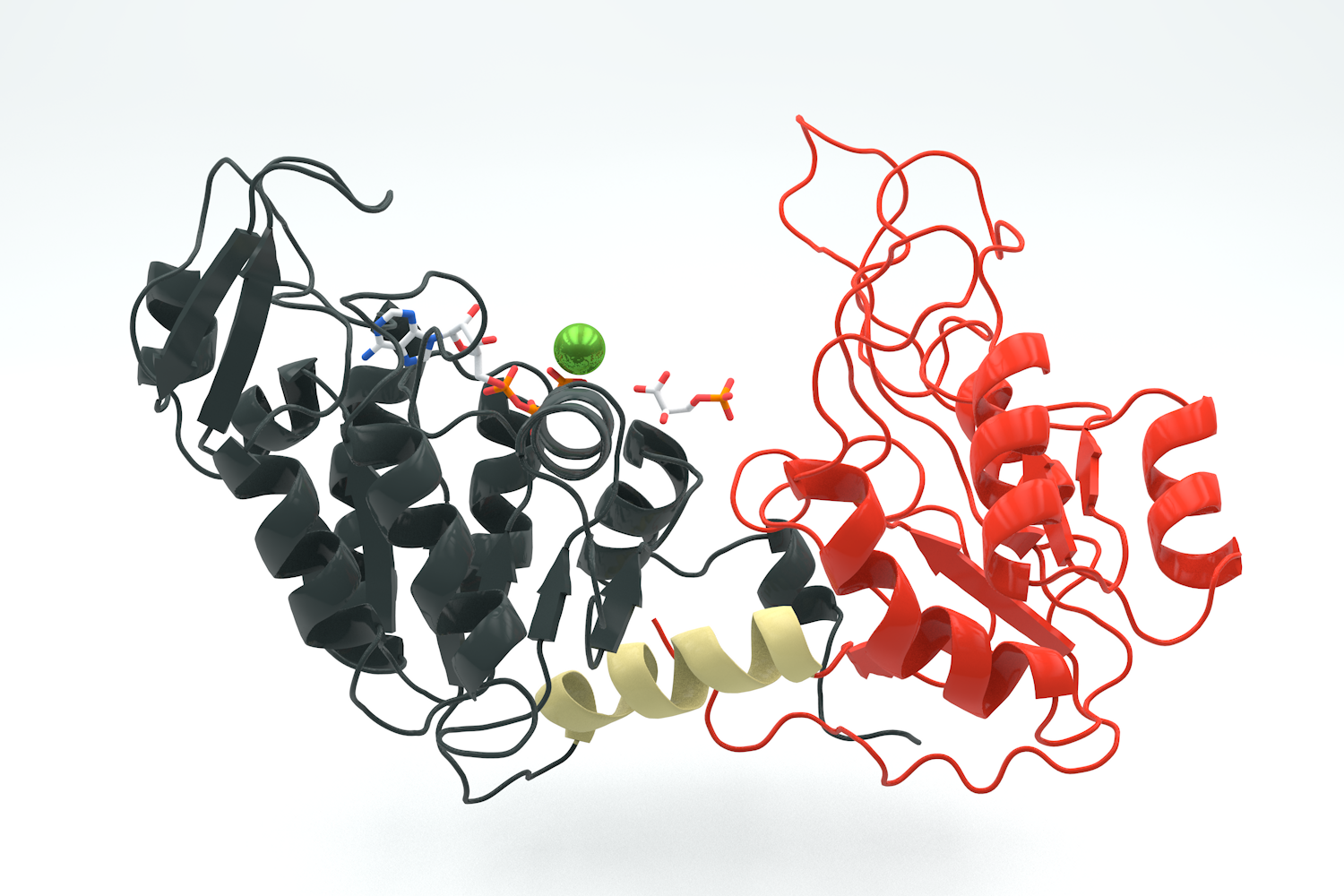

Identifiers
- EC no.: 2.7.2.3
- CAS no.: 9001-83-6

Databases
- BRENDA: enzyme data
- ExPASy: NiceZyme view
- KEGG: enzyme entry
- MetaCyc: metabolic pathway
- Rhea: reactions
- PDB structures: RCSB PDB PDBe PDBsum
- Gene Ontology: AmiGO / QuickGO
Search
- PMC: articles
- PubMed: articles
- NCBI: proteins

Phosphoglycerate kinase
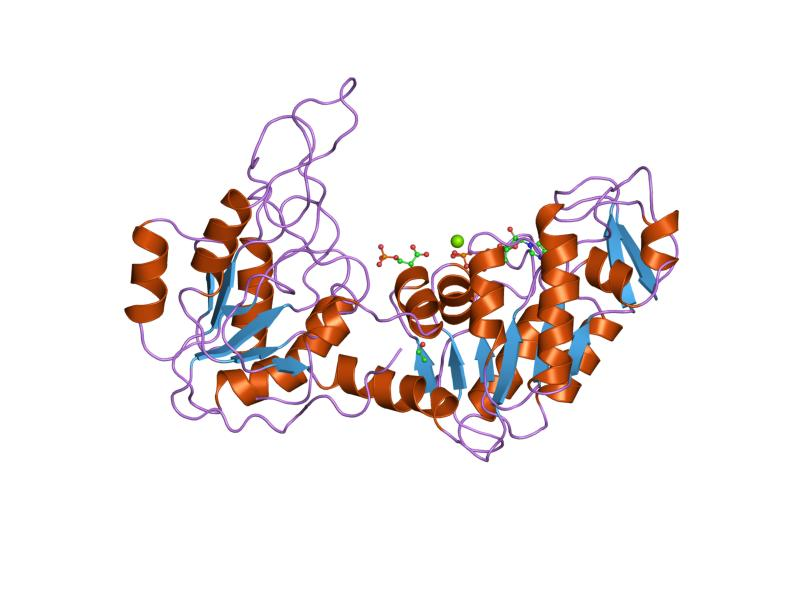
- Structure of yeast phosphoglycerate kinase.

Identifiers
- Symbol: PGK
- Pfam: PF00162
- InterPro: IPR001576
- PROSITE: PDOC00102
- SCOP2: 3pgk / SCOPe / SUPFAM
Available protein structures:
- PDB: IPR001576 PF00162 (ECOD; PDBsum)
- AlphaFold: IPR001576; PF00162

Phosphoglycerate kinase (EC 2.7.2.3) (PGK 1) is an enzyme that catalyzes the reversible transfer of a phosphate group from 1,3-bisphosphoglyceric acid (1,3-BPG) to adenosine diphosphate (ADP) producing 3-phosphoglyceric acid (3-PG) and adenosine triphosphate (ATP):

1,3-bisphospho-D-glyceric acid
ADP
ATP
ADP
ATP
3-phosphoglyceric acid

Like all kinases it is a transferase. PGK is a major enzyme used in glycolysis, in the first ATP-generating step of the glycolytic pathway. In gluconeogenesis, the reaction catalyzed by PGK proceeds in the opposite direction, generating ADP and 1,3-BPG.

In humans, two isozymes of PGK have been so far identified, PGK1 and PGK2. The isozymes have 87-88% identical amino acid sequence identity and though they are structurally and functionally similar, they have different localizations: PGK2, encoded by an autosomal gene, is unique to meiotic and postmeiotic spermatogenic cells, while PGK1, encoded on the X-chromosome, is ubiquitously expressed in all cells.

== Biological function ==
PGK is present in all living organisms as one of the two ATP-generating enzymes in glycolysis. In the gluconeogenic pathway, PGK catalyzes the reverse reaction. Under biochemical standard conditions, the glycolytic direction is favored.

In the Calvin cycle in photosynthetic organisms, PGK catalyzes the phosphorylation of 3-PG, producing 1,3-BPG and ADP, as part of the reactions that regenerate ribulose-1,5-bisphosphate.

PGK has been reported to exhibit thiol reductase activity on plasmin, leading to angiostatin formation, which inhibits angiogenesis and tumor growth. The enzyme was also shown to participate in DNA replication and repair in mammal cell nuclei.

The human isozyme PGK2, which is only expressed during spermatogenesis, was shown to be essential for sperm function in mice.

=== Interactive pathway map ===
Click on genes, proteins and metabolites below to link to respective articles. (Note: The interactive pathway map can be edited at WikiPathways: "GlycolysisGluconeogenesis_WP534".)

Glycolysis and Gluconeogenesis edit

== Structure ==
=== Overview ===
PGK is found in all living organisms and its sequence has been highly conserved throughout evolution. The enzyme exists as a 415-residue monomer containing two nearly equal-sized domains that correspond to the N- and C-termini of the protein. 3-phosphoglycerate (3-PG) binds to the N-terminal, while the nucleotide substrates, MgATP or MgADP, bind to the C-terminal domain of the enzyme. This extended two-domain structure is associated with large-scale 'hinge-bending' conformational changes, similar to those found in hexokinase. The two domains of the protein are separated by a cleft and linked by two alpha-helices. At the core of each domain is a 6-stranded parallel beta-sheet surrounded by alpha helices. The two lobes are capable of folding independently, consistent with the presence of intermediates on the folding pathway with a single domain folded. Though the binding of either substrate triggers a conformational change, only through the binding of both substrates does domain closure occur, leading to the transfer of the phosphate group.

The enzyme has a tendency to exist in the open conformation with short periods of closure and catalysis, which allow for rapid diffusion of substrate and products through the binding sites; the open conformation of PGK is more conformationally stable due to the exposure of a hydrophobic region of the protein upon domain closure.

=== Role of magnesium ===
Magnesium ions are normally complexed to the phosphate groups the nucleotide substrates of PGK. It is known that in the absence of magnesium, no enzyme activity occurs. The bivalent metal assists the enzyme ligands in shielding the bound phosphate group's negative charges, allowing the nucleophilic attack to occur; this charge-stabilization is a typical characteristic of phosphotransfer reaction. It is theorized that the ion may also encourage domain closure when PGK has bound both substrates.

== Mechanism ==
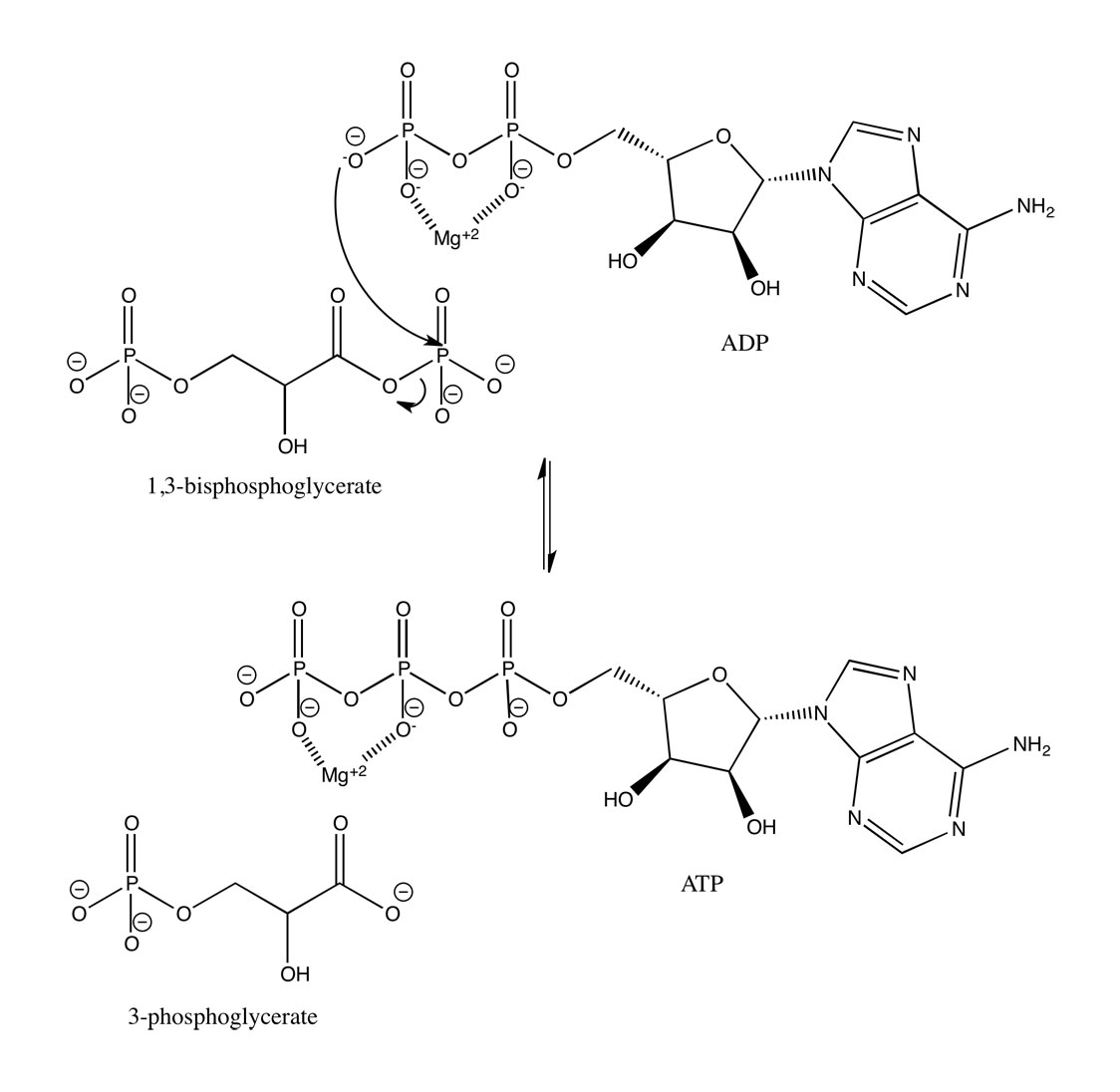
Phosphoglycerate kinase mechanism in glycolysis.

Without either substrate bound, PGK exists in an "open" conformation. After both the triose and nucleotide substrates are bound to the N- and C-terminal domains, respectively, an extensive hinge-bending motion occurs, bringing the domains and their bound substrates into close proximity and leading to a "closed" conformation. Then, in the case of the forward glycolytic reaction, the beta-phosphate of ADP initiates a nucleophilic attack on the 1-phosphate of 1,3-BPG. The Lys219 on the enzyme guides the phosphate group to the substrate.

PGK proceeds through a charge-stabilized transition state that is favored over the arrangement of the bound substrate in the closed enzyme because in the transition state, all three phosphate oxygens are stabilized by ligands, as opposed to only two stabilized oxygens in the initial bound state.

In the glycolytic pathway, 1,3-BPG is the phosphate donor and has a high phosphoryl-transfer potential. The PGK-catalyzed transfer of the phosphate group from 1,3-BPG to ADP to yield ATP can power the carbon-oxidation reaction of the previous glycolytic step (converting glyceraldehyde 3-phosphate to 3-phosphoglycerate).

== Regulation ==
The enzyme is activated by low concentrations of various multivalent anions, such as pyrophosphate, sulfate, phosphate, and citrate. High concentrations of MgATP and 3-PG activates PGK, while Mg2+ at high concentrations non-competitively inhibits the enzyme.

PGK exhibits a wide specificity toward nucleotide substrates. Its activity is inhibited by salicylates, which appear to mimic the enzyme's nucleotide substrate.

Macromolecular crowding has been shown to increase PGK activity in both computer simulations and in vitro environments simulating a cell interior; as a result of crowding, the enzyme becomes more enzymatically active and more compact.

== Disease relevance ==
Phosphoglycerate kinase (PGK) deficiency is an X-linked recessive trait associated with hemolytic anemia, mental disorders and myopathy in humans, depending on form – there exists a hemolytic form and a myopathic form. Since the trait is X-linked, it is usually fully expressed in males, who have one X chromosome; affected females are typically asymptomatic. The condition results from mutations in Pgk1, the gene encoding PGK1, and twenty mutations have been identified. On a molecular level, the mutation in Pgk1 impairs the thermal stability and inhibits the catalytic activity of the enzyme. PGK is the only enzyme in the immediate glycolytic pathway encoded by an X-linked gene. In the case of hemolytic anemia, PGK deficiency occurs in the erythrocytes. Currently, no definitive treatment exists for PGK deficiency.

PGK1 overexpression has been associated with gastric cancer and has been found to increase the invasiveness of gastric cancer cells in vitro. The enzyme is secreted by tumor cells and participates in the angiogenic process, leading to the release of angiostatin and the inhibition of tumor blood vessel growth.

Due to its wide specificity towards nucleotide substrates, PGK is known to participate in the phosphorylation and activation of HIV antiretroviral drugs, which are nucleotide-based.

== Human isozymes ==
phosphoglycerate kinase 1

Identifiers
- Symbol: PGK1
- NCBI gene: 5230
- HGNC: 8896
- OMIM: 311800
- RefSeq: NM_000291
- UniProt: P00558

Other data
- EC number: 2.7.2.3
- Locus: Chr. X q13.3
Search for
- Structures: Swiss-model
- Domains: InterPro

phosphoglycerate kinase 2

Identifiers
- Symbol: PGK2
- NCBI gene: 5232
- HGNC: 8898
- OMIM: 172270
- RefSeq: NM_138733
- UniProt: P07205

Other data
- EC number: 2.7.2.3
- Locus: Chr. 6 p21-q12
Search for
- Structures: Swiss-model
- Domains: InterPro
