= 2,3-Bisphosphoglyceric acid =

Names
- Preferred IUPAC name 2,3-Bis(phosphonooxy)propanoic acid
- Other names 2,3-Diphosphoglyceric acid; 2,3-Diphosphoglycerate; 2,3-Bisphosphoglycerate

Identifiers
CAS Number	138-81-8
3D model (JSmol)	Interactive image
Abbreviations	2,3-BPG; 2,3-DPG; 23BPG
ChEBI	CHEBI:17720
ChemSpider	161681; 60 (Racemic)
KEGG	C01159
PubChem CID	61
UNII	TZ4454O4YZ
CompTox Dashboard (EPA)	DTXSID10861801
- InChI: InChI=1S/C3H8O10P2/c4-3(5)2(13-15(9,10)11)1-12-14(6,7)8/h2H,1H2,(H,4,5)(H2,6,7,8)(H2,9,10,11)/t2-/m1/s1 Key: XOHUEYCVLUUEJJ-UWTATZPHSA-N; Key: XOHUEYCVLUUEJJ-UWTATZPHBL
- SMILES: O=P(O)(OC(C(=O)O)COP(=O)(O)O)O

Properties
Chemical formula	C_{3}H_{8}O_{10}P_{2}
Molar mass	266.035 g·mol^{−1}
- Except where otherwise noted, data are given for materials in their standard state (at 25 °C [77 °F], 100 kPa). verify (what is ?) Infobox references

2,3-Bisphosphoglyceric acid (conjugate base 2,3-bisphosphoglycerate) (2,3-BPG), also known as 2,3-diphosphoglyceric acid (conjugate base 2,3-diphosphoglycerate) (2,3-DPG), is a three-carbon isomer of the glycolytic intermediate 1,3-bisphosphoglyceric acid (1,3-BPG).

D-2,3-BPG is present in human red blood cells (RBC; erythrocyte) at approximately 5 mmol/L. It binds with greater affinity to deoxygenated hemoglobin (e.g., when the red blood cell is near respiring tissue) than it does to oxygenated hemoglobin (e.g., in the lungs) due to conformational differences: 2,3-BPG (with an estimated size of about 9 Å) fits in the deoxygenated hemoglobin conformation (with an 11-Angstrom pocket), but not as well in the oxygenated conformation (5 Angstroms). It interacts with deoxygenated hemoglobin beta subunits and decreases the affinity for oxygen and allosterically promotes the release of the remaining oxygen molecules bound to the hemoglobin. Therefore, it enhances the ability of RBCs to release oxygen near tissues that need it most. 2,3-BPG is thus an allosteric effector.

Its function was discovered in 1967 by Reinhold Benesch and Ruth Benesch.

== Metabolism ==
2,3-BPG is formed from 1,3-BPG by the enzyme BPG mutase. It can then be broken down by 2,3-BPG phosphatase to form 3-phosphoglycerate. Its synthesis and breakdown are, therefore, a way around a step of glycolysis, with the net expense of one ATP per molecule of 2,3-BPG generated as the high-energy carboxylic acid-phosphate mixed anhydride bond is cleaved by 2,3-BPG phosphatase.

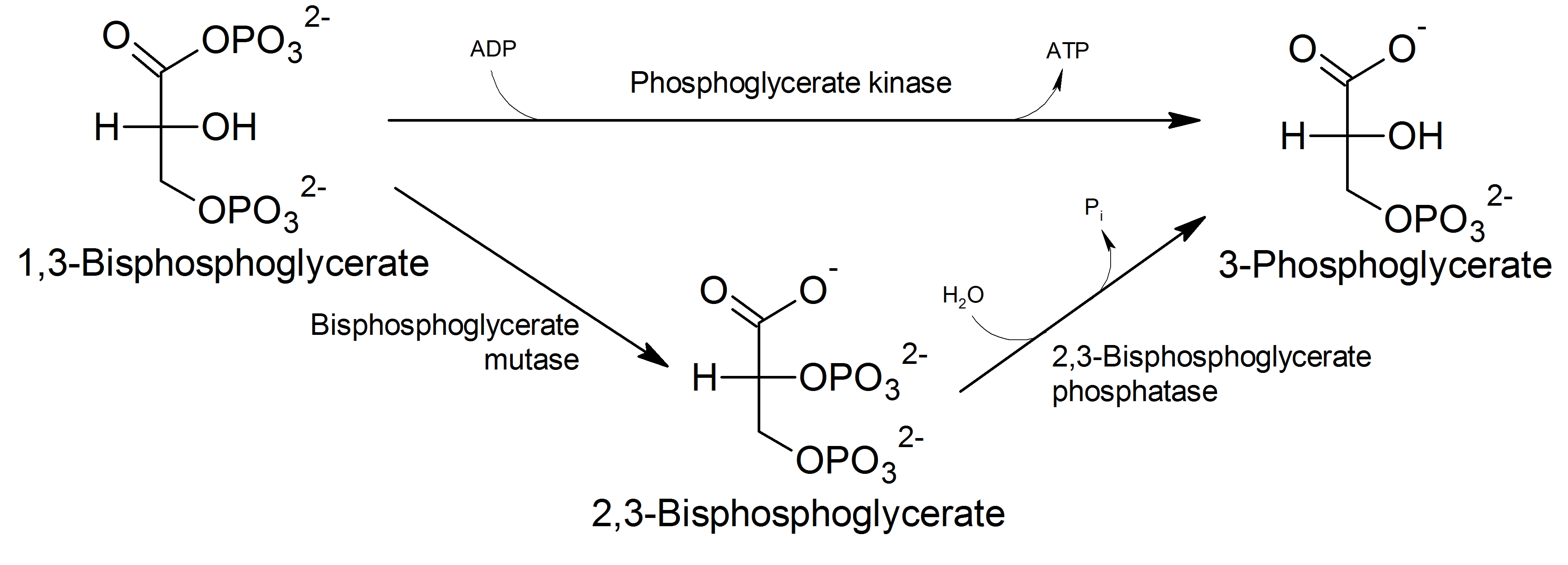

The normal glycolytic pathway generates 1,3-BPG, which may be dephosphorylated by phosphoglycerate kinase (PGK), generating ATP, or it may be shunted into the Luebering-Rapoport pathway, where bisphosphoglycerate mutase catalyzes the transfer of a phosphoryl group from C1 to C2 of 1,3-BPG, giving 2,3-BPG. 2,3-BPG, the most concentrated organophosphate in the erythrocyte, forms 3-PG by the action of bisphosphoglycerate phosphatase. The concentration of 2,3-BPG varies proportionately to the [H+].

There is a delicate balance between the need to generate ATP to support energy requirements for cell metabolism and the need to maintain appropriate oxygenation/deoxygenation status of hemoglobin. This balance is maintained by isomerisation of 1,3-BPG to 2,3-BPG, which enhances the deoxygenation of hemoglobin.

== Structural binding to hemoglobin ==
When 2,3-BPG binds to deoxyhemoglobin, it acts to stabilize the low oxygen affinity state (T state) of the oxygen carrier. It fits neatly into the cavity of the deoxy- conformation, exploiting the molecular symmetry and positive polarity by forming salt bridges with lysine and histidine residues in the β subunits of hemoglobin. The R state, with oxygen bound to a heme group, has a different conformation and does not allow this interaction. By itself, hemoglobin has sigmoid-like kinetics. In selectively binding to deoxyhemoglobin, 2,3-BPG stabilizes the T state conformation, making it harder for oxygen to bind hemoglobin and more likely to be released to adjacent tissues.

== Physiological effects ==
An increase in 2,3-BPG essentially facilitates the delivery of oxygen from hemoglobin in target tissues, at a cost of also making it somewhat more difficult for hemoglobin to take up oxygen in the lungs. This mechanism makes maternal-fetal oxygenation more efficient, as fetal 2,3-BPG is lower than maternal levels, resulting in a higher uptake of oxygen by the fetal blood in the placenta.

=== High altitude acclimatisation ===
Oxygen-haemoglobin dissociation curve

2,3-BPG may also serve to physiologically counteract certain metabolic disturbances to the oxygen-hemoglobin dissociation curve. For example, at high altitudes, low atmospheric oxygen content can cause hyperventilation and resultant respiratory alkalosis which causes an abnormal left-shift of the oxygen-hemoglobin dissociation curve, and this can be counteracted by an increase in 2,3-BPG. Traditional teaching has claimed that the physiologic increased 2,3-BPG seen at high altitudes is simply to make it easier for oxygen to be delivered in target tissues, but this mechanism by itself is refuted by the reasoning that the decreased oxygen affinity would also inhibit oxygen uptake in the lungs, and arguably result in a net decrease in total oxygen delivery to target tissues.

=== Maternal-fetal oxygenation ===
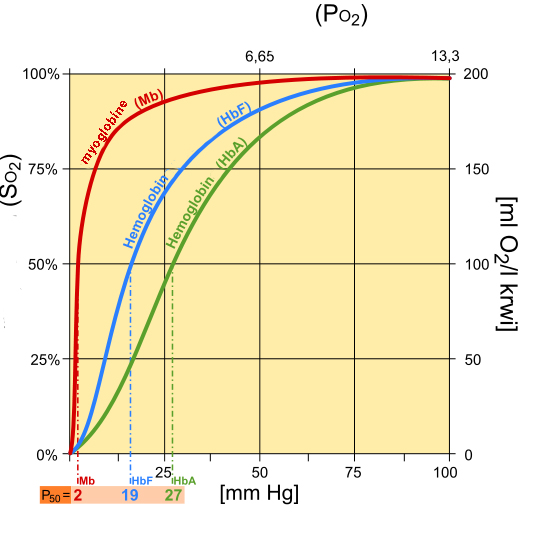
Differences between myoglobin (Mb), fetal hemoglobin (Hb F), adult hemoglobin (Hb A)

In pregnant women, there is a 30% increase in intracellular 2,3-BPG. This lowers the maternal hemoglobin affinity for oxygen, and therefore allows more oxygen to be offloaded to the fetus in the maternal uterine arteries. The fetus has a low sensitivity to 2,3-BPG, so its hemoglobin has a higher affinity for oxygen. Therefore, although the pO2 in the uterine arteries is low, the fetal umbilical artery (which carries deoxygenated blood) can still get oxygenated from them.

The increased maternal 2,3-BPG also causes a decreased affinity for oxygen takeup in the lungs, but this is usually compensated by a physiologic increased respiratory rate in pregnancy.

Fetal hemoglobin (HbF), on the other hand, exhibits a low affinity for 2,3-BPG, resulting in a higher binding affinity for oxygen. This increased oxygen-binding affinity relative to that of adult hemoglobin (HbA) is due to HbF's having two α/γ dimers as opposed to the two α/β dimers of HbA. The positive histidine residues of HbA β-subunits that are essential for forming the 2,3-BPG binding pocket are replaced by serine residues in HbF γ-subunits. Like that, histidine nº143 gets lost, so 2,3-BPG has difficulties in linking to the fetal hemoglobin, and it looks like the pure hemoglobin. Increased binding affinity of fetal hemoglobin relative to HbA facilitates the passage of oxygen across the placental membrane from the mother to the fetus.

== Clinical significance ==
Hyperthyroidism

A 2004 study checked the effects of thyroid hormone on 2,3-BPG levels. The result was that the hyperthyroidism modulates in vivo 2,3-BPG content in erythrocytes by changes in the expression of phosphoglycerate mutase (PGM) and 2,3-BPG synthase. This result shows that the increase in the 2,3-BPG content of erythrocytes observed in hyperthyroidism doesn’t depend on any variation in the rate of circulating hemoglobin, but seems to be a direct consequence of the stimulating effect of thyroid hormones on erythrocyte glycolytic activity.

Chronic anemia

Red cells increase their intracellular 2,3-BPG concentration as much as five times within one to two hours in patients with chronic anemia, when the oxygen carrying capacity of the blood is diminished. This results in a rightward shift of the oxygen dissociation curve and more oxygen being released to the tissues.

Chronic respiratory disease with hypoxia

Increased 2,3-BPG levels have been noted in individuals with chronic hypoxia, and chronic lung disease.

An association between low amounts of 2,3-BPG and the occurrence of high altitude pulmonary edema at high altitudes has been observed.

CONCENTRATION OF 2,3-BPG ERYTHROCYTE FOUND IN DIFFERENT CLINICAL SITUATIONS STUDIED
		n	Hb (g/dl)	2,3-BPG (mM)
1	Normality	120	14.2 ± 1.6	4.54 ± 0.57
2	Hyperthyroidism	35	13.7 ± 1.4	5.66 ± 0.69
3	Iron deficiency anaemia	40	10.0 ± 1.7	5.79 ± 1.02
4	Chronic respiratory disease with hypoxia	47	16.4 ± 2.2	5.29 ± 1.13

Hemodialysis

In a 1998 study, erythrocyte 2,3-BPG concentration was analyzed during the hemodialysis process. The 2,3-BPG concentration was expressed relative to the hemoglobin tetramer (Hb4) concentration as the 2,3-BPG/Hb4 ratio. Physiologically, an increase in 2,3-BPG levels would be expected to counteract the hypoxia that is frequently observed in this process. Nevertheless, the results show a 2,3-BPG/Hb4 ratio decreased. This is due to the procedure itself: mechanical stress on the erythrocytes is believed to cause the 2,3-BPG escape, which is then removed by hemodialysis. The concentrations of calcium, phosphate, creatinine, urea and albumin did not correlate significantly with the total change in 2,3-BPG/Hb4 ratio. However, the ratio sampled just before dialysis correlated significantly and positively with the total weekly dosage of erythropoietin (main hormone in erythrocyte formation) given to the patients.

Transfusible blood

Storage of transfusible blood in a blood bank reduces 2,3-BPG.

== See also ==
- Oxygen–hemoglobin dissociation curve
