= Glyceraldehyde 3-phosphate =

Names
- IUPAC name 2-hydroxy-3-oxopropyl dihydrogen phosphate

Identifiers
CAS Number	591-59-3
3D model (JSmol)	Interactive image
Beilstein Reference	1725008
ChEBI	CHEBI:17138
ChEMBL	ChEMBL1232918
ChemSpider	709 (Racemic); 393755 (L isomer); 388314 (D isomer)
DrugBank	DB02263
ECHA InfoCard	100.008.839
EC Number	209-721-7
KEGG	C00661; C00118
MeSH	Glyceraldehyde+3-Phosphate
PubChem CID	729
UNII	7466PL1110
CompTox Dashboard (EPA)	DTXSID40861814
- InChI: InChI=1S/C3H7O6P/c4-1-3(5)2-9-10(6,7)8/h1,3,5H,2H2,(H2,6,7,8) Key: LXJXRIRHZLFYRP-UHFFFAOYSA-N; InChI=1/C3H7O6P/c4-1-3(5)2-9-10(6,7)8/h1,3,5H,2H2,(H2,6,7,8) Key: LXJXRIRHZLFYRP-UHFFFAOYAH
- SMILES: C([C@H](C=O)O)OP(=O)(O)O

Properties
Chemical formula	C_{3}H_{7}O_{6}P
Molar mass	170.058
Melting point	102–104 °C
- Except where otherwise noted, data are given for materials in their standard state (at 25 °C [77 °F], 100 kPa). verify (what is ?) Infobox references

Glyceraldehyde 3-phosphate, also known as triose phosphate or 3-phosphoglyceraldehyde and abbreviated as G3P, GA3P, GADP, GAP, TP, GALP or PGAL, is a metabolite that occurs as an intermediate in several central pathways of all organisms. With the chemical formula H(O)CCH(OH)CH_{2}OPO_{3}^{^{2-}}, this anion is a monophosphate ester of glyceraldehyde.

== An intermediate in both glycolysis and gluconeogenesis ==
=== Formation ===
D-glyceraldehyde 3-phosphate is formed from the following three compounds in reversible reactions:

- Fructose-1,6-bisphosphate (F1,6BP), catalyzed by aldolase.

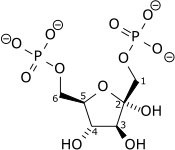
β-D-fructose 1,6-bisphosphate	fructose-bisphosphate aldolase	D-glyceraldehyde 3-phosphate		dihydroxyacetone phosphate
			+
	fructose-bisphosphate aldolase

Compound C05378 at KEGG Pathway Database. Enzyme 4.1.2.13 at KEGG Pathway Database. Compound C00111 at KEGG Pathway Database. Compound C00118 at KEGG Pathway Database.

The numbering of the carbon atoms indicates the fate of the carbons according to their position in fructose 6-phosphate.

- Dihydroxyacetone phosphate (DHAP), catalyzed by triose phosphate isomerase.

Dihydroxyacetone phosphate	triose phosphate isomerase	D-glyceraldehyde 3-phosphate
	triose phosphate isomerase

Compound C00111 at KEGG Pathway Database.Enzyme 5.3.1.1 at KEGG Pathway Database.Compound C00118 at KEGG Pathway Database.

- 1,3-bisphosphoglycerate (1,3BPG), catalyzed by glyceraldehyde 3-phosphate dehydrogenase.

=== As a substrate ===
- To produce 1,3-bisphospho-D-glycerate in glycolysis.

glyceraldehyde 3-phosphate	glyceraldehyde phosphate dehydrogenase		D-glycerate 1,3-bisphosphate
	NAD^{+} + P_{i}	NADH + H^{+}
	NAD^{+} + P_{i}	NADH + H^{+}

Compound C00118 at KEGG Pathway Database. Enzyme 1.2.1.12 at KEGG Pathway Database. Reaction R01063 at KEGG Pathway Database. Compound C00236 at KEGG Pathway Database.

D-glyceraldehyde 3-phosphate is also of some importance since this is how glycerol (as DHAP) enters the glycolytic and gluconeogenic pathways. Furthermore, it is a participant in and a product of the pentose phosphate pathway.

=== Interactive pathway map ===
|Click on genes, proteins and metabolites below to link to respective articles. (Note: The interactive pathway map can be edited at WikiPathways: "GlycolysisGluconeogenesis_WP534".)

Glycolysis and Gluconeogenesis edit

== An intermediate in photosynthesis ==
During plant photosynthesis, 2 equivalents of glycerate 3-phosphate (GP; also known as 3-phosphoglycerate) are produced by the first step of the light-independent reactions when ribulose 1,5-bisphosphate (RuBP) and carbon dioxide are catalysed by the rubisco enzyme. The GP is converted to D-glyceraldehyde 3-phosphate (G3P) using the energy in ATP and the reducing power of NADPH as part of the Calvin cycle. This returns ADP, phosphate ions Pi, and NADP+ to the light-dependent reactions of photosynthesis for their continued function. RuBP is regenerated for the Calvin cycle to continue.

G3P is generally considered the prime end-product of photosynthesis and it can be used as an immediate food nutrient, combined and rearranged to form monosaccharide sugars, such as glucose, which can be transported to other cells, or packaged for storage as insoluble polysaccharides such as starch.

=== Balance sheet ===
6 CO_{2} + 6 RuBP (+ energy from 12 ATP and 12 NADPH) →12 G3P (3-carbon)

10 G3P (+ energy from 6 ATP) → 6 RuBP (i.e. starting material regenerated)

2 G3P → glucose (6-carbon).

== In tryptophan biosynthesis ==
Glyceraldehyde 3-phosphate occurs as a byproduct in the biosynthesis pathway of tryptophan, an essential amino acid that cannot be produced by the human body.

== In thiamine biosynthesis ==
Glyceraldehyde 3-phosphate occurs as a reactant in the biosynthesis pathway of thiamine (Vitamin B_{1}), another substance that cannot be produced by the human body.
