= 3-Phosphoglyceric acid =

Names
- Preferred IUPAC name (2R)-2-Hydroxy-3-(phosphonooxy)propanoic acid

Identifiers
CAS Number	820-11-1
3D model (JSmol)	Interactive image
ChEBI	CHEBI:17794
ChEMBL	ChEMBL1160563
ChemSpider	388326
DrugBank	DB04510
KEGG	C00197
PubChem CID	439183
UNII	46ABA554FY
CompTox Dashboard (EPA)	DTXSID601002368
- InChI: InChI=1S/C3H7O7P/c4-2(3(5)6)1-10-11(7,8)9/h2,4H,1H2,(H,5,6)(H2,7,8,9)/t2-/m1/s1 Key: OSJPPGNTCRNQQC-UWTATZPHSA-N
- SMILES: C([C@H](C(=O)O)O)OP(=O)(O)O

Properties
Chemical formula	C_{3}H_{7}O_{7}P
Molar mass	186.06 g/mol
- Except where otherwise noted, data are given for materials in their standard state (at 25 °C [77 °F], 100 kPa). verify (what is ?) Infobox references

3-Phosphoglyceric acid (3PG, 3-PGA, or PGA) is the conjugate acid of 3-phosphoglycerate or glycerate 3-phosphate (GP or G3P). This glycerate is a biochemically significant metabolic intermediate in both glycolysis and the Calvin-Benson cycle. The anion is often termed as PGA when referring to the Calvin-Benson cycle. In the Calvin-Benson cycle, 3-phosphoglycerate is typically the product of the spontaneous scission of an unstable 6-carbon intermediate formed upon CO_{2} fixation. Thus, two equivalents of 3-phosphoglycerate are produced for each molecule of CO_{2} that is fixed. In glycolysis, 3-phosphoglycerate is an intermediate following the dephosphorylation (reduction) of 1,3-bisphosphoglycerate.

== Glycolysis ==
In the glycolytic pathway, 1,3-bisphosphoglycerate is dephosphorylated to form 3-phosphoglyceric acid in a coupled reaction producing two ATP via substrate-level phosphorylation. The single phosphate group left on the 3-PGA molecule then moves from an end carbon to a central carbon, producing 2-phosphoglycerate. (Note: Note that 3-phosphoglycerate and 2-phosphoglycerate are isomers of one another) This phosphate group relocation is catalyzed by phosphoglycerate mutase, an enzyme that also catalyzes the reverse reaction.

1,3-bisphospho-D-glycerate	3-phosphoglycerate kinase		3-phospho-D-glycerate	Phosphoglyceromutase	2-phospho-D-glycerate
	ADP	ATP
	ADP	ATP
	3-phosphoglycerate kinase			Phosphoglyceromutase

Compound C00236 at KEGG Pathway Database. Enzyme 2.7.2.3 at KEGG Pathway Database. Compound C00197 at KEGG Pathway Database. Enzyme 5.4.2.1 at KEGG Pathway Database. Compound C00631 at KEGG Pathway Database.

Click on genes, proteins and metabolites below to link to respective articles. (Note: The interactive pathway map can be edited at WikiPathways: "GlycolysisGluconeogenesis_WP534".)

Glycolysis and Gluconeogenesis edit

== Calvin-Benson cycle ==
In the light-independent reactions (also known as the Calvin-Benson cycle), two 3-phosphoglycerate molecules are synthesized. RuBP, a 5-carbon sugar, undergoes carbon fixation, catalyzed by the rubisco enzyme, to become an unstable 6-carbon intermediate. This intermediate is then cleaved into two, separate 3-carbon molecules of 3-PGA. One of the resultant 3-PGA molecules continues through the Calvin-Benson cycle to be regenerated into RuBP while the other is reduced to form one molecule of glyceraldehyde 3-phosphate (G3P) in two steps: the phosphorylation of 3-PGA into 1,3-bisphosphoglyceric acid via the enzyme phosphoglycerate kinase (the reverse of the reaction seen in glycolysis) and the subsequent catalysis by glyceraldehyde 3-phosphate dehydrogenase into G3P. G3P eventually reacts to form the sugars such as glucose or fructose or more complex starches.

== Amino acid synthesis ==
Glycerate 3-phosphate (formed from 3-phosphoglycerate) is also a precursor for serine, which, in turn, can create cysteine and glycine through the homocysteine cycle.

== Measurement ==
3-phosphoglycerate can be separated and measured using paper chromatography as well as with column chromatography and other chromatographic separation methods. It can be identified using both gas-chromatography and liquid-chromatography mass spectrometry and has been optimized for evaluation using tandem MS techniques.

== See also ==
- 2-Phosphoglyceric acid
- Calvin-Benson cycle
- Photosynthesis
- Ribulose 1,5-bisphosphate
