= 1,3-Bisphosphoglyceric acid =

Bisphosphoglyceric acid

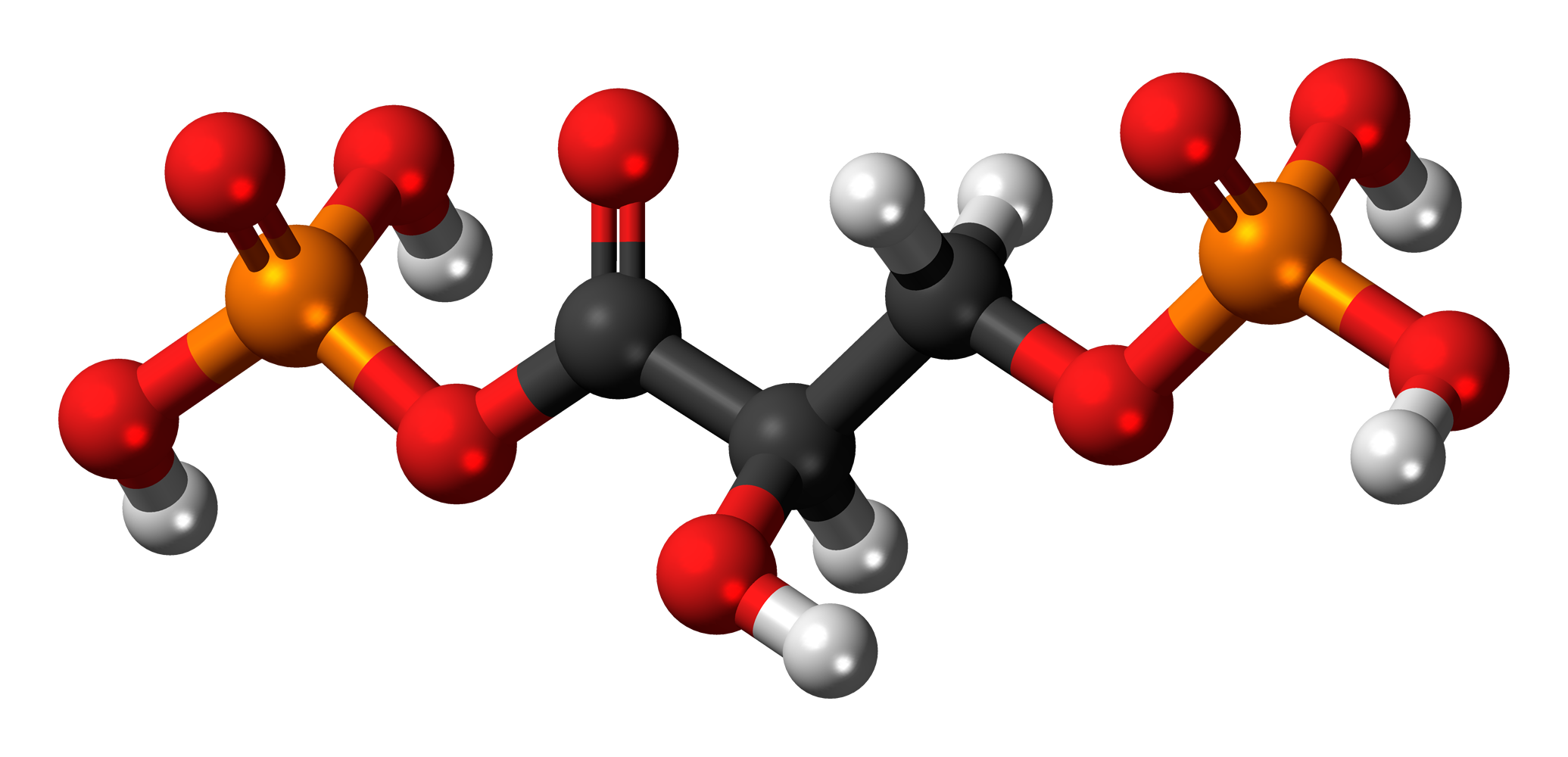

Names
- IUPAC name Phosphono 2-hydroxy-3-phosphonooxypropanoate
- Systematic IUPAC name (2-Hydroxy-3-phosphonooxy-propanoyloxy)phosphonic acid
- Other names 1,3-Diphosphoglycerate; Glycerate-1,3-bisphosphate; Glycerate-1,3-biphosphate; 1,3-Biphosphoglycerate; 3-Phosphoglyceroyl phosphate; Glyceric acid-1,3-diphosphate

Identifiers
CAS Number	1981-49-3
3D model (JSmol)	Interactive image
Abbreviations	1,3BPG; 1,3-BPG; PGAP
ChEBI	CHEBI:89363
ChEMBL	ChEMBL2074701
ChemSpider	663
KEGG	C00236
PubChem CID	683
CompTox Dashboard (EPA)	DTXSID50941636
- InChI: InChI=1S/C3H8O10P2/c4-2(1-12-14(6,7)8)3(5)13-15(9,10)11/h2,4H,1H2,(H2,6,7,8)(H2,9,10,11) Key: LJQLQCAXBUHEAZ-UHFFFAOYSA-N; InChI=1/C3H8O10P2/c4-2(1-12-14(6,7)8)3(5)13-15(9,10)11/h2,4H,1H2,(H2,6,7,8)(H2,9,10,11) Key: LJQLQCAXBUHEAZ-UHFFFAOYAI
- SMILES: O=C(OP(=O)(O)O)C(O)COP(=O)(O)O

Properties
Chemical formula	C_{3}H_{8}O_{10}P_{2}
Molar mass	266.035 g·mol^{−1}
- Except where otherwise noted, data are given for materials in their standard state (at 25 °C [77 °F], 100 kPa). verify (what is ?) Infobox references

1,3-Bisphosphoglyceric acid (1,3-Bisphosphoglycerate or 1,3BPG) is a three-carbon organic molecule present in most, if not all, living organisms. It primarily exists as a metabolic intermediate in both glycolysis during respiration and the Calvin cycle during photosynthesis. 1,3BPG is a transitional stage between glycerate 3-phosphate and glyceraldehyde 3-phosphate during the fixation/reduction of CO_{2}. 1,3BPG is also a precursor to 2,3-bisphosphoglycerate which is formed in the Luebering–Rapoport shunt of glycolysis in red blood cells.

== Biological structure and role ==
1,3-Bisphosphoglycerate is the conjugate base of 1,3-bisphosphoglyceric acid. It is phosphorylated at the number 1 and 3 carbons. The result of this phosphorylation gives 1,3BPG important biological properties such as the ability to donate a phosphate group to adenosine diphosphate (ADP) in order to form the energy storage molecule adenosine triphosphate (ATP).

=== In glycolysis ===
D-glyceraldehyde 3-phosphate	glyceraldehyde phosphate dehydrogenase		1,3-bisphospho-D-glycerate	3-phosphoglycerate kinase		3-phospho-D-glycerate
	NAD^{+} + P_{i}	NADH + H^{+}		ADP	ATP
	NAD^{+} + P_{i}	NADH + H^{+}		ADP	ATP
	glyceraldehyde phosphate dehydrogenase			3-phosphoglycerate kinase

Compound C00118 at KEGG Pathway Database. Enzyme 1.2.1.12 at KEGG Pathway Database. Compound C00236 at KEGG Pathway Database. Enzyme 2.7.2.3 at KEGG Pathway Database. Compound C00197 at KEGG Pathway Database.

1,3BPG is a macroergic metabolic intermediate in the glycolytic pathway. It is created by the exergonic oxidation of the aldehyde in glyceraldehyde 3-phosphate. The result of this oxidation is the conversion of the aldehyde group into a carboxylic acid group which drives the formation of an acyl phosphate bond. The latter reaction is the only step in the glycolytic pathway in which NAD^{+} is converted into NADH. The formation reaction of 1,3BPG requires the presence of an enzyme called glyceraldehyde-3-phosphate dehydrogenase.

The high-energy acyl phosphate bond of 1,3BPG is important in respiration as it assists in the formation of ATP. The molecule of ATP created during the following reaction is the first molecule produced during respiration. The reaction occurs as follows;

1,3-bisphosphoglycerate + ADP ⇌ 3-phosphoglycerate + ATP

The transfer of an inorganic phosphate from the carboxyl group on 1,3BPG to ADP to form ATP is reversible due to a low ΔG. This is as a result of one acyl phosphate bond being cleaved whilst another is created. This reaction is not naturally spontaneous and requires the presence of a catalyst. This role is performed by the enzyme phosphoglycerate kinase. During the reaction phosphoglycerate kinase undergoes a substrate induced conformational change similar to another metabolic enzyme called hexokinase.

Because two molecules of glyceraldehyde-3-phosphate are formed during glycolysis from one molecule of glucose, 1,3BPG can be said to be responsible for two of the ten molecules of ATP produced during the entire process. Glycolysis also uses two molecules of ATP in its initial stages as a committed and irreversible step. For this reason glycolysis is not reversible and has a net produce of 2 molecules of ATP and two of NADH. The two molecules of NADH themselves go on to produce approximately 3 molecules of ATP each.

Click on genes, proteins and metabolites below to link to respective articles. (Note: The interactive pathway map can be edited at WikiPathways: "GlycolysisGluconeogenesis_WP534".)

Glycolysis and Gluconeogenesis edit

=== In the Calvin cycle ===
1,3-BPG has a very similar role in the Calvin cycle to its role in the glycolytic pathway. For this reason both reactions are said to be analogous. However the reaction pathway is effectively reversed. The only other major difference between the two reactions is that NADPH is used as an electron donor in the calvin cycle whilst NAD^{+} is used as an electron acceptor in glycolysis. In this reaction cycle 1,3BPG originates from 3-phosphoglycerate and is made into glyceraldehyde 3-phosphate by the action of specific enzymes.

Contrary to the similar reactions of the glycolytic pathway, 1,3BPG in the Calvin cycle does not produce ATP but instead uses it. For this reason it can be considered to be an irreversible and committed step in the cycle. The outcome of this section of the cycle is an inorganic phosphate is removed from 1,3BPG as a hydrogen ion and two electrons are added to the compound^{+}.

In complete reverse of the glycolytic pathway reaction, the enzyme phosphoglycerate kinase catalyses the reduction of the carboxyl group of 1,3BPG to form an aldehyde instead. This reaction also releases an inorganic phosphate molecule which is subsequently used as energy for the donation of electrons from the conversion of NADPH to NADP^{+}. Overseeing this latter stage of the reaction is the enzyme glyceraldehyde-phosphate dehydrogenase.

=== In oxygen transfer ===
During normal metabolism in human erythrocytes, ≈19% of the 1,3BPG produced does not go any further in the glycolytic pathway. It is instead shunted through the Luebering–Rapoport pathway involving the reduction of ATP in the red blood cells. During this alternate pathway it is made into a similar molecule called 2,3-bisphosphoglyceric acid (2,3BPG). 2,3BPG is used as a mechanism to oversee the efficient release of oxygen from hemoglobin. Levels of this 1,3BPG will raise in a patient's blood when oxygen levels are low as this is one of the mechanisms of acclimatization. Low oxygen levels trigger a rise in 1,3BPG levels which in turn raises the level of 2,3BPG which alters the efficiency of oxygen dissociation from hemoglobin.
