= Catabolite repressor/activator =

Bacterial global transcription factor

Crystalline structure of catabolite repressor/activator (Cra) isolated from Escherichia coli K-12

Catabolite repressor/activator (Cra), formerly known as fructose repressor (FruR), is a global transcription factor found in enteric bacteria such as Escherichia coli and Salmonella. It plays a key role in gene regulation in carbon, nitrogen, and energy metabolic pathways. It has been shown that downregulation of other global regulators was counterbalanced by Cra in combination with other transcription factors. Additionally, the role of Cra as a global catabolic regulator allows for bioengineering of this gene for industrial purposes, such as increased resistance to environmental factors and increased product production. Catabolite repressor/activator (Cra) functions through dual mechanisms, meaning it also works by direct repression of genes that are involved in sugar utilization (glycolysis) because of steric hindrance at promoter regions, and by activation of genes for alternative pathways such as glyoxylate shunt, tricarboxylic acid (TCA) cycle, and gluconeogenesis. Intracellular effectors, mainly fructose-1-phosphate (F1P), bind to the C-terminal domain of Cra to remove the transcriptional repression. Cra regulates global carbon flux and cellular energetics by working together with the cAMP receptor protein (CRP) system and directly influencing crp gene expression.

== Structure ==
The Cra protein is tetrameric (composed of 4 protein subunits), and is classified in the LacI/GalR family. Each subunit contains two functional domains: the N-terminal domain, which binds directly to DNA, impacting transcription of the genes it binds to; and the C-terminal domain, which binds effector molecules, impacting the affinity of Cra for DNA and thus affecting activation or inhibition of those genes.

== Function ==
Cra can act both as a transcriptional repressor and an activator of gene expression. Its main function is to regulate genes that participate in bacterial metabolism and help bacteria adapt to the nutrients available. Furthermore, when repressing genes, Cra specifically stops the transcription of genes encoding glycolytic enzymes. It does this through operator positioning. When Cra's DNA binding operator site overlaps with the RNA polymerase binding site, steric hindrance prevents RNA polymerase from initiating transcription.

While Cra regulates genes activated by the cAMP-Crp complex, a study suggested that Cra plays a role in controlling crp gene expression. In this study, western blot analysis showed a lack of active crp promoter in strains lacking Cra. This reduced expression of sugar-utilizing genes relying on the cAMP-crp complex, leading to the conclusion that Cra regulates crp levels and thereby indirectly influences sugar-metabolizing pathways.

== Role in carbon metabolism ==
Cra was first identified as the fructose repressor (named FruR), as bacteria with a mutation in this gene were unable to grow on fructose or other gluconeogenic precursors, including acetate, pyruvate, alanine, citrate, or malate. However, further research revealed that Cra was responsible for much more than just the expression of these genes. Cra is known to activate genes that are expressed when sugar sources run low in an environment and repress genes responsible for sugar catabolism. Thus, the name of the protein is catabolite repressor/activator.

Cra acts as a repressor for several genes that are important in catabolism. It is known to repress the fruBKA operon, which is responsible for the importation, phosphorylation, and breakdown of fructose. It also represses pfkA and pykF, which encode the proteins phosphofructokinase-1 and pyruvate kinase respectively. These proteins are responsible for two of the three irreversible steps in glycolysis and are crucial for regulation of the glycolytic pathway. Cra is also involved in the repression of sugar transport systems. These include regulation of P_{ptsG}, the promoter that controls expression of the primary glucose transporter; P_{manX}, the promoter that controls expression of the mannose transporter; and P_{fruB}, the promoter that controls the expression of the transportation and phosphorylation of fructose (known as PTS).

In addition to its functions as a repressor, Cra is known to activate other genes important in main catabolic pathways. Among these is the activation of fbp and ppsA, which encode the enzymes fructose-1,6-bisphosphatase and PEP synthetase. These enzymes are responsible for two of the irreversible steps in gluconeogenesis. The activation of these genes correlates with the repression of phosphofructokinase-1 and pyruvate kinase, which, as noted above, are involved in the irreversible reactions of glycolysis.

Cra has also been observed interacting with other global regulators. For example, Cra directly interacts with c-di-GMP to regulate phosphofructokinase-1 (pfkA), pyruvate kinase II (pykA), 6-phosphofructokinase II (pfkB), and pyruvate kinase I (pykF). When c-di-GMP was overexpressed, increases in pfkA and pykF and decreases in pfkB and pykF were eliminated by deletion of Cra.

== Effector binding ==
Effectors are small sugar molecules that regulate Cra by binding to its C-terminal domain, inducing a conformational shift that releases the DNA it was bound to, so its target genes are no longer repressed or activated. For many years, fructose-1-phosphate (F1P) and fructose-1,6-bisphosphate (FBP) were thought to act as effectors of Cra. One study suggested that by responding to FBP levels in the cell, Cra works as a sensor of how fast glycolysis is running. However, later research found that FBP does not bind Cra directly and F1P is the real effector of Cra. This distinction is important because changes in FBP levels may reflect glycolytic activity without FBP directly binding to or regulating Cra.
