= Futile cycle =

Metabolic process

A futile cycle, also known as a substrate cycle, occurs when two metabolic pathways run simultaneously in opposite directions and have no overall effect other than to dissipate energy in the form of heat. The reason this cycle was called "futile" cycle was because it appeared that this cycle operated with no net utility for the organism. As such, it was thought of being a quirk of the metabolism and thus named a futile cycle. After further investigation it was seen that futile cycles are very important for regulating the concentrations of metabolites. For example, if glycolysis and gluconeogenesis were to be active at the same time, glucose would be converted to pyruvate by glycolysis and then converted back to glucose by gluconeogenesis, with an overall consumption of ATP.

The cycle does generate heat, and may be used to maintain thermal homeostasis, for example in the brown adipose tissue of young mammals, or to generate heat rapidly, for example in insect flight muscles and in hibernating animals during periodical arousal from torpor. These kinds of cycles may also have regulatory roles:

- The glucose metabolism substrate cycle is not a futile cycle but a regulatory process. For example, when energy is suddenly needed, ATP is replaced by AMP, a much more reactive adenine.
- Futile cycles may have a role in metabolic regulation, where a futile cycle would be a system oscillating between two states and very sensitive to small changes in the activity of any of the enzymes involved.

== Example: glucose ==
The simultaneous carrying out of glycolysis and gluconeogenesis is an example of a futile cycle, represented by the following equation:

ATP + H_{2}O ⇌ ADP + P_{i} + H

For example, during glycolysis, fructose-6-phosphate is converted to fructose-1,6-bisphosphate in a reaction catalysed by the enzyme phosphofructokinase 1 (PFK-1).

ATP + fructose-6-phosphate → fructose-1,6-bisphosphate + ADP

But during gluconeogenesis (i.e. synthesis of glucose from pyruvate and other compounds) the reverse reaction takes place, being catalyzed by fructose-1,6-bisphosphatase (FBPase-1).

fructose-1,6-bisphosphate + H_{2}O → fructose-6-phosphate + P_{i}

Giving an overall reaction of:

ATP + H_{2}O → ADP + P_{i} + heat

That is, hydrolysis of ATP without any useful metabolic work being done. Clearly, if these two reactions were allowed to proceed simultaneously at a high rate in the same cell, a large amount of chemical energy would be dissipated as heat. This uneconomical process has therefore been called a futile cycle.

=== Role in obesity and homeostasis ===
There are not many drugs that can effectively treat or reverse obesity. Obesity can increase ones risk of diseases primarily linked to health problems such as diabetes, hypertension, cardiovascular disease and even certain types of cancers. A study revolving around treatment and prevention of obesity using transgenic mice to experiment on reports positive feedback that proposes miR-378 may sure be a promising agent for preventing and treating obesity in humans. The study findings demonstrate that activation of the pyruvate-PEP futile cycle in skeletal muscle through miR-378 is the primary cause of elevated lipolysis in adipose tissues of miR-378 transgenic mice, and it helps orchestrate the crosstalk between muscle and fat to control energy homeostasis in mice.

Our general understanding of futile cycle is a substrate cycle, occurring when two overlapping metabolic pathways run in opposite directions, that when left without regulation will continue to go on uncontrolled without any actual production until all the cells energy is depleted. However, the idea behind the study indicates miR-378-activated pyruvate-phosphoenolpyruvate futile cycle plays a regulatory benefit. Not only does miR-378 result in lower body fat mass due to enhanced lipolysis it is also speculated that futile cycles regulate metabolism to maintain energy homeostasis. miR-378 has a unique function in regulating metabolic communication between the muscle and adipose tissues to control energy homeostasis at whole-body levels.

=== Examples in different species ===
To understand how presence of a futile cycle helps maintain low levels of ATP and generation heat in some species we look at metabolic pathways dealing with reciprocal regulation of glycolysis and gluconeogenesis.

==== Teleost fish ====
The swim bladder of many fish; such as zebrafish for example—is an organ internally filled with gas that helps contribute to their buoyancy. These gas gland cell are found to be located where the capillaries and nerves are found. Analyses of metabolic enzymes demonstrated that a gluconeogenesis enzyme fructose-1,6-bisphosphatase (Fbp1) and a glycolytic enzyme glyceraldehyde-3-phosphate dehydrogenase (Gapdh) are highly expressed in gas gland cells. The study signified that the characterization of the zebrafish swim bladder should not contain any expression fructose-1,6-bisphosphatase gene. The tissue of the swim bladder is known to be very high in glycogenic activity and lacking in gluconeogenesis, yet a predominant amount of Fbp was found to be expressed. This finding suggests that in the gas gland cell, Fbp forms an ATP-dependent metabolic futile cycle. Generation of heat is critically important for the gas gland cells to synthesize lactic acid because the process is strongly inhibited if ATP is accumulated.

Another example suggest that heat generation in fugu swim bladder will be transported out of the site of generation, however it may still be constantly recovered back through the rete mirabile so as to maintain the temperature of the gas gland higher than other areas of the body.

==== Insects ====
It was theorized that the futile cycle involving Fbp and Pfk could be used by bumblebees to produce heat in flight muscles and warm up their bodies considerably at low ambient temperatures. A recent study tracked Fbp activity in the thorax of various Bombus species and did not find a significant increase in Fbp expression, save for in Bombus rufocinctus.

== Other examples ==
Mathemetical modeling of chemical kinetics indicates that futile cycles may also act as:

- A way use the small "noise" in reaction rates to drive the oscillation of a reaction system between two (bistable) states, preventing it from being stuck in either state.
- A stabilizer to prevent the "noise" in reaction rates from affecting the whole network of chemical reactions. This has been observed in simulations of folate metabolism, specifically with the cycle operating between 5,10-methenyltetrahydrofolate and folinic acid.
