= Glycolytic oscillation =

In biochemistry, a glycolytic oscillation is the repetitive fluctuation of in the concentrations of metabolites, classically observed experimentally in yeast and muscle. The first observations of oscillatory behaviour in glycolysis were made by Duysens and Amesz in 1957. Glycolytic oscillations are typically induced in dense suspensions of cells exposed to glucose under anaerobic or semi- anaerobic conditions.

The problem of modelling glycolytic oscillation has been studied in control theory and dynamical systems since the 1960s since the behaviour depends on the rate of substrate injection. Early models used two variables, but the most complex behaviour they could demonstrate was period oscillations due to the Poincaré–Bendixson theorem, so later models introduced further variables.

== Mechanisms and coupling ==
Glycolytic oscillations are driven by feedback within the glycolytic pathway, where fluctuations in metabolite concentrations synchronize with other cellular processes. These oscillations are tightly coupled with mitochondrial membrane potential, mediated by the ADP/ATP antiporter and the F_{0}F_{1} - ATPase. The ATP/ADP ratio and proton gradients generated by these processes play a central role in this coupling. Experimental evidence shows that inhibitors targeting glycolysis, such as 2-deoxyglucose or iodoacetate, stop both NADH and mitochondrial membrane potential oscillations, highlighting the enzymatic regulation within the glycolytic pathway.

Mathematical models and experimental data further reveal that oscillations in mitochondrial membrane potential are in phase with NADH fluctuations. These synchronized dynamics show how energy metabolism and glycolysis are interconnected, with mitochondrial activity responding to changes in glycolytic flux.

== Role of intracellular ions ==
Potassium (K^{+}) is essential for glycolytic oscillations, with intracellular K^{+} concentrations oscillating in phase with NADH, ATP, and mitochondrial membrane potential. Mutants lacking K^{+} transporters, such as the mitochondrial K^{+}/H^{+} exchanger Mdm38p or the endosomal Nhx1p, fail to exhibit oscillatory behavior. Introducing the ionophore nigericin restores oscillation in Mdm38p-deficient strains, demonstrating the critical role of K^{+}/H^{+} exchange in sustaining glycolysis.

Potassium contributes to intracellular pH regulation and enzymatic activity in glycolysis, Reduced extracellular K^{+} levels decrease the amplitude of oscillations, confirming its importance in regulation.

== See also ==
- Electron transport chain
- Glycolysis
- Potassium ion channel
