= William John Young (biochemist) =

English biochemist (1878–1942)

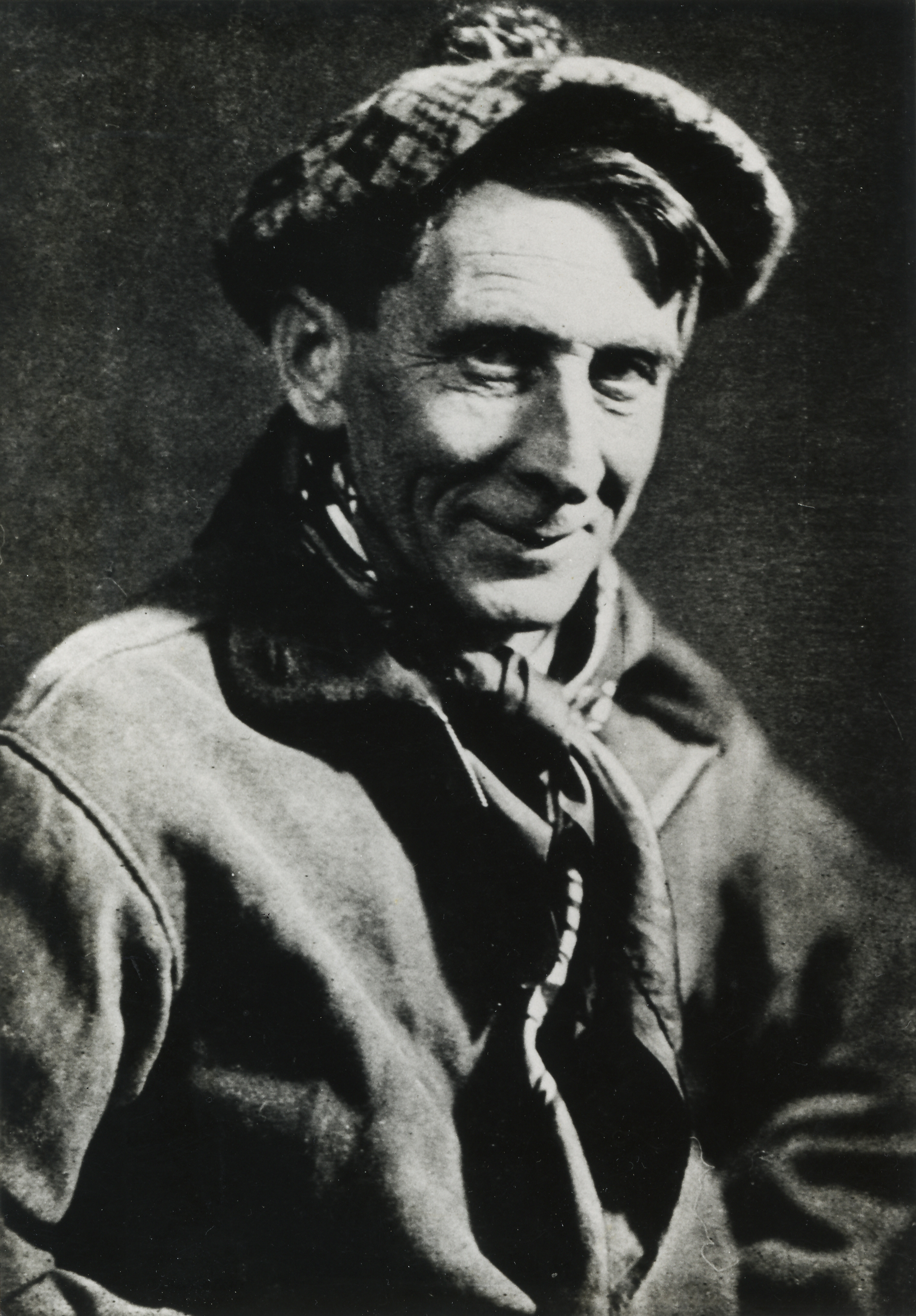
- Professor William John Young during his time at the University of Melbourne
- Born: 26 January 1878; Withington, Manchester, England
- Died: 14 May 1942 (aged 64); East Melbourne, Victoria, Australia
- Citizenship: British
- Education: Owens College, Manchester B.Sc. (1898), M.Sc. (1902)); University of London, D. Sc. (1910)
- Known for: Discovery of Harden–Young ester (fructose 1,6-bisphosphate)
- Scientific career
- Fields: Metabolic biochemistry
- Institutions: Lister Institute of Preventive Medicine, London; Australian Institute of Tropical Health and Medicine; University of Melbourne

William John Young (26 January 1878 – 14 May 1942) was an English biochemist.

== Early life ==
William John Young was born on 26 January 1878 in Withington, Manchester, England. He earned a Bachelor of Science degree in 1898 and a Master of Science degree in 1902, both at Owens College, Manchester. Young began his research early in his career, and was granted the Levinstein and Dalton research exhibitions for 1899-1900 and 1900-1901 respectively.

In 1910, Young received his D.Sc. from the University of London.

== Yeast fermentation experiment ==
(Harden, Young and Thompson,1911)

From 1900 to 1912, Young held the title of Assistant Biochemist at the Lister Institute of Preventive Medicine in London. He worked with Sir Arthur Harden on fermenting enzymes in yeast extract, extending the work of Eduard Buchner on cell-free alcoholic fermentation. In 1906, they found that heat-stable substances were necessary in addition to heat-sensitive enzymes, by observing that the rate of alcoholic fermentation in unboiled yeast extracts increased when boiled yeast extract was added. They soon discovered that salts of orthophosphoric acid stimulate fermentation. They developed an apparatus to collect and measure the gases that evolved during fermentation. This model employed a volumetric measurement of CO_{2}, while former apparatuses used a gravimetric measurement.

Using this apparatus, Harden and Young inadvertently discovered the sugar diphosphate in the system. That compound, which was initially called the Harden-Young ester, was later shown to be fructose 1,6-bisphosphate. This compound was the first chemical intermediate discovered in fermentation. Its discovery led to the ultimate description of fermentation in terms of molecular intermediates. Harden's and Young's general findings can be summarized as:

- 2C_{6}H_{12}O_{6} + 2Na_{2}HPO_{4} = C_{6}H_{10}O_{4}(PO_{4}Na_{2})+2H_{2}O + CO_{2} +2C_{2}H_{6}O;
- C_{6}H_{10}O_{4}(PO_{4}Na_{2})2 + H_{2}O = C_{6}H_{12}O_{6} + 2Na_{2}HPO_{4}

== Research in Australia ==
In 1913, Young and his family migrated to Queensland, Australia, where he was appointed Biochemist at the Australian Institute of Tropical Medicine, Townsville. In 1920, Young became a lecturer at the University of Melbourne. He was promoted to associate professor in 1924 and Foundation Professor in 1938 . During these years, his interests extended to the applied biochemistry of food preservation. He was a forerunner in refrigeration techniques, and some of his methods are still used with bananas.

While in Australia, Young conducted experiments related to blood biochemistry. In 1915, he performed experiments to compare the effects of salvarsan and neosalvarsan to the behavior of atoxyl in animal blood. He found that they were very similar, and all led to a form of arsenic associated with blood proteins. This arsenic was found to be localized to the plasma and the red blood cells.

In response to previous studies of the anti-tryptic action of blood serum, Young's experiments in 1918 investigated the possible mechanism of this anti-tryptic effect. His research led him to the tentative conclusion that trypsin was not a protein. In later research this conclusion was refuted. He did, however, provide valuable improvements to the techniques utilized in related research.

In 1920, Young embarked on an investigation of the pigment melanin found in the skin and hair of animals and humans. He found that it could be extracted by treatment with dilute alkali. This research provided insight into the structure of melanin and its role in hair and skin.
