= PFP (enzyme) =

Class of enzymes

Diphosphate—fructose-6-phosphate 1-phosphotransferase
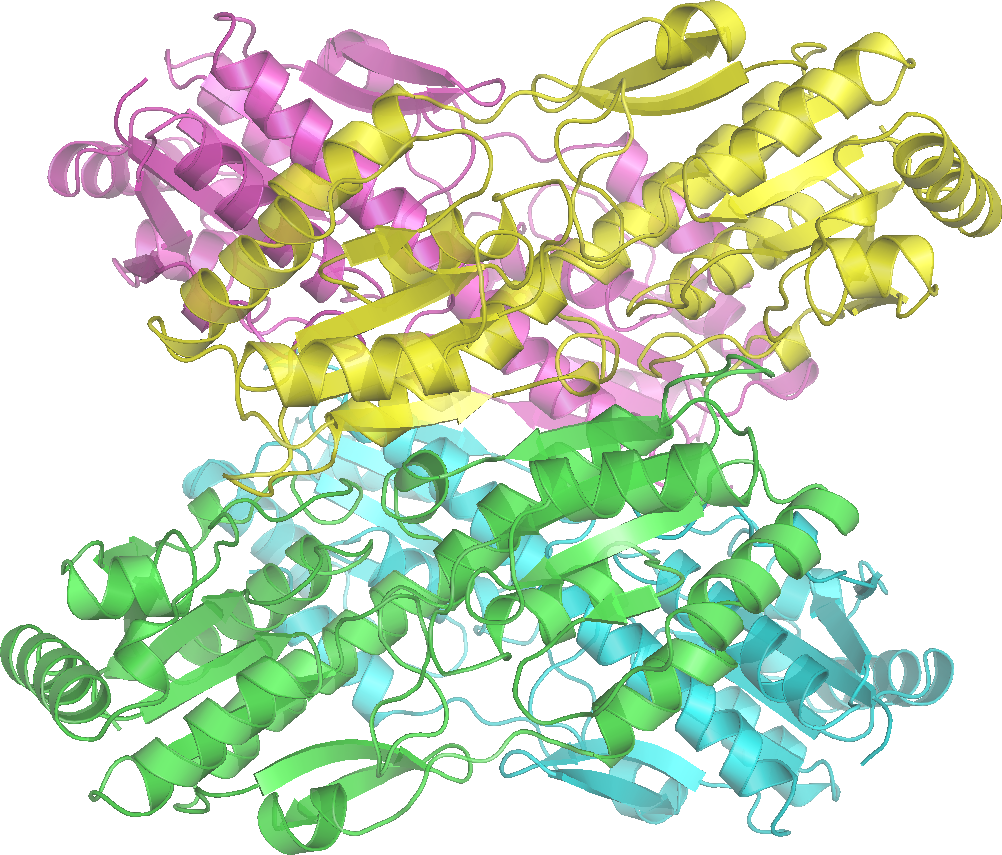
- Bacillus stearothermophilus phosphofructokinase.

Identifiers
- EC no.: 2.7.1.90
- CAS no.: 55326-40-4

Databases
- IntEnz: IntEnz view
- BRENDA: BRENDA entry
- ExPASy: NiceZyme view
- KEGG: KEGG entry
- MetaCyc: metabolic pathway
- PRIAM: profile
- PDB structures: RCSB PDB PDBe PDBsum
- Gene Ontology: AmiGO / QuickGO
Search
- PMC: articles
- PubMed: articles
- NCBI: proteins

Diphosphate—fructose-6-phosphate 1-phosphotransferase also known as PFP is an enzyme of carbohydrate metabolism in plants and some bacteria. The enzyme (EC 2.7.1.90) catalyses the reversible interconversion of fructose 6-phosphate and fructose 1,6-bisphosphate using inorganic pyrophosphate as the phosphoryl donor:

pyrophosphate +
fructose 6-phosphate
phosphate +
fructose 1,6-bisphosphate

In plants, the PFP is located in the cytosol of the cell and is strongly activated by the signal molecule fructose 2,6-bisphosphate.

PFP is an exclusively cytosolic enzyme that catalyses the phosphorylation of fructose-6-phosphate to fructose-1,6-bisphosphate in the glycolytic direction, and the de-phosphorylation of fructose-1,6-bisphosphate to fructose-6-phosphate in the gluconeogenic reaction. Reeves first isolated PFP from Entamoeba histolytica, a lower eukaryote. The first plant PFP isolated was from the leaves of pineapples by Carnal and Black and it has since been isolated from a variety of plant species and tissues.

== Nomenclature ==
This enzyme belongs to the family of transferases, specifically those transferring phosphorus-containing groups (phosphotransferases) with an alcohol group as acceptor. The systematic name of this enzyme class is diphosphate:D-fructose-6-phosphate 1-phosphotransferase. Other names in common use include:

- 6-phosphofructokinase (pyrophosphate),
- inorganic pyrophosphate-dependent phosphofructokinase,
- inorganic pyrophosphate-phosphofructokinase,
- pyrophosphate-dependent phosphofructo-1-kinase, and
- pyrophosphate-fructose 6-phosphate 1-phosphotransferase,
- pyrophosphate-fructose 6-phosphate phosphotransferase

== See also ==
- Phosphofructokinase
