= Pyruvate kinase =

Class of enzymes

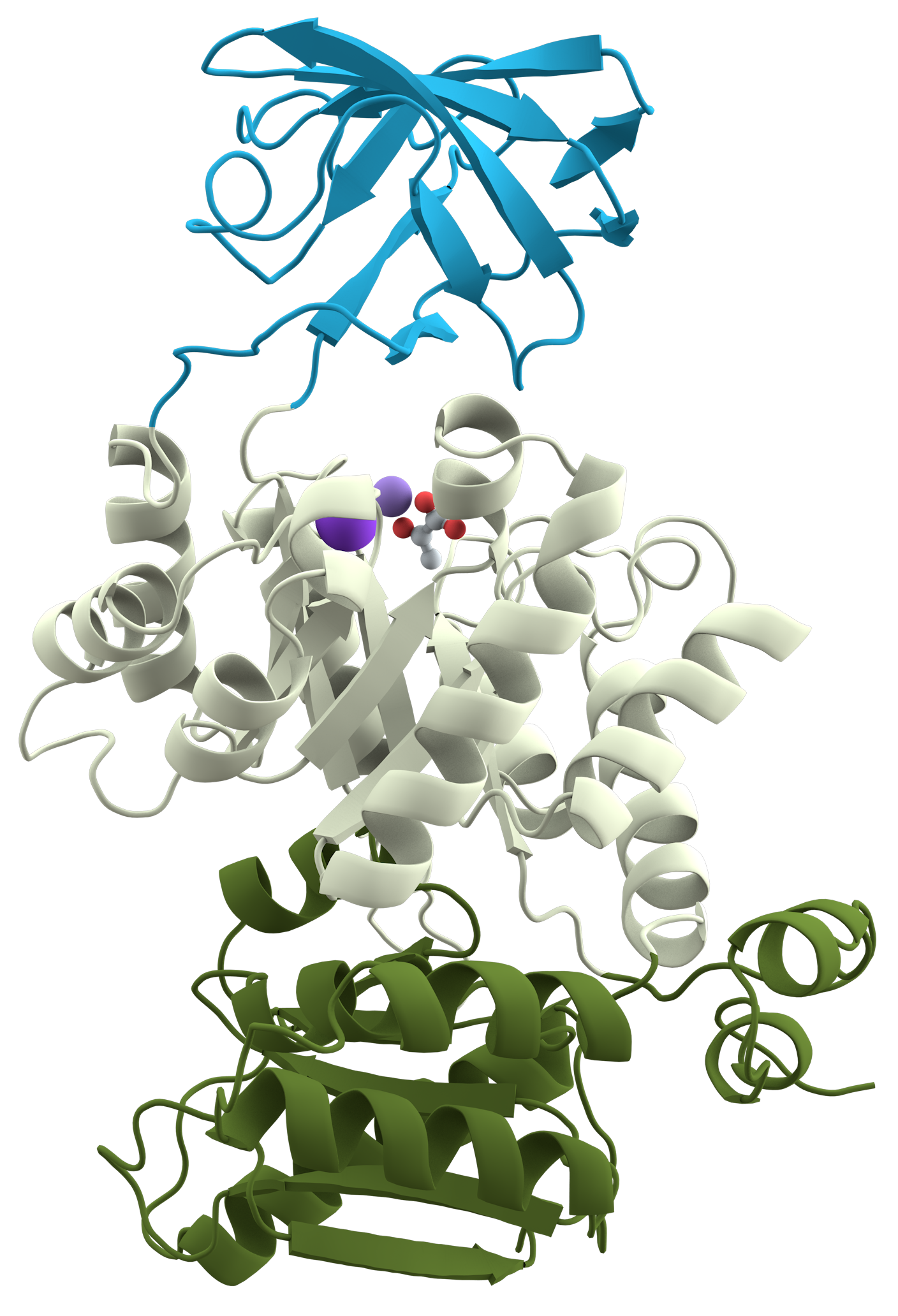
- 3D structure of pyruvate kinase (1PKN)

Identifiers
- EC no.: 2.7.1.40
- CAS no.: 9001-59-6

Databases
- BRENDA: enzyme data
- ExPASy: NiceZyme view
- KEGG: enzyme entry
- MetaCyc: metabolic pathway
- Rhea: reactions
- PDB structures: RCSB PDB PDBe PDBsum
- Gene Ontology: AmiGO / QuickGO
Search
- PMC: articles
- PubMed: articles
- NCBI: proteins

Pyruvate kinase is the enzyme involved in the last step of glycolysis. It catalyzes the transfer of a phosphate group from phosphoenolpyruvic acid (PEP) to adenosine diphosphate (ADP), yielding one molecule of pyruvic acid and one molecule of adenosine triphosphate (ATP).

ADP +
PEP
ATP +
pyruvic acid

Pyruvate kinase was inappropriately named (inconsistently with a conventional kinase) before it was recognized that it did not directly catalyze phosphorylation of pyruvic acid, which does not occur under physiological conditions. Pyruvate kinase is present in four distinct, tissue-specific isozymes in animals, each consisting of particular kinetic properties necessary to accommodate the variations in metabolic requirements of diverse tissues.

== Isozymes in vertebrates ==
Four isozymes of pyruvate kinase expressed in vertebrates: L (liver), R (erythrocytes), M1 (muscle and brain) and M2 (early fetal tissue and most adult tissues). The L and R isozymes are expressed by the gene PKLR, whereas the M1 and M2 isozymes are expressed by the gene PKM2. The R and L isozymes differ from M1 and M2 in that they are allosterically regulated. Kinetically, the R and L isozymes of pyruvate kinase have two distinct conformation states; one with a high substrate affinity and one with a low substrate affinity. The R-state, characterized by high substrate affinity, serves as the activated form of pyruvate kinase and is stabilized by PEP and fructose 1,6-bisphosphate (FBP), promoting the glycolytic pathway. The T-state, characterized by low substrate affinity, serves as the inactivated form of pyruvate kinase, bound and stabilized by ATP and alanine, causing phosphorylation of pyruvate kinase and the inhibition of glycolysis. The M2 isozyme of pyruvate kinase can form tetramers or dimers. Tetramers have a high affinity for PEP, whereas, dimers have a low affinity for PEP. Enzymatic activity can be regulated by phosphorylating highly active tetramers of PKM2 into an inactive dimers.

The PKM gene consists of 12 exons and 11 introns. PKM1 and PKM2 are different splicing products of the M-gene (PKM1 contains exon 9 while PKM2 contains exon 10) and solely differ in 23 amino acids within a 56-amino acid stretch (aa 378-434) at their carboxy terminus. The PKM gene is regulated through heterogenous ribonucleotide proteins like hnRNPA1 and hnRNPA2. Human PKM2 monomer has 531 amino acids and is a single chain divided into A, B and C domains. The difference in amino acid sequence between PKM1 and PKM2 allows PKM2 to be allosterically regulated by FBP and for it to form dimers and tetramers while PKM1 can only form tetramers.

== Isozymes in bacteria ==
Many Enterobacteriaceae, including E. coli, have two isoforms of pyruvate kinase, PykA and PykF, which are 37% identical in E. coli (Uniprot: PykA, PykF). They catalyze the same reaction as in eukaryotes, namely the generation of ATP from ADP and PEP, the last step in glycolysis, a step that is irreversible under physiological conditions. PykF is allosterically regulated by FBP which reflects the central position of PykF in cellular metabolism. PykF transcription in E. coli is regulated by the global transcriptional regulator, Cra (FruR). PfkB was shown to be inhibited by MgATP at low concentrations of Fru-6P, and this regulation is important for gluconeogenesis.

== Reaction ==
=== Glycolysis ===
There are two steps in the pyruvate kinase reaction in glycolysis. First, PEP transfers a phosphate group to ADP, producing ATP and the enolate of pyruvate. Secondly, a proton must be added to the enolate of pyruvate to produce the functional form of pyruvate that the cell requires. Because the substrate for pyruvate kinase is a simple phospho-sugar, and the product is an ATP, pyruvate kinase is a possible foundation enzyme for the evolution of the glycolysis cycle, and may be one of the most ancient enzymes in all earth-based life. Phosphoenolpyruvate may have been present abiotically, and has been shown to be produced in high yield in a primitive triose glycolysis pathway.

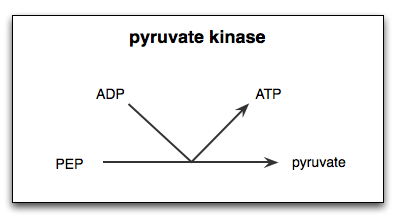
A simple diagram demonstrating the final step of glycolysis, the transfer of a phosphate group from phosphoenolpyruvate (PEP) to adenosine diphosphate (ADP) by pyruvate kinase, yielding one molecule of pyruvate and one molecule of ATP.

In yeast cells, the interaction of yeast pyruvate kinase (YPK) with PEP and its allosteric effector Fructose 1,6-bisphosphate (FBP,) was found to be enhanced by the presence of Mg^{2+}. Therefore, Mg^{2+} was concluded to be an important cofactor in the catalysis of PEP into pyruvate by pyruvate kinase. Furthermore, the metal ion Mn^{2+} was shown to have a similar, but stronger effect on YPK than Mg^{2+}. The binding of metal ions to the metal binding sites on pyruvate kinase enhances the rate of this reaction.

The reaction catalyzed by pyruvate kinase is the final step of glycolysis. It is one of three rate-limiting steps of this pathway. Rate-limiting steps are the slower, regulated steps of a pathway and thus determine the overall rate of the pathway. In glycolysis, the rate-limiting steps are coupled to either the hydrolysis of ATP or the phosphorylation of ADP, causing the pathway to be energetically favorable and essentially irreversible in cells. This final step is highly regulated and deliberately irreversible because pyruvate is a crucial intermediate building block for further metabolic pathways. Once pyruvate is produced, it either enters the TCA cycle for further production of ATP under aerobic conditions, or is converted to lactic acid or ethanol under anaerobic conditions.

=== Gluconeogenesis: the reverse reaction ===
Pyruvate kinase also serves as a regulatory enzyme for gluconeogenesis, a biochemical pathway in which the liver generates glucose from pyruvate and other substrates. Gluconeogenesis utilizes noncarbohydrate sources to provide glucose to the brain and red blood cells in times of starvation when direct glucose reserves are exhausted. During fasting state, pyruvate kinase is inhibited, thus preventing the "leak-down" of phosphoenolpyruvate from being converted into pyruvate; instead, phosphoenolpyruvate is converted into glucose via a cascade of gluconeogenesis reactions. Although it utilizes similar enzymes, gluconeogenesis is not the reverse of glycolysis. It is instead a pathway that circumvents the irreversible steps of glycolysis. Furthermore, gluconeogenesis and glycolysis do not occur concurrently in the cell at any given moment as they are reciprocally regulated by cell signaling. Once the gluconeogenesis pathway is complete, the glucose produced is expelled from the liver, providing energy for the vital tissues in the fasting state.

== Regulation ==
Glycolysis is highly regulated at three of its catalytic steps: the phosphorylation of glucose by hexokinase, the phosphorylation of fructose-6-phosphate by phosphofructokinase, and the transfer of phosphate from PEP to ADP by pyruvate kinase. Under wild-type conditions, all three of these reactions are irreversible, have a large negative free energy and are responsible for the regulation of this pathway. Pyruvate kinase activity is most broadly regulated by allosteric effectors, covalent modifiers and hormonal control. However, the most significant pyruvate kinase regulator is fructose-1,6-bisphosphate (FBP), which serves as an allosteric effector for the enzyme.

=== Allosteric effectors ===
Allosteric regulation is the binding of an effector to a site on the protein other than the active site, causing a conformational change and altering the activity of that given protein or enzyme. Pyruvate kinase has been found to be allosterically activated by FBP and allosterically inactivated by ATP and alanine. Pyruvate Kinase tetramerization is promoted by FBP and Serine while tetramer dissociation is promoted by L-Cysteine.

==== Fructose-1,6-bisphosphate ====
FBP is the most significant source of regulation because it comes from within the glycolysis pathway. FBP is a glycolytic intermediate produced from the phosphorylation of fructose 6-phosphate. FBP binds to the allosteric binding site on domain C of pyruvate kinase and changes the conformation of the enzyme, causing the activation of pyruvate kinase activity. As an intermediate present within the glycolytic pathway, FBP provides feedforward stimulation because the higher the concentration of FBP, the greater the allosteric activation and magnitude of pyruvate kinase activity. Pyruvate kinase is most sensitive to the effects of FBP. As a result, the remainder of the regulatory mechanisms serve as secondary modification.

=== Covalent modifiers ===
Covalent modifiers serve as indirect regulators by controlling the phosphorylation, dephosphorylation, acetylation, succinylation and oxidation of enzymes, resulting in the activation and inhibition of enzymatic activity. In the liver, glucagon and epinephrine activate protein kinase A, which serves as a covalent modifier by phosphorylating and deactivating pyruvate kinase. In contrast, the secretion of insulin in response to blood sugar elevation activates phosphoprotein phosphatase I, causing the dephosphorylation and activation of pyruvate kinase to increase glycolysis. The same covalent modification has the opposite effect on gluconeogenesis enzymes. This regulation system is responsible for the avoidance of a futile cycle through the prevention of simultaneous activation of pyruvate kinase and enzymes that catalyze gluconeogenesis.

=== Hormonal control ===
In order to prevent a futile cycle, glycolysis and gluconeogenesis are heavily regulated in order to ensure that they are never operating in the cell at the same time. As a result, the inhibition of pyruvate kinase by glucagon, cyclic AMP and epinephrine, not only shuts down glycolysis, but also stimulates gluconeogenesis. Alternatively, insulin interferes with the effect of glucagon, cyclic AMP and epinephrine, causing pyruvate kinase to function normally and gluconeogenesis to be shut down. Furthermore, glucose was found to inhibit and disrupt gluconeogenesis, leaving pyruvate kinase activity and glycolysis unaffected. Overall, the interaction between hormones plays a key role in the functioning and regulation of glycolysis and gluconeogenesis in the cell.

==== Inhibitory effect of metformin ====
Metformin, or dimethylbiguanide, is the primary treatment used for type 2 diabetes. Metformin has been shown to indirectly affect pyruvate kinase through the inhibition of gluconeogenesis. Specifically, the addition of metformin is linked to a marked decrease in glucose flux and increase in lactate/pyruvate flux from various metabolic pathways. Although metformin does not directly affect pyruvate kinase activity, it causes a decrease in the concentration of ATP. Due to the allosteric inhibitory effects of ATP on pyruvate kinase, a decrease in ATP results in diminished inhibition and the subsequent stimulation of pyruvate kinase. Consequently, the increase in pyruvate kinase activity directs metabolic flux through glycolysis rather than gluconeogenesis.

=== Gene Regulation ===
Heterogenous ribonucleotide proteins (hnRNPs) can act on the PKM gene to regulate expression of M1 and M2 isoforms. PKM1 and PKM2 isoforms are splice variants of the PKM gene that differ by a single exon. Various types of hnRNPs such as hnRNPA1 and hnRNPA2 enter the nucleus during hypoxia conditions and modulate expression such that PKM2 is up-regulated. Hormones such as insulin up-regulate expression of PKM2 while hormones like tri-iodothyronine (T3) and glucagon aid in down-regulating PKM2.

==== Carbohydrate response element binding protein (ChREBP) ====
ChREBP is a transcription factor that regulates expression of the L isozyme of pyruvate kinase. A glucose-sensing module contains domains that are targets for regulatory phosphorylation based on the concentrations of glucose and cAMP, which then control its import into the nucleus. It may also be further activated by directly binding glucose-6-phosphate. Once in the nucleus, its DNA binding domains activate pyruvate kinase transcription. Therefore, high glucose and low cAMP causes dephosphorylation of ChREBP, which then upregulates expression of pyruvate kinase in the liver.

== Clinical applications ==
=== Deficiency ===
Genetic defects of this enzyme cause the disease known as pyruvate kinase deficiency. In this condition, a lack of pyruvate kinase slows down the process of glycolysis. This effect is especially devastating in cells that lack mitochondria, because these cells must use anaerobic glycolysis as their sole source of energy because the TCA cycle is not available. For example, red blood cells, which in a state of pyruvate kinase deficiency, rapidly become deficient in ATP and can undergo hemolysis. Therefore, pyruvate kinase deficiency can cause chronic nonspherocytic hemolytic anemia (CNSHA).

==== PK-LR gene mutation ====
Pyruvate kinase deficiency is caused by an autosomal recessive trait. Mammals have two pyruvate kinase genes, PK-LR (which encodes for pyruvate kinase isozymes L and R) and PK-M (which encodes for pyruvate kinase isozyme M1), but only PKLR encodes for the red blood isozyme which effects pyruvate kinase deficiency. Over 250 PK-LR gene mutations have been identified and associated with pyruvate kinase deficiency. DNA testing has guided the discovery of the location of PKLR on chromosome 1 and the development of direct gene sequencing tests to molecularly diagnose pyruvate kinase deficiency.

=== Applications of pyruvate kinase inhibition ===
==== Reactive Oxygen Species (ROS) Inhibition ====
Reactive oxygen species (ROS) are chemically reactive forms of oxygen. In human lung cells, ROS has been shown to inhibit the M2 isozyme of pyruvate kinase (PKM2). ROS achieves this inhibition by oxidizing Cys358 and inactivating PKM2. As a result of PKM2 inactivation, glucose flux is no longer converted into pyruvate, but is instead utilized in the pentose phosphate pathway, resulting in the reduction and detoxification of ROS. In this manner, the harmful effects of ROS are increased and cause greater oxidative stress on the lung cells, leading to potential tumor formation. This inhibitory mechanism is important because it may suggest that the regulatory mechanisms in PKM2 are responsible for aiding cancer cell resistance to oxidative stress and enhanced tumorigenesis.

==== Phenylalanine inhibition ====
Phenylalanine is found to function as a competitive inhibitor of pyruvate kinase in the brain. Although the degree of phenylalanine inhibitory activity is similar in both fetal and adult cells, the enzymes in the fetal brain cells are significantly more vulnerable to inhibition than those in adult brain cells. A study of PKM2 in babies with the genetic brain disease phenylketonurics (PKU), showed elevated levels of phenylalanine and decreased effectiveness of PKM2. This inhibitory mechanism provides insight into the role of pyruvate kinase in brain cell damage.

=== Pyruvate Kinase in Cancer ===
Cancer cells have characteristically accelerated metabolic machinery and Pyruvate Kinase is believed to have a role in cancer. When compared to healthy cells, cancer cells have elevated levels of the PKM2 isoform, specifically the low activity dimer. Therefore, PKM2 serum levels are used as markers for cancer. The low activity dimer allows for build-up of phosphoenol pyruvate (PEP), leaving large concentrations of glycolytic intermediates for synthesis of biomolecules that will eventually be used by cancer cells. Phosphorylation of PKM2 by Mitogen-activated protein kinase 1 (ERK2) causes conformational changes that allow PKM2 to enter the nucleus and regulate glycolytic gene expression required for tumor development. Some studies state that there is a shift in expression from PKM1 to PKM2 during carcinogenesis. Tumor microenvironments like hypoxia activate transcription factors like the hypoxia-inducible factor to promote the transcription of PKM2, which forms a positive feedback loop to enhance its own transcription.

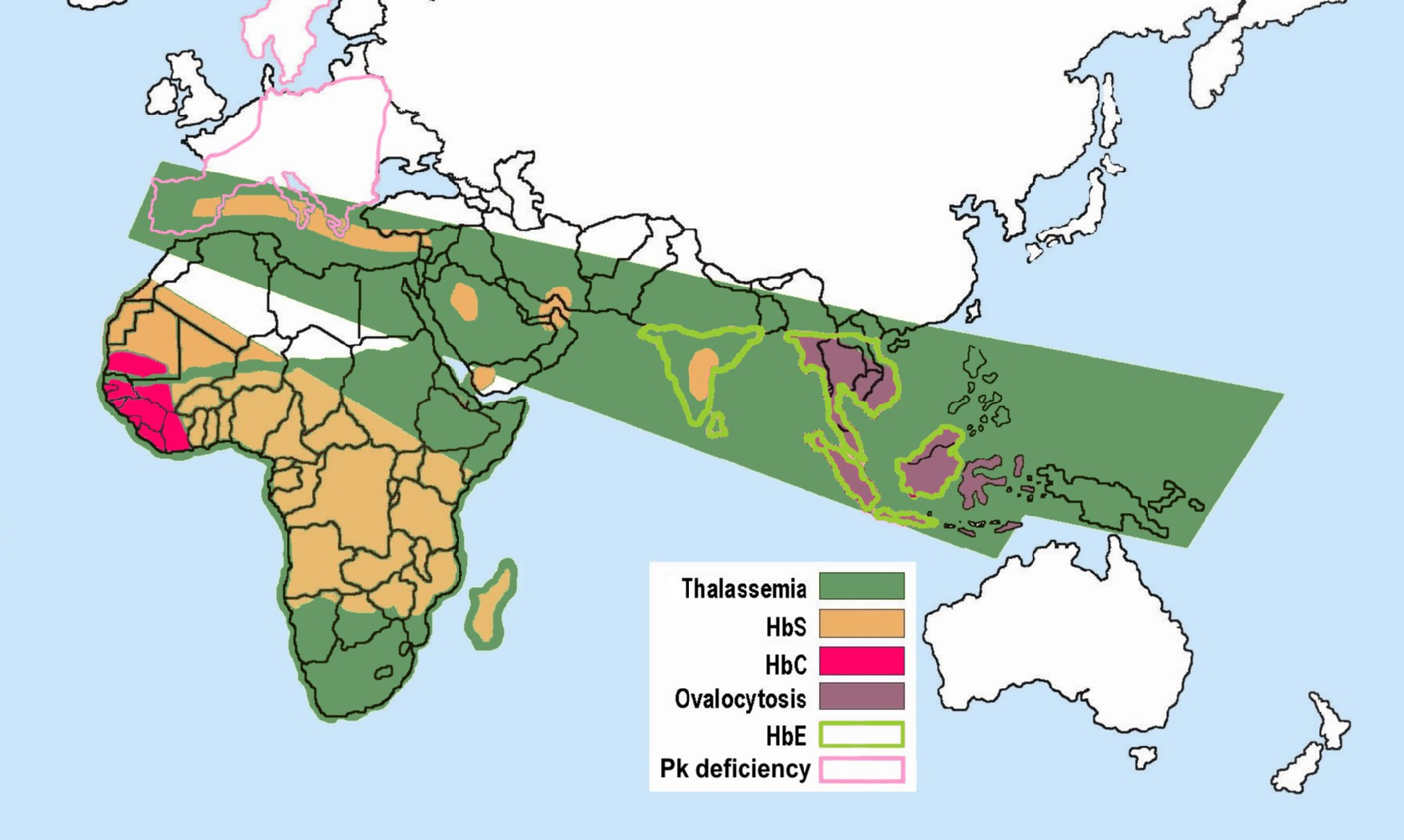
Distribution of red blood cell abnormalities worldwide

== Alternatives ==
A reversible enzyme with a similar function, pyruvate phosphate dikinase (PPDK), is found in some bacteria and has been transferred to a number of anaerobic eukaryote groups (for example, Streblomastix, Giardia, Entamoeba, and Trichomonas), it seems via horizontal gene transfer on two or more occasions. In some cases, the same organism will have both pyruvate kinase and PPDK.
