= Fructose 1,6-bisphosphatase =

Class of enzymes

fructose-1,6-bisphosphatase 1
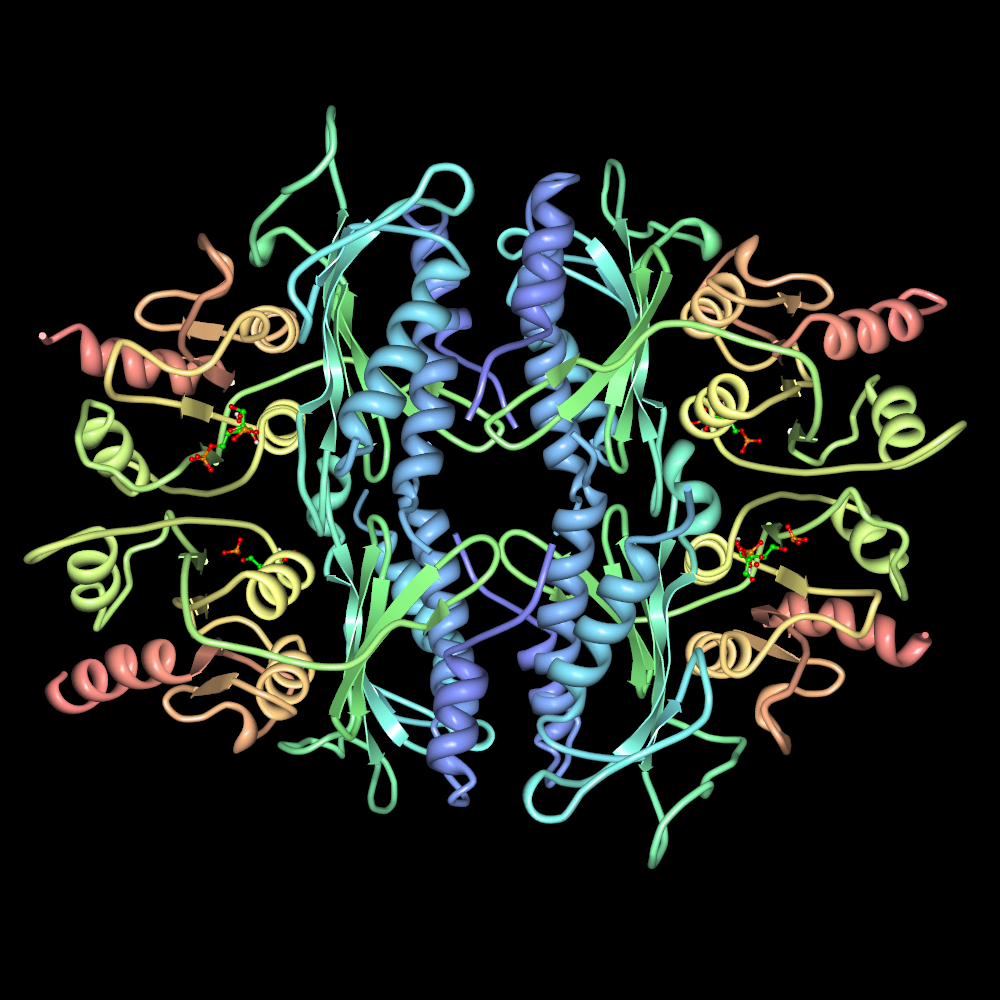
- Fructose-1,6-bisphosphatase and its fructose 2,6-bisphosphate complex. Rendered from PDB 3FBP.

Identifiers
- Symbol: FBP1
- Alt. symbols: FBP
- NCBI gene: 2203
- HGNC: 3606
- OMIM: 229700
- RefSeq: NM_000507
- UniProt: P09467

Other data
- EC number: 3.1.3.11
- Locus: Chr. 9 q22.3
Search for
- Structures: Swiss-model
- Domains: InterPro

Fructose-1-6-bisphosphatase
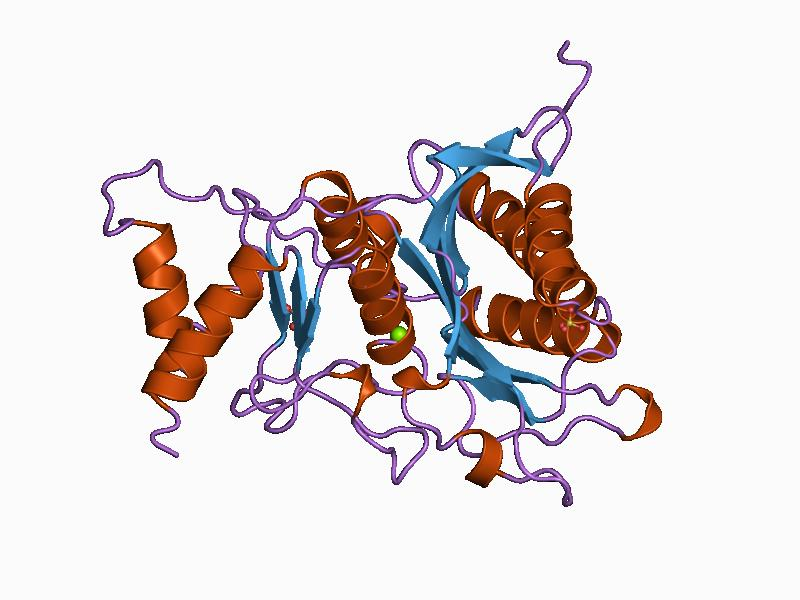
- crystal structure of rabbit liver fructose-1,6-bisphosphatase at 2.3 angstrom resolution

Identifiers
- Symbol: FBPase
- Pfam: PF00316
- Pfam clan: CL0171
- InterPro: IPR000146
- PROSITE: PDOC00114
- SCOP2: 1frp / SCOPe / SUPFAM
Available protein structures:
- PDB: IPR000146 PF00316 (ECOD; PDBsum)
- AlphaFold: IPR000146; PF00316

Firmicute fructose-1,6-bisphosphatase

Identifiers
- Symbol: FBPase_2
- Pfam: PF06874
- Pfam clan: CL0163
- InterPro: IPR009164
Available protein structures:
- PDB: IPR009164 PF06874 (ECOD; PDBsum)
- AlphaFold: IPR009164; PF06874

Fructose-1,6-bisphosphatase
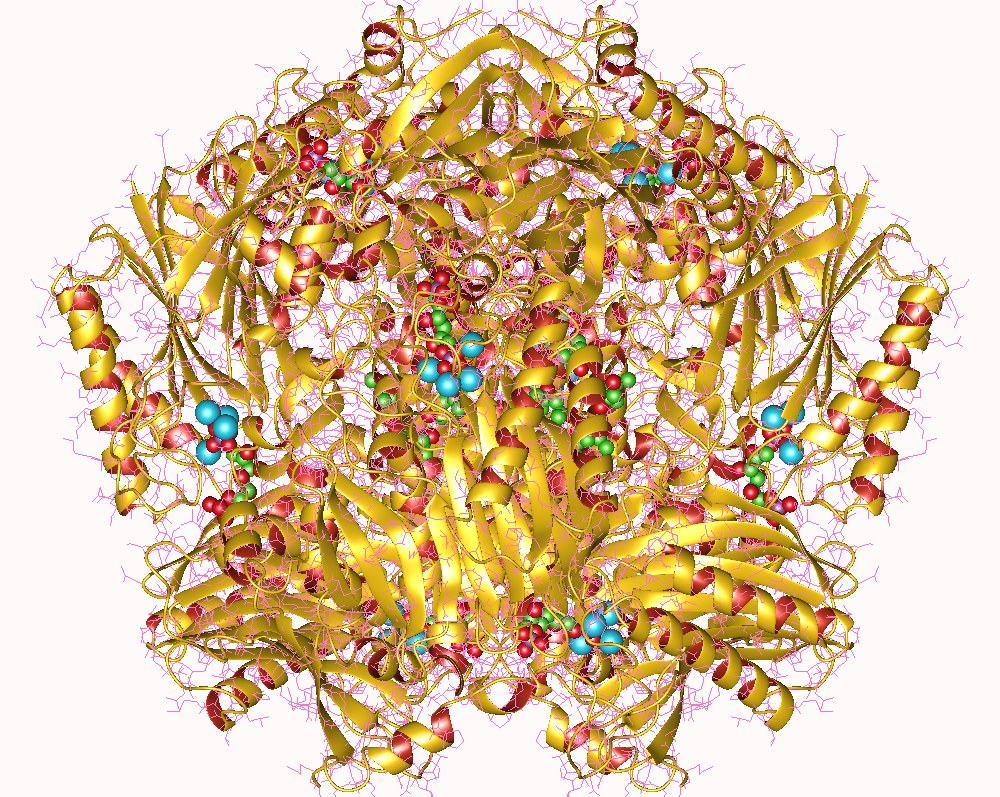
- crystal structure of fructose-1,6-bisphosphatase

Identifiers
- Symbol: FBPase_3
- Pfam: PF01950
- InterPro: IPR002803
- SCOP2: 1umg / SCOPe / SUPFAM
Available protein structures:
- PDB: IPR002803 PF01950 (ECOD; PDBsum)
- AlphaFold: IPR002803; PF01950

The enzyme fructose bisphosphatase (EC 3.1.3.11; systematic name D-fructose-1,6-bisphosphate 1-phosphohydrolase) catalyses the conversion of fructose-1,6-bisphosphate to fructose 6-phosphate in gluconeogenesis and the Calvin cycle, which are both anabolic pathways:

fructose 1,6-bisphosphate
H_{2}O
P_{i}
fructose 6-phosphate

Phosphofructokinase (EC 2.7.1.11) catalyses the reverse reaction, the conversion of fructose 6-phosphate to fructose-1,6-bisphosphate, but the co-substrates are different (and so thermodynamic requirements are not violated). The two enzymes are complementary, and are regulated by metabolites such as fructose 2,6-bisphosphate so that high activity of one of them is accompanied by low activity of the other. Specifically, fructose 2,6-bisphosphate allosterically inhibits fructose 1,6-bisphosphatase, but activates phosphofructokinase-I. Fructose 1,6-bisphosphatase is involved in many different metabolic pathways and found in most organisms. FBPase requires metal ions for catalysis (Mg^{2+} and Mn^{2+} being preferred) and the enzyme is potently inhibited by Li^{+}.

== Structure ==
The fold of fructose-1,6-bisphosphatase from pigs was noted to be identical to that of inositol-1-phosphatase (IMPase). Inositol polyphosphate 1-phosphatase (IPPase), IMPase and FBPase share a sequence motif (Asp-Pro-Ile/Leu-Asp-Gly/Ser-Thr/Ser) which has been shown to bind metal ions and participate in catalysis. This motif is also found in the distantly-related fungal, bacterial and yeast IMPase homologues. It has been suggested that these proteins define an ancient structurally conserved family involved in diverse metabolic pathways, including inositol signalling, gluconeogenesis, sulphate assimilation and possibly quinone metabolism.

== Species distribution ==
Three different groups of FBPases have been identified in eukaryotes and bacteria (FBPase I-III). None of these groups have been found in Archaea so far, though a new group of FBPases (FBPase IV) which also show inositol monophosphatase activity has recently been identified in Archaea.

A new group of FBPases (FBPase V) is found in thermophilic archaea and the hyperthermophilic bacterium Aquifex aeolicus. The characterised members of this group show strict substrate specificity for FBP and are suggested to be the true FBPase in these organisms. A structural study suggests that FBPase V has a novel fold for a sugar phosphatase, forming a four-layer alpha-beta-beta-alpha sandwich, unlike the more usual five-layered alpha-beta-alpha-beta-alpha arrangement. The arrangement of the catalytic side chains and metal ligands was found to be consistent with the three-metal ion assisted catalysis mechanism proposed for other FBPases.

The fructose 1,6-bisphosphatases found within the Bacillota (low GC Gram-positive bacteria) do not show any significant sequence similarity to the enzymes from other organisms. The Bacillus subtilis enzyme is inhibited by AMP, though this can be overcome by phosphoenolpyruvate, and is dependent on Mn(2+). Mutants lacking this enzyme are apparently still able to grow on gluconeogenic growth substrates such as malate and glycerol.

== Interactive pathway map ==
Click on genes, proteins and metabolites below to link to respective articles. (Note: The interactive pathway map can be edited at WikiPathways: "GlycolysisGluconeogenesis_WP534".)

Glycolysis and Gluconeogenesis edit

== Hibernation and cold adaptation ==
Fructose 1,6-bisphosphatase also plays a key role in hibernation, which requires strict regulation of metabolic processes to facilitate entry into hibernation, maintenance, arousal from hibernation, and adjustments to allow long-term dormancy. During hibernation, an animal's metabolic rate may decrease to around 1/25 of its euthermic resting metabolic rate. FBPase is modified in hibernating animals to be much more temperature sensitive than it is in euthermic animals. FBPase in the liver of a hibernating bat showed a 75% decrease in K_{m} for its substrate FBP at 5 °C than at 37 °C. However, in a euthermic bat this decrease was only 25%, demonstrating the difference in temperature sensitivity between hibernating and euthermic bats. When sensitivity to allosteric inhibitors such as AMP, ADP, inorganic phosphate, and fructose-2,6-bisphosphate were examined, FBPase from hibernating bats was much more sensitive to inhibitors at low temperature than in euthermic bats.

During hibernation, respiration also dramatically decreases, resulting in conditions of relative anoxia in the tissues. Anoxic conditions inhibit gluconeogenesis, and therefore FBPase, while stimulating glycolysis, and this is another reason for reduced FBPase activity in hibernating animals. The substrate of FBPase, fructose 1,6-bisphosphate, has also been shown to activate pyruvate kinase in glycolysis, linking increased glycolysis to decreased gluconeogenesis when FBPase activity is decreased during hibernation.

In addition to hibernation, there is evidence that FBPase activity varies significantly between warm and cold seasons even for animals that do not hibernate. In rabbits exposed to cold temperatures, FBPase activity decreased throughout the duration of cold exposure, increasing when temperatures became warmer again. The mechanism of this FBPase inhibition is thought to be digestion of FBPase by lysosomal proteases, which are released at higher levels during colder periods. Inhibition of FBPase through proteolytic digestion decreases gluconeogenesis relative to glycolysis during cold periods, similar to hibernation.

Fructose 1,6-bisphosphate aldolase is another temperature dependent enzyme that plays an important role in the regulation of glycolysis and gluconeogenesis during hibernation. Its main role is in glycolysis instead of gluconeogenesis, but its substrate is the same as FBPase's, so its activity affects that of FBPase in gluconeogenesis. Aldolase shows similar changes in activity to FBPase at colder temperatures, such as an upward shift in optimum pH at colder temperatures. This adaptation allows enzymes such as FBPase and fructose-1,6-bisphosphate aldolase to track intracellular pH changes in hibernating animals and match their activity ranges to these shifts. Aldolase also complements the activity of FBPase in anoxic conditions (discussed above) by increasing glycolytic output while FBPase inhibition decreases gluconeogenesis activity.

== Diabetes ==
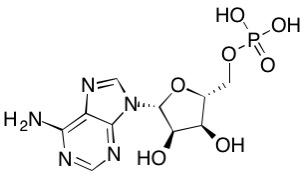
AMP

Fructose 1,6-bisphosphatase is also a key player in treating type 2 diabetes. In this disease, hyperglycemia causes many serious problems, and treatments often focus on lowering blood sugar levels. Gluconeogenesis in the liver is a major cause of glucose overproduction in these patients, and so inhibition of gluconeogenesis is a reasonable way to treat type 2 diabetes. FBPase is a good enzyme to target in the gluconeogenesis pathway because it is rate-limiting and controls the incorporation of all three-carbon substrates into glucose but is not involved in glycogen breakdown and is removed from mitochondrial steps in the pathway. This means that altering its activity can have a large effect on gluconeogenesis while reducing the risk of hypoglycemia and other potential side effects from altering other enzymes in gluconeogenesis.

Drug candidates have been developed that mimic the inhibitory activity of AMP on FBPase. Efforts were made to mimic the allosteric inhibitory effects of AMP while making the drug as structurally different from it as possible. Second-generation FBPase inhibitors have now been developed and have had good results in clinical trials with non-human mammals and now humans.

== See also ==
- Fructose bisphosphatase deficiency
- Fructose
- Gluconeogenesis
- Metabolism
