= Fructose 1,6-bisphosphate =

Names
- IUPAC name 1,6-Di-O-phosphono-β-D-fructofuranose

Identifiers
| CAS Number | 488-69-7 |
| 3D model (JSmol) | Interactive image |
| ChEBI | CHEBI:32966 |
| ChEMBL | ChEMBL1089962 |
| ChemSpider | 9848 |
| ECHA InfoCard | 100.006.985 |
| KEGG | C00354 |
| MeSH | fructose-1,6-diphosphate |
| PubChem CID | 10267 |
| UNII | M7522JYX1H |
| CompTox Dashboard (EPA) | DTXSID0048347 |
- InChI: InChI=1S/C6H14O12P2/c7-4-3(1-16-19(10,11)12)18-6(9,5(4)8ARQDHWQXSA-N; InChI=1/C6H14O12P2/c7-4-3(1-16-19(10,11)12)18-6(9,5(4)8)2-17-20(13,14)15/h3-5,7-9H,1-2H2,(H2,10,11,12)(H2,13,14,15)/t3-,4-,5+,6-/m1/s1 Key: RNBGYGVWRKECFJ-ARQDHWQXSA
- SMILES: C([C@@H]1[C@H]([C@@H]([C@](O1)(COP(=O)(O)O)O)O)O)OP(=O)(O)O

Properties
| Chemical formula | C_{6}H_{14}O_{12}P_{2} |
| Molar mass | 340.116 |

Pharmacology
| ATC code | C01EB07 (WHO) |
- Except where otherwise noted, data are given for materials in their standard state (at 25 °C [77 °F], 100 kPa). verify (what is ?) Infobox references

Fructose 1,6-bisphosphate, known in older publications as Harden-Young ester, is fructose sugar phosphorylated on carbons 1 and 6 (i.e., is a fructosephosphate). The β-D-form of this compound is common in cells. Upon entering the cell, most glucose and fructose is converted to fructose 1,6-bisphosphate.

== In glycolysis ==
Fructose 1,6-bisphosphate lies within the glycolysis metabolic pathway and is produced by phosphorylation of fructose 6-phosphate. It is, in turn, broken down into two compounds: glyceraldehyde 3-phosphate and dihydroxyacetone phosphate. It is an allosteric activator of pyruvate kinase through distinct interactions of binding and allostery at the enzyme's catalytic site

β-D-fructose 6-phosphate (Note: Compound C05345 at KEGG Pathway Database.)
PFK-1 (Note: Enzyme 2.7.1.11 at KEGG Pathway Database.)
ATP
ADP
H_{2}O
P_{i}
FBPase 1 (Note: Enzyme 3.1.3.11 at KEGG Pathway Database.)
β-D-fructose 1,6-bisphosphate (Note: Compound C05378 at KEGG Pathway Database.)
FBA (Note: Fructose-bisphosphate aldolase: Enzyme 4.1.2.13 at KEGG Pathway Database.)
D-glyceraldehyde 3-phosphate (Note: Compound C00111 at KEGG Pathway Database.) (Note: The numbering of the carbon atoms indicates the fate of the carbons according to their position in fructose 6-phosphate.)
+
dihydroxyacetone phosphate (Note: Compound C00118 at KEGG Pathway Database.)

Click on genes, proteins and metabolites below to link to respective articles. (Note: The interactive pathway map can be edited at WikiPathways: "GlycolysisGluconeogenesis_WP534".)

Glycolysis and Gluconeogenesis edit

== Isomerism ==
Fructose 1,6-bisphosphate has only one biologically active isomer, the β-D-form. There are many other isomers, analogous to those of fructose.

== Iron chelation ==
Fructose 1,6-bis(phosphate) has also been implicated in the ability to bind and sequester Fe(II), a soluble form of iron whose oxidation to the insoluble Fe(III) is capable of generating reactive oxygen species via Fenton chemistry. The ability of fructose 1,6-bis(phosphate) to bind Fe(II) may prevent such electron transfers, and thus act as an antioxidant within the body. Certain neurodegenerative diseases, like Alzheimer's and Parkinson's, have been linked to metal deposits with high iron content, although it is uncertain whether Fenton chemistry plays a substantial role in these diseases, or whether fructose 1,6-bis(phosphate) is capable of mitigating those effects.

== See also ==
- Fructose 2,6-bisphosphate
