= Phosphofructokinase =

Enzyme in glycolysis

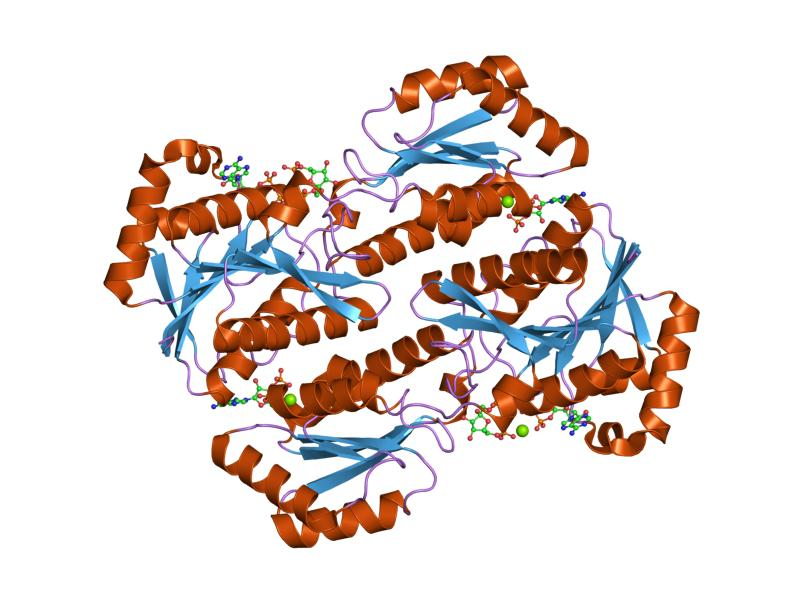

Identifiers
- Symbol: Ppfruckinase
- Pfam: PF00365
- InterPro: IPR000023
- PROSITE: PDOC00336
Available protein structures:
- PDB: PDB: 1kzh PDB: 1mto PDB: 1pfk PDB: 3pfk PDB: 4pfk PDB: 6pfk IPR000023 PF00365 (ECOD; PDBsum)
- AlphaFold: IPR000023; PF00365

Phosphofructokinase (PFK) is a kinase enzyme that phosphorylates fructose 6-phosphate in glycolysis.

== Function ==
The enzyme-catalysed transfer of a phosphoryl group from ATP is an important reaction in a wide variety of biological processes. Phosphofructokinase catalyses the phosphorylation of fructose-6-phosphate to fructose-1,6-bisphosphate, a key regulatory step in the glycolytic pathway. It is allosterically inhibited by ATP and allosterically activated by AMP, thus indicating the cell's energetic needs when it undergoes the glycolytic pathway. PFK exists as a homotetramer in bacteria and mammals (where each monomer possesses 2 similar domains) and as an octomer in yeast (where there are 4 alpha- (PFK1) and 4 beta-chains (PFK2), the latter, like the mammalian monomers, possessing 2 similar domains). This protein may use the morpheein model of allosteric regulation.

PFK is about 300 amino acids in length, and structural studies of the bacterial enzyme have shown it comprises two similar (alpha/beta) lobes: one involved in ATP binding and the other housing both the substrate-binding site and the allosteric site (a regulatory binding site distinct from the active site, but that affects enzyme activity). The identical tetramer subunits adopt 2 different conformations: in a 'closed' state, the bound magnesium ion bridges the phosphoryl groups of the enzyme products (ADP and fructose-1,6-bisphosphate); and in an 'open' state, the magnesium ion binds only the ADP, as the 2 products are now further apart. These conformations are thought to be successive stages of a reaction pathway that requires subunit closure to bring the 2 molecules sufficiently close to react.

The reverse reaction is catalyzed by the enzyme Fructose-1,6-bisphosphatase.

=== Phosphofructokinase family ===
PFK belongs to the phosphofructokinase B (PfkB) family of sugar kinases. Other members of this family (also known as the Ribokinase family) include ribokinase (RK), adenosine kinase (AK), inosine kinase, and 1-phosphofructokinase. The members of the PfkB/RK family are identified by the presence of three conserved sequence motifs. The structures of several PfK family of proteins have been determined from a number of organisms and the enzymatic activity of this family of protein shows a dependence on the presence of pentavalent ions. PFK is found in isoform versions in skeletal muscle (PFKM), in the liver (PFKL), and from platelets (PFKP), allowing for tissue-specific expression and function. It is still speculated that the isoforms may play a role in specific glycolytic rates in the tissue-specific environments they are in. It has been found in humans that some human tumor cell lines had increased glycolytic productivity and correlated with the increased amount of PFKL.

== Clinical significance ==
Deficiency in PFK leads to glycogenosis type VII (Tarui's disease), an autosomal recessive disorder characterised by severe nausea, vomiting, muscle cramps and myoglobinuria in response to bursts of intense or vigorous exercise. Sufferers are usually able to lead a reasonably ordinary life by learning to adjust activity levels.

== Regulation ==
There are two different phosphofructokinase enzymes in humans:

| Type | Synonyms | EC number | Substrate | Product | Paralog genes |
|---|---|---|---|---|---|
| Phosphofructokinase 1 | 6-phosphofructokinase phosphohexokinase | EC 2.7.1.11 | Fructose 6-phosphate | Fructose-1,6-bisphosphate | PFKL, PFKM, PFKP |
| Phosphofructokinase 2 | 6-phosphofructo-2-kinase | EC 2.7.1.105 | Fructose 6-phosphate | Fructose-2,6-bisphosphate | PFKFB1, PFKFB2, PFKFB3, PFKFB4 |

== See also ==
- Phosphofructokinase deficiency (GSD type VII, Tarui's disease)
