= Phosphofructokinase 2 =

Class of enzymes

6-phosphofructo-2-kinase
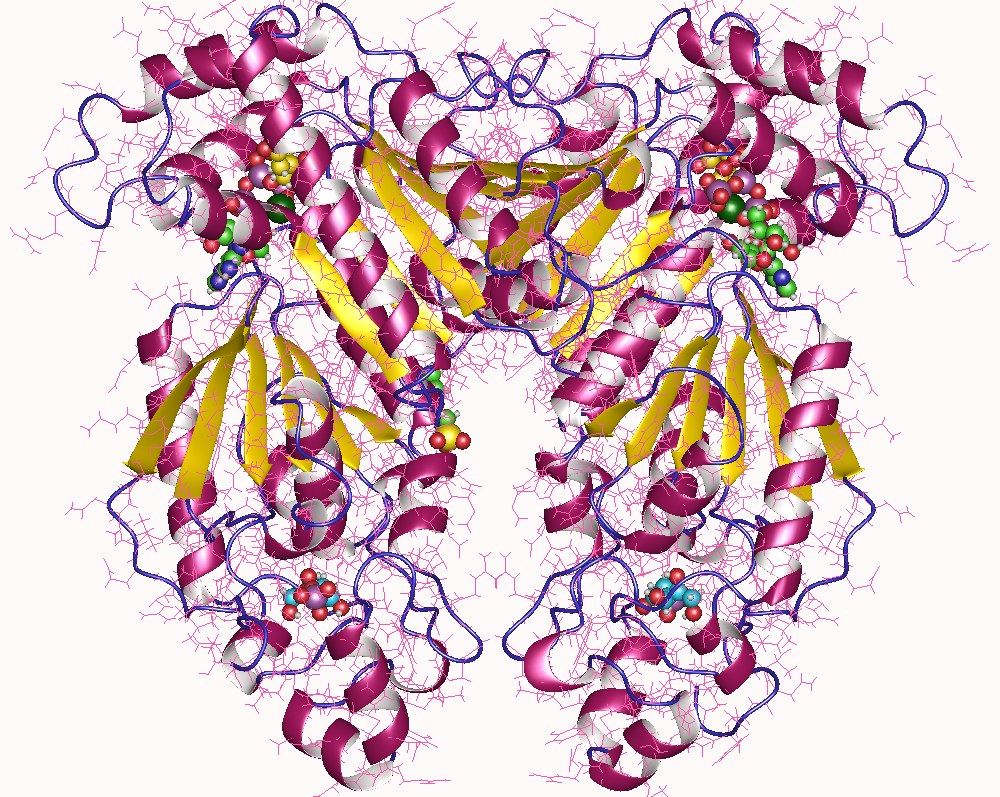
- 6-phosphofructo-2-kinase dimer, Human heart

Identifiers
- EC no.: 2.7.1.105
- CAS no.: 78689-77-7

Databases
- BRENDA: enzyme data
- ExPASy: NiceZyme view
- KEGG: enzyme entry
- MetaCyc: metabolic pathway
- Rhea: reactions
- PDB structures: RCSB PDB PDBe PDBsum
- Gene Ontology: AmiGO / QuickGO
Search
- PMC: articles
- PubMed: articles
- NCBI: proteins

6PF2K
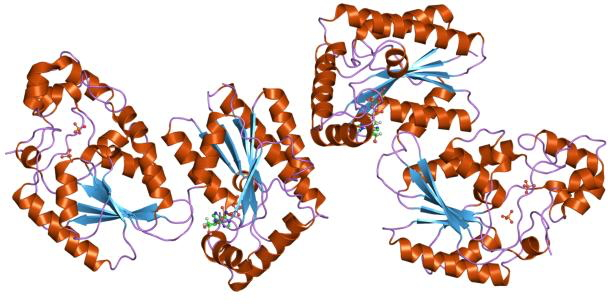
- crystal structure of human liver 6-phosphofructo-2-kinase/fructose-2,6-bisphosphatase

Identifiers
- Symbol: 6PF2K
- Pfam: PF01591k
- Pfam clan: CL0023
- InterPro: IPR013079
- PROSITE: PDOC00158
- SCOP2: 1bif / SCOPe / SUPFAM
Available protein structures:
- PDB: IPR013079 PF01591k (ECOD; PDBsum)
- AlphaFold: IPR013079; PF01591k

6-phosphofructo-2-kinase/fructose-bisphosphatase-2
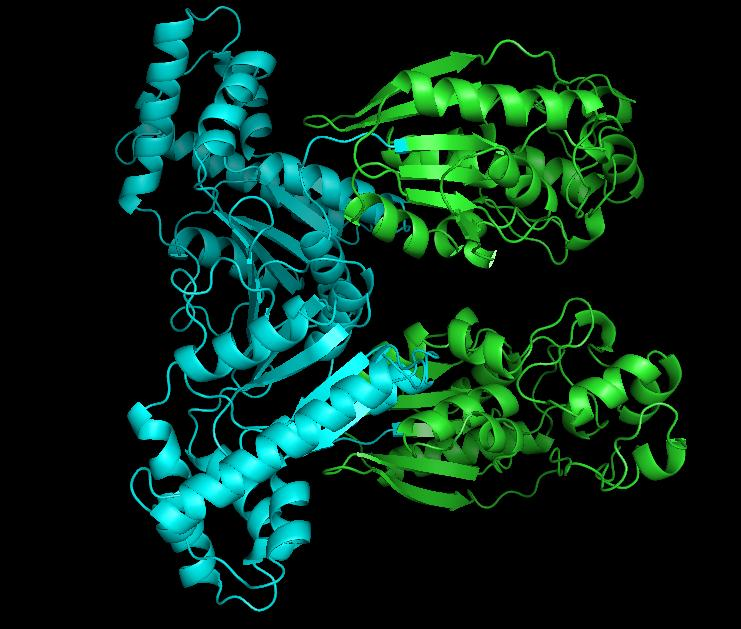
- Structure of PFK2. Shown: kinase domain (cyan) and the phosphatase domain (green).

Identifiers
- Symbol: 6PF2K
- Pfam: PF01591
- InterPro: IPR013079
- PROSITE: PDOC00158
- SCOP2: 1bif / SCOPe / SUPFAM
Available protein structures:
- PDB: 2axn A:24-246; 1k6m B:40-251; 2bif A:30-249; 3bif A:30-249; 1bif :37-249 IPR013079 PF01591 (ECOD; PDBsum)
- AlphaFold: IPR013079; PF01591

fructose-bisphosphatase-2

Identifiers
- Symbol: FBPase-2
- Pfam: PF00316
- InterPro: IPR028343
- PROSITE: PDOC00114
Available protein structures:
- PDB: IPR028343 PF00316 (ECOD; PDBsum)
- AlphaFold: IPR028343; PF00316

Phosphofructokinase-2 (6-phosphofructo-2-kinase, PFK-2) or fructose bisphosphatase-2 (FBPase-2), is an enzyme indirectly responsible for regulating the rates of glycolysis and gluconeogenesis in cells. It catalyzes formation and degradation of a significant allosteric regulator, fructose-2,6-bisphosphate (Fru-2,6-P_{2}) from substrate fructose-6-phosphate. Fru-2,6-P_{2} contributes to the rate-determining step of glycolysis as it activates enzyme phosphofructokinase 1 in the glycolysis pathway, and inhibits fructose-1,6-bisphosphatase 1 in gluconeogenesis. Since Fru-2,6-P_{2} differentially regulates glycolysis and gluconeogenesis, it can act as a key signal to switch between the opposing pathways. Because PFK-2 produces Fru-2,6-P_{2} in response to hormonal signaling, metabolism can be more sensitively and efficiently controlled to align with the organism's glycolytic needs. This enzyme participates in fructose and mannose metabolism. The enzyme is important in the regulation of hepatic carbohydrate metabolism and is found in greatest quantities in the liver, kidney and heart. In mammals, several genes often encode different isoforms, each of which differs in its tissue distribution and enzymatic activity. The family described here bears a resemblance to the ATP-driven phospho-fructokinases; however, they share little sequence similarity, although a few residues seem key to their interaction with fructose 6-phosphate.

PFK-2 is known as the "bifunctional enzyme" because of its notable structure: though both are located on one protein homodimer, its two domains act as independently functioning enzymes. One terminus serves as a kinase domain (for PFK-2) while the other terminus acts as a phosphatase domain (FBPase-2).

In mammals, genetic mechanisms encode different PFK-2 isoforms to accommodate tissue specific needs. While general function remains the same, isoforms feature slight differences in enzymatic properties and are controlled by different methods of regulation; these differences are discussed below.

== Structure ==
The monomers of the bifunctional protein are clearly divided into two functional domains. The kinase domain is located on the N-terminal. It consists of a central six-stranded β sheet, with five parallel strands and an antiparallel edge strand, surrounded by seven α helices. The domain contains nucleotide-binding fold (nbf) at the C-terminal end of the first β-strand. The PFK-2 domain appears to be closely related to the superfamily of mononucleotide binding proteins including adenylate cyclase.

On the other hand, the phosphatase domain is located on the C-terminal. It resembles the family of proteins that include phosphoglycerate mutases and acid phosphatases. The domain has a mixed α/ β structure, with a six-stranded central β sheet, plus an additional α-helical subdomain that covers the presumed active site of the molecule. Finally, the N-terminal region modulates PFK-2 and FBPase2 activities, and stabilizes the dimer form of the enzyme.

While this central catalytic core remains conserved in all forms of PFK-2, slight structural variations exist in isoforms as a result of different amino acid sequences or alternative splicing. With some minor exceptions, the size of PFK-2 enzymes is typically around 55 kDa.

Researchers hypothesize that the unique bifunctional structure of this enzyme arose from a gene fusion event between a primordial bacterial PFK-1 and a primordial mutase/phosphatase.

== Function ==
This enzyme's main function is to synthesize or degrade allosteric regulator Fru-2,6-P_{2} in response to glycolytic needs of the cell or organism, as depicted in the accompanying diagram.

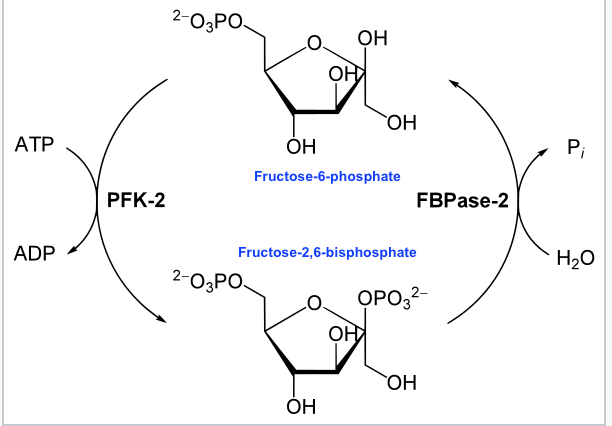
PFK-2 and FBPase-2 Reaction

In enzymology, a 6-phosphofructo-2-kinase (EC 2.7.1.105) is an enzyme that catalyzes the chemical reaction:

ATP + beta-D-fructose 6-phosphate $\rightleftharpoons$ ADP + beta-D-fructose 2,6-bisphosphate

Thus, the kinase domain hydrolyzes ATP to phosphorylate the carbon-2 of fructose-6-phosphate, producing Fru-2,6-P_{2} and ADP_{.} A phosphohistidine intermediate is formed within the reaction.

At the other terminal, the fructose-2,6-bisphosphate 2-phosphatase (EC 3.1.3.46) domain dephosphorylates Fru-2,6-P_{2} with the addition of water. This opposing chemical reaction is:
beta-D-fructose 2,6-bisphosphate + H_{2}O $\rightleftharpoons$ D-fructose 6-phosphate + phosphate

Because of the enzyme's dual functions, it can be categorized into multiple families. Through categorization by the kinase reaction, this enzyme belongs to the family of transferases, specifically those transferring phosphorus-containing groups (phosphotransferases) with an alcohol group as acceptor. On the other hand, the phosphatase reaction is characteristic of the family of hydrolases, specifically those acting on phosphoric monoester bonds.

== Regulation ==
In almost all isoforms, PFK-2 undergoes covalent modification through phosphorylation/dephosphorylation based on the cell's hormonal signaling. Phosphorylation of a specific residue may prompt a shift that stabilizes either kinase or phosphatase domain function. This regulation signal thus controls whether F-2,6-P_{2} will be synthesized or degraded.

Furthermore, the allosteric regulation of PFK2 is very similar to the regulation of PFK1. High levels of AMP or phosphate group signifies a low energy charge state and thus stimulates PFK2. On the other hand, a high concentration of phosphoenolpyruvate (PEP) and citrate signifies that there is a high level of biosynthetic precursor and hence inhibits PFK2. Unlike PFK1, PFK2 is not affected by ATP concentration.

== Isozymes ==
Protein isozymes are enzymes that catalyze the same reaction but are encoded with different amino acid sequences and as such, display slight differences in protein characteristics. In humans, the four genes that encode phosphofructokinase 2 proteins include PFKFB-1, PFKFB2, PFKFB3 and PFKFB4.

Multiple mammalian isoforms of the protein have been reported to date, difference rising by either the transcription of different enzymes or alternative splicing. While the structural core that catalyzes the PFK-2/FBPase-2 reaction is highly conserved across isoforms, the major differences arise from highly variable flanking sequences in the isoform amino and carboxyl terminals. Because these areas often contain phosphorylation sites, changes in amino acid composition or terminal length may result in vastly different enzyme kinetics and characteristics. Each variant differs in their primary tissue of expression, response to protein kinase regulation, and ratio of kinase/phosphatase domain activity. While multiple types of isozymes may consist in a tissue, isozymes are identified by their primary tissue expression and tissue of discovery below.

=== PFKB1: liver, muscle, and fetal ===
6-phosphofructo-2-kinase: PFKB1
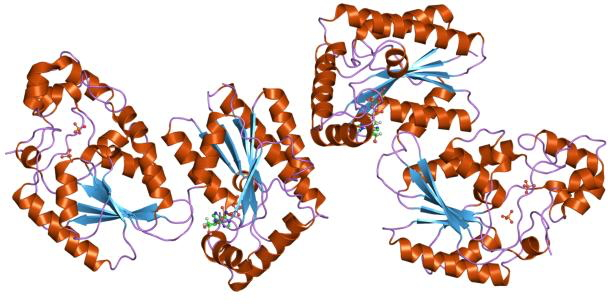
- Crystal structure of human liver 6-phosphofructo-2-kinase/fructose-2,6-bisphosphatase

Identifiers
- EC no.: 2.7.1.105
- CAS no.: 78689-77-7

Databases
- BRENDA: enzyme data
- ExPASy: NiceZyme view
- KEGG: enzyme entry
- MetaCyc: metabolic pathway
- Rhea: reactions
- PDB structures: RCSB PDB PDBe PDBsum
- Gene Ontology: AmiGO / QuickGO
Search
- PMC: articles
- PubMed: articles
- NCBI: proteins

Located on the X chromosome, this gene is the most well-known of the four genes particularly because it encodes the highly researched liver enzyme. Variable mRNA splicing of PFKB1 yields three different promoters (L, M and F) and therefore, three tissue-specific variants that differ in regulation:

- L-Type: liver tissue
  - Insulin activates liver PFK-2 function to indicate a high abundance of blood glucose is available for glycolysis. Insulin activates a protein phosphatase which dephosphorylates the PFK-2 complex and causes favored PFK-2 activity. PFK-2 then increases production of F-2,6-P_{2.} As this product allosterically activates PFK-1, it activates glycolysis and inhibits gluconeogenesis.
  - In contrast, glucagon increases FBPase-2 activity. At low blood glucose concentrations, glucagon triggers a cAMP signal cascade and in turn, Protein Kinase A (PKA) phosphorylates Serine 32 near the N-terminus. This inactivates the bifunctional enzyme's ability to act as a kinase and stabilizes the phosphatase activity. Therefore, glucagon decreases concentrations of F-2,6-P_{2,} slows rates of glycolysis, and stimulates the gluconeogenesis pathway.

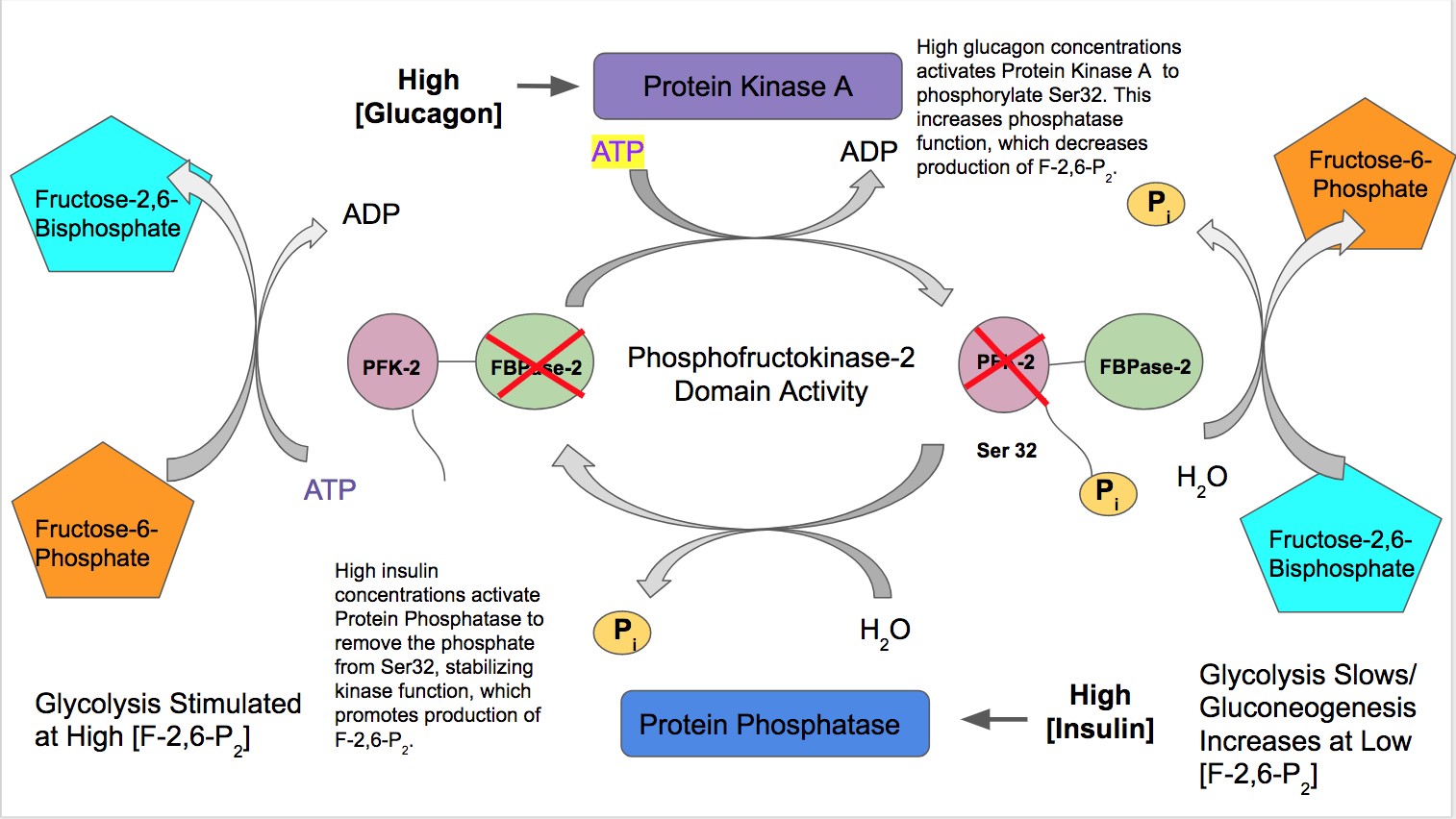
Liver-Tissue PFK-2 Regulation: Concentrations of hormones glucagon and insulin activate proteins which change phosphorylation state of PFK-2. Depending on which domain is stabilized, PFK-2 will synthesize or degrade fructose-2,6-bisphosphate, which impacts rates of glycolysis.

- M-Type: skeletal muscle tissue; F-Type: fibroblast and fetal tissue
  - In contrast to most other PFK-2 tissues, PFK-2 in both skeletal muscle and fetal tissue is solely regulated by concentrations of Fructose-6-phosphate. Within their first exon, there are no regulatory sites that require phosphorylation/dephosphorylation to provoke a change in function. High concentrations of F-6-P will activate kinase function and increase rates of glycolysis, whereas low concentrations of F-6-P will stabilize phosphatase action.

6-phosphofructo-2-kinase:PFKB2
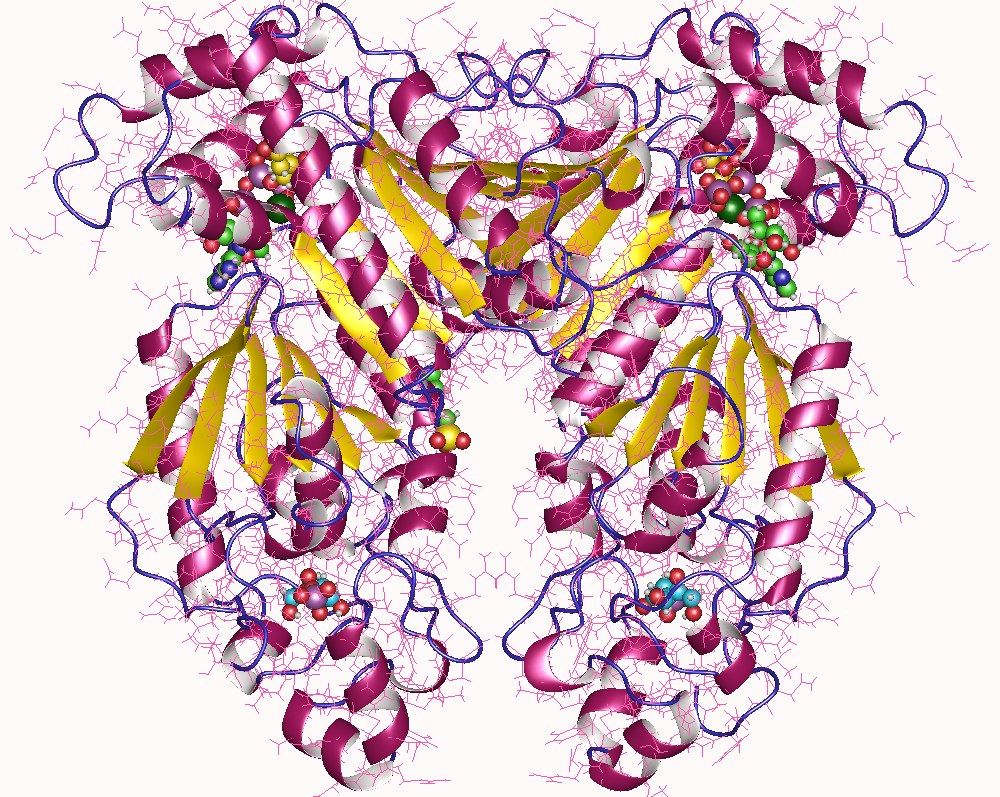
- 6-phosphofructo-2-kinase dimer, Human heart tissue

Identifiers
- EC no.: 2.7.1.105
- CAS no.: 78689-77-7

Databases
- BRENDA: enzyme data
- ExPASy: NiceZyme view
- KEGG: enzyme entry
- MetaCyc: metabolic pathway
- Rhea: reactions
- PDB structures: RCSB PDB PDBe PDBsum
- Gene Ontology: AmiGO / QuickGO
Search
- PMC: articles
- PubMed: articles
- NCBI: proteins

=== PFKB2: cardiac (H-Type) ===
The PFKB2 gene is located on chromosome 1. When greater concentrations of adrenaline and/or insulin hormone are circulated, a Protein Kinase A pathway is activated which phosphorylates either Serine 466 or Serine 483 in the C-terminus. Alternatively, Protein Kinase B may also phosphorylate these regulatory sites, which are part of the FBPase-2 domain. When this serine residue is phosphorylated, FBPase-2 function is inactivated and greater PFK-2 activity is stabilized.

=== PFKB3: brain, placental, and inducible ===
PFKB3 is located on chromosome 10 and transcribes two major isoforms, inducible type and ubiquitous type. These forms differ in alternative splicing of Exon 15 in their C-terminus. However, they are similar in that for both, glucagon activates a cyclic AMP pathway; this results in Protein Kinase A, Protein Kinase C, or AMP-activated Protein Kinase phosphorylating a regulatory residue on Serine 461 in the C-terminus to stabilize PFK-2 kinase function. Furthermore, both isoforms transcribed from this gene are noted for having a particularly high, dominant rate of kinase activity as indicated by a kinase/phosphatase activity ratio of 700 (whereas the liver, heart, and testis isozymes respectively have PFK-2/FBPase-2 ratios of 1.5, 80, and 4). Therefore, PFKB3 in particular consistently produces large amounts of F-2,6-P_{2} and sustains high rates of glycolysis.

- I-Type: Inducible
  - This isoform's name is a result of its increased expression in response to hypoxic stress; its formation is induced by lack of oxygen. This type is highly expressed in rapidly proliferating cells, especially tumor cells.
- U-Type: Ubiquitous; also known as placental or brain
  - Though discovered separately in the placental, pancreatic-β-islet, or brain tissues, the various isoforms appear identical. The tissues it was discovered in all require great energy to function, which may explain PFKB3's advantage of such high kinase-phosphatase activity ratio.
  - The brain isoform in particular has lengthy N- and C-terminus regions such that this type is almost twice as large as the typical PFK-2, at around 110 kDa.

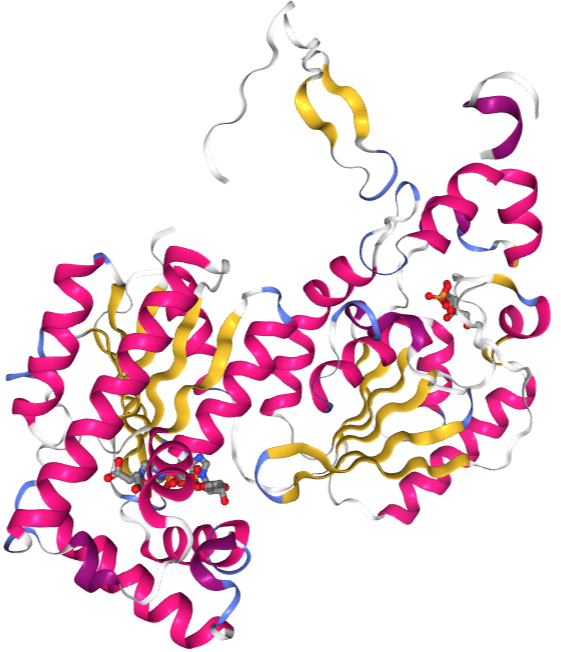
i-PFKB3, Human inducible form

=== PFKB4: testis (T-Type) ===
Gene PFKB4, located on chromosome 3, expresses PFK-2 in human testis tissue. PFK-2 enzymes encoded by PFK-4 are comparable to the liver enzyme in size at around 54kDa, and like the muscle tissue, do not contain a protein kinase phosphorylation site. While less research has clarified regulation mechanisms for this isoform, studies have confirmed that modification from multiple transcription factors in the 5' flanking region regulates the amount of PFK-2 expression in developing testis tissue. This isoform has been particularly implicated as being modified and hyper-expressed for prostate cancer cell survival.

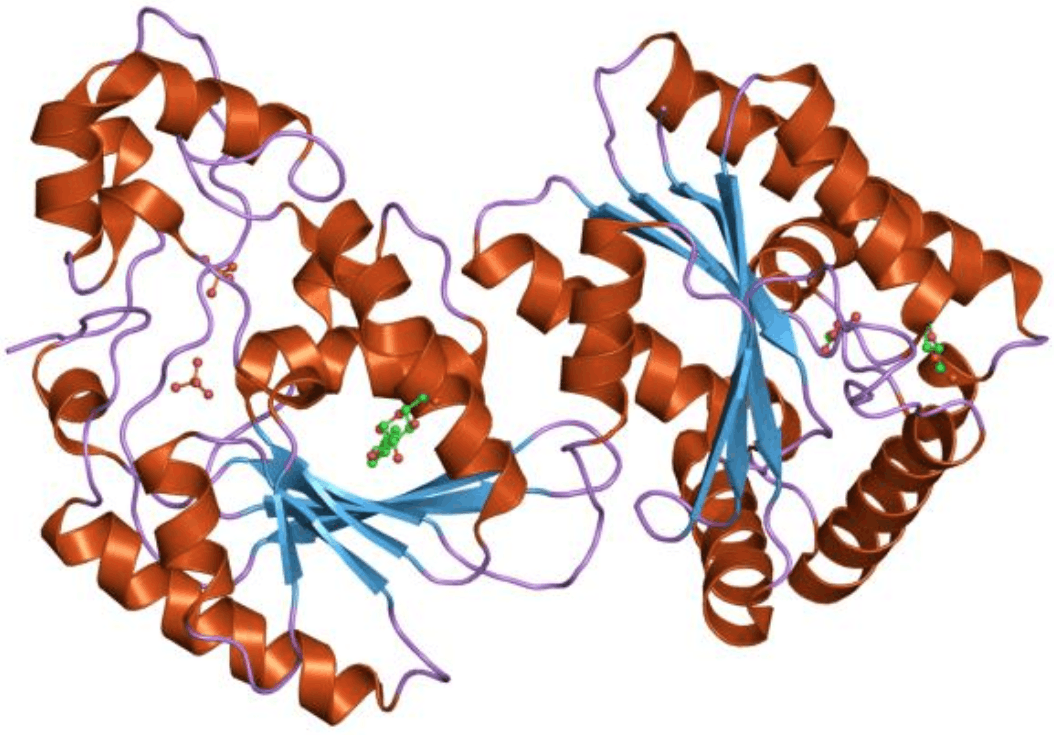
6-phosphofructo-2-kinase structure, testis tissue

== Clinical significance ==
Because this enzyme family maintains rates of glycolysis and gluconeogenesis, it presents great potential for therapeutic action for control of metabolism particularly in diabetes and cancer cells. Data also demonstrates that all of the PFK-2 genes (although the PFKB3 gene response remains the most drastic) were activated by limitations in oxygen. The control of PFK-2/FBP-ase2 activity was found to be linked to heart functioning, particularly for ischemia, and the control against hypoxia. Researchers hypothesize that this responsive characteristic of the PFK-2 genes may be a strong, evolutionary physiological adaptation. However, many human cancer cell types (including leukemia, lung, breast, colon, pancreatic, and ovarian cancers) demonstrate over-expression of PFK3 and/or PFK4; this change in metabolism likely plays a role in the Warburg effect.

Lastly, the Pfkfb2 gene encoding PFK2/FBPase2 protein is linked to the predisposition to schizophrenia.
