= Seiichirō =

- Gender: Male

Origin
- Origin: Japanese
- Meaning: Different meanings depending on the kanji used

Seiichirō, Seiichiro, Seiichirou or Seiichiroh (written: 誠一郎, 清一朗 or 征一郎) is a masculine Japanese given name. Notable people with the name include:

- Seiichiro Kashio (柏尾 誠一郎; 1892–1962), Japanese tennis player
- Seiichiro Kubo (久保 征一郎; born 2001), Japanese footballer
- Seiichiro Maki (巻 誠一郎; born 1980), Japanese footballer
- Seiichiro Murakami (村上 誠一郎; born 1952), Japanese politician
- Seiichiro Nakagawa (中川 誠一郎; born 1979), Japanese cyclist
- Seiichiro Okuno (奥野 誠一郎; born 1974), Japanese footballer
- Seiichiro Sasaki (佐々木 精一郎; born 1945), Japanese long distance runner
- Seiichiro Shimizu (清水 清一朗; born 1947), Japanese politician
- Seiichiro Tarui (垂井 清一郎; born 1927), Japanese physician
- Seiichiro Yamashita (山下誠一郎; born 1992), Japanese voice actor
- Seiichiro Yasui (安井 誠一郎; 1891–1962), Japanese politician.
