= Phosphofructokinase deficiency =

- Other names: Glycogen storage disease type VII or Tarui's disease
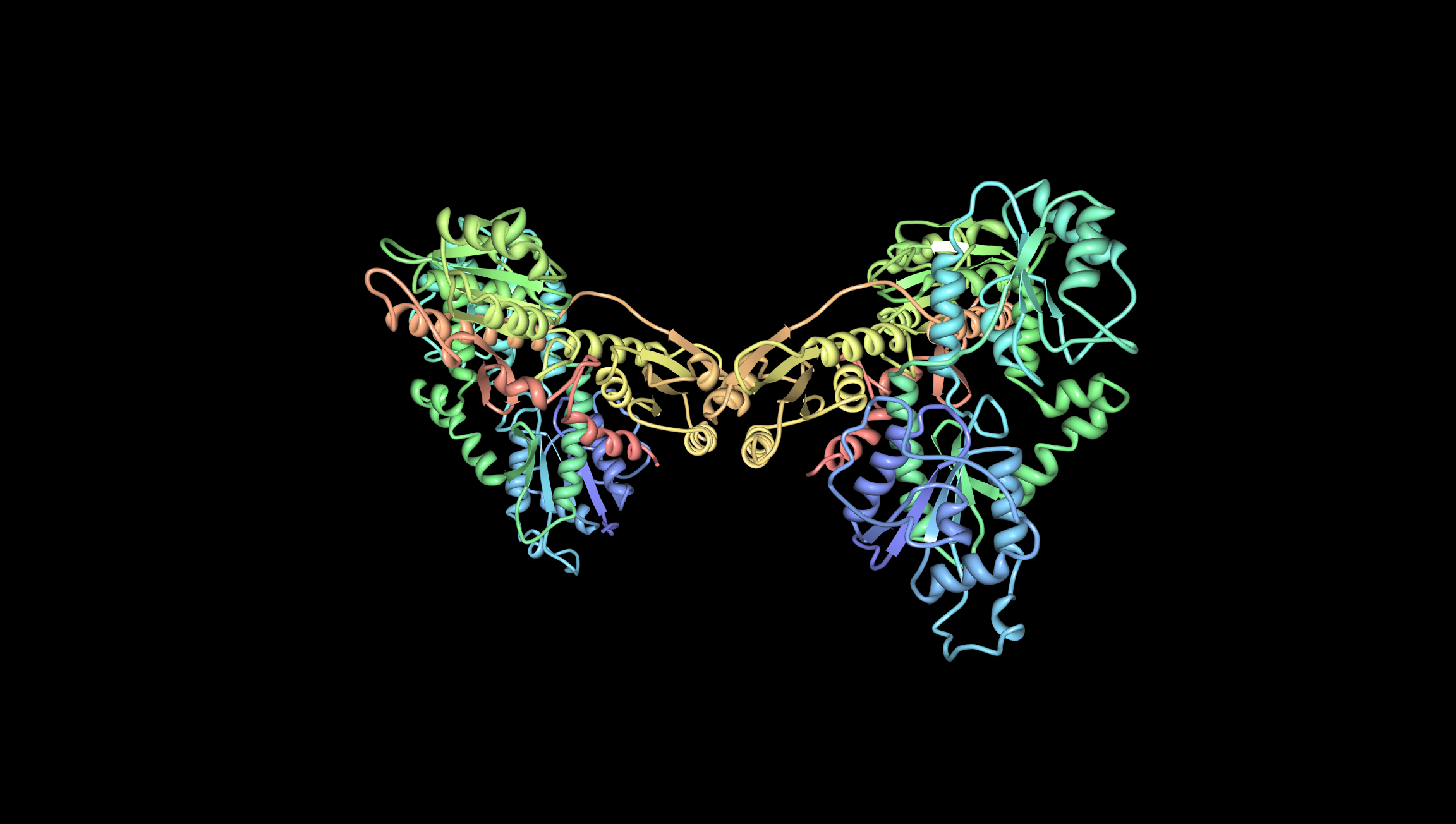
- A rendering of the human muscular form of phosphofructokinase. Mutations in the production of this enzyme are the cause of Tarui's disease. The symmetry of the enzyme is a result of its tetrameric structure.
- Specialty: Endocrinology
- Symptoms: Muscle pain, exercise intolerance, hemolytic anemia
- Frequency: 0.0001%

Phosphofructokinase deficiency is a rare muscular metabolic disorder, with an autosomal recessive inheritance pattern. It is characterized as a deficiency in the Phosphofructokinase (PFK) enzyme throughout the body, including the skeletal muscles and red blood cells. Phosphofructokinase is an enzyme involved in the glycolytic process. The lack of PFK blocks the completion of the glycolytic pathway. Therefore, all products past the block would be deficient, including Adenosine triphosphate (ATP).

It may affect humans as well as other mammals (especially dogs). It was named after the Japanese physician Seiichiro Tarui (b. 1927), who first observed the condition in 1965.

== Presentation ==
=== In humans ===
Human PFK deficiency is categorized into four types: classic, late-onset, infantile and hemolytic. These types are differentiated by age at which symptoms are observed and which symptoms present.

==== Classic form ====
Classic phosphofructokinase deficiency is the most common type of this disorder. This type presents with exercise-induced muscle cramps and weakness (sometimes rhabdomyolysis), myoglobinuria, as well as with haemolytic anaemia causing dark urine a few hours later. Hyperuricemia is common, due to the kidneys' inability to process uric acid following damage resulting from processing myoglobin. Nausea and vomiting following strenuous exercise is another common indicator of classic PFK deficiency. Many patients will also display high levels of bilirubin, which can lead to a jaundiced appearance. Symptoms for this type of PFK deficiency usually appear in early childhood.

==== Late-onset form ====
Late-onset PFK deficiency, as the name suggests, is a form of the disease that presents later in life. Common symptoms associated with late-onset phosphofructokinase deficiency are myopathy, weakness and fatigue. Many of the more severe symptoms found in the classic type of this disease are absent in the late-onset form.

==== Infantile form ====
Phosphofructokinase deficiency also presents in a rare infantile form. Infants with this deficiency often display floppy infant syndrome (hypotonia), arthrogryposis, encephalopathy and cardiomyopathy. The disorder can also manifest itself in the central nervous system, usually in the form of seizures. PFK deficient infants also often have some type of respiratory issue. Survival rate for the infantile form of PFK deficiency is low, and the cause of death is often due to respiratory failure.

==== Hemolytic form ====
The defining characteristic of this form of the disorder is hemolytic anemia, in which red blood cells break down prematurely. Muscle weakness and pain are not as common in patients with hemolytic PFK deficiency.

=== In dogs ===
Presentation of the canine form of the disease is similar to that of the human form. Most notably, PFK deficient dogs have mild, but persistent, anemia with hemolytic episodes, exercise intolerance, hemoglobinuria, and pale or jaundiced mucous membranes. Muscle weakness and cramping are not uncommon symptoms, but they are not as common as they are in human PFKM deficiency.

== Risk factors ==
=== In humans ===
In order to get Tarui's disease, both parents must be carriers of the genetic defect so that the child is born with the full form of the recessive trait. The best indicator of risk is a family member with PFK deficiency.

=== In dogs ===
Canine phosphofructokinase deficiency is found mostly in English Springer Spaniels and American Cocker Spaniels, but has also been reported in Whippets and Wachtelhunds. Mixed-breed dogs descended from any of these breeds are also at risk to inherit PFK deficiency.

== Pathophysiology ==
Phosphofructokinase is a tetrameric enzyme that consists of three types of subunits: PFKL (liver), PFKM (muscle), and PFKP (platelet). The combination of these subunits varies depending on the tissue in question. In this condition, a deficiency of the M subunit (PFKM) of the phosphofructokinase enzyme impairs the ability of cells such as erythrocytes and rhabdomyocytes (skeletal muscle cells) to use carbohydrates (such as glucose) for energy. Unlike most other glycogen storage diseases, it directly affects glycolysis. The mutation impairs the ability of phosphofructokinase to phosphorylate fructose-6-phosphate prior to its cleavage into glyceraldehyde-3-phosphate which is the rate limiting step in the glycolysis pathway. Inhibition of this step prevents the formation of adenosine triphosphate (ATP) from adenosine diphosphate (ADP), which results in a lack of available energy for muscles during heavy exercise. This results in the muscle cramping and pain that are common symptoms of the disease.

=== In humans ===
Genetic mutation is the cause of phosphofructokinase deficiency. Several different mutations in the gene that encodes for PFKM have been reported in humans, but the result is production of PFKM subunits with little to no function. As a result, affected individuals display only about 50–65% of total normal phosphofructokinase enzyme function.

=== In dogs ===
PFK deficiency is believed to be the result of a nonsense mutation in the gene that encodes for PFKM. This results in an unstable, truncated protein that lacks normal function. This results in a near complete loss of PFKM activity in the skeletal muscle. Dogs with the mutation display 10–20% of normal PFK activity in their erythrocytes, due to a higher proportion of PFKM in those cells.

== Diagnosis ==
Symptoms of phosphofructokinase deficiency can closely resemble those of other metabolic diseases, include deficiencies of phosphoglycerate kinase, phosphoglycerate mutase, lactate dehydrogenase, beta-enolase and aldolase A. Thus, proper diagnosis is important to determine a treatment plan.

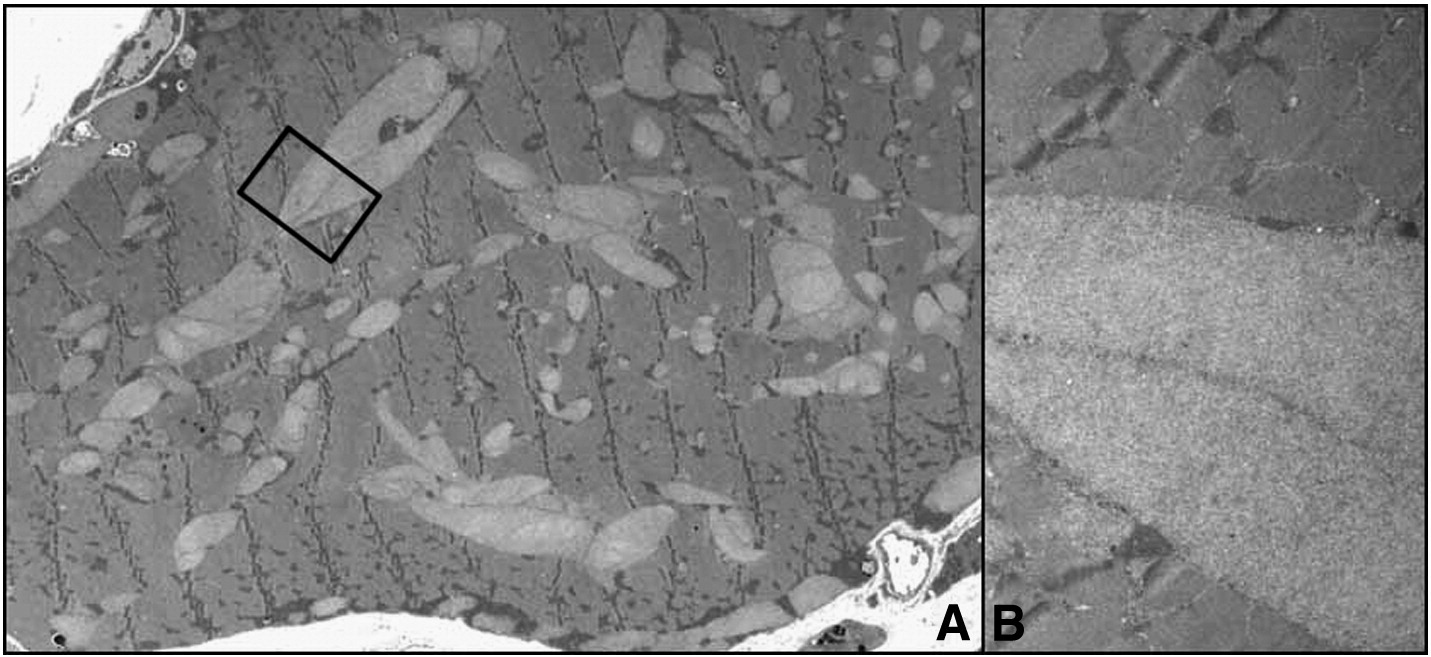
Glycogen deposits in the muscle of a human patient, shown by electron microscopy. The presence of this excess glycogen in muscle tissue is a result of phosphofructokinase deficiency.

A diagnosis can be made through a muscle biopsy that shows excess glycogen accumulation. Glycogen deposits in the muscle are a result of the interruption of normal glucose breakdown that regulates the breakdown of glycogen. Blood tests are conducted to measure the activity of phosphofructokinase, which would be lower in a patient with this condition. Patients also commonly display elevated levels of creatine kinase.

== Management ==
Treatment usually entails that the patient refrain from strenuous exercise to prevent muscle pain and cramping. Avoiding carbohydrates is also recommended.

A ketogenic diet also improved the symptoms of an infant with PFK deficiency. The logic behind this treatment is that the low-carb high fat diet forces the body to use fatty acids as a primary energy source instead of glucose. This bypasses the enzymatic defect in glycolysis, lessening the impact of the mutated PFKM enzymes. This has not been widely studied enough to prove if it is a viable treatment, but testing is continuing to explore this option.

Genetic testing to determine whether or not a person is a carrier of the mutated gene is also available.

== In dogs ==
Diagnosis of canine phosphofructokinase deficiency is similar to the blood tests used in diagnosis of humans. Blood tests measuring the total erythrocyte PFK activity are used for definitive diagnosis in most cases. DNA testing for presence of the condition is also available.

Treatment mostly takes the form of supportive care. Owners are advised to keep their dogs out of stressful or exciting situations, avoid high temperature environments and strenuous exercise. It is also important for the owner to be alert for any signs of a hemolytic episode. Dogs carrying the mutated form of the gene should be removed from the breeding population, in order to reduce incidence of the condition.
