= Fructose bisphosphatase =

Fructose bisphosphatase may refer to:

- Fructose 1,6-bisphosphatase (when the term "Fructose bisphosphatase" is used without qualification, this is more frequently what is meant)
- Fructose 2,6-bisphosphatase
