= CRTC2 =

Protein found in humans

Identifiers
- Aliases: CRTC2, TORC-2, TORC2, CREB regulated transcription coactivator 2
- External IDs: OMIM: 608972; MGI: 1921593; GeneCards: CRTC2
Available structures
PDB	Ortholog search: PDBe RCSB
PDB	List of PDB id codes 4HTM

Gene location (Human)
Chr.	Chromosome 1 (human)
Band	1q21.3	Start	153,947,669 bp
Band	1q21.3	End	153,958,615 bp

Gene location (Mouse)
Chr.	Chromosome 3 (mouse)
Band	3|3 F1	Start	90,161,470 bp
Band	3|3 F1	End	90,171,432 bp
RNA expression pattern
Bgee	Human / Mouse (ortholog); Top expressed in: granulocyte; left ovary; right ovary; right hemisphere of cerebellum; right lung; spleen; right lobe of thyroid gland; left lobe of thyroid gland; canal of the cervix; body of uterus / Top expressed in: neural layer of retina; lumbar spinal ganglion; tail of embryo; genital tubercle; granulocyte; lip; muscle of thigh; cerebellar cortex; thymus; superior frontal gyrus; More reference expression data
BioGPS	n/a
Gene ontology
Molecular function	chromatin binding; protein binding; cAMP response element binding protein binding
Cellular component	cytoplasm; extracellular exosome; nucleus; nucleoplasm
Biological process	gluconeogenesis; histone H3-K9 acetylation; positive regulation of CREB transcription factor activity; viral process; regulation of transcription, DNA-templated; protein homotetramerization; toxin transport; glucose homeostasis; transcription, DNA-templated; positive regulation of transcription by RNA polymerase II
Sources:Amigo / QuickGO
Orthologs
Databases	NCBI: entry; OMA: entry
Species	Human	Mouse
Entrez	200186	74343
Ensembl	ENSG00000160741	ENSMUSG00000027936
UniProt	Q53ET0	Q3U182
RefSeq (mRNA)	NM_181715	NM_028881; NM_001357152
RefSeq (protein)	NP_859066	NP_083157; NP_001344081
Location (UCSC)	Chr 1: 153.95 – 153.96 Mb	Chr 3: 90.16 – 90.17 Mb
PubMed search
- Wikidata
View/Edit Human	View/Edit Mouse

CREB regulated transcription coactivator 2, also known as CRTC2, is a protein which in humans is encoded by the CRTC2 gene.

== Function ==
CRTC2, initially called TORC2, is a transcriptional coactivator for the transcription factor CREB and a central regulator of gluconeogenic gene expression in response to cAMP. CRTC2 is thought to drive tumorigenesis in STK11(LKB1)-null non-small cell lung cancers (NSCLC).

== Interactions ==
CRTC2 has been shown to interact with SNF1LK2 and YWHAQ.
