= ATP6V0A4 =

Protein-coding gene in the species Homo sapiens

Identifiers
- Aliases: ATP6V0A4, A4, ATP6N1B, ATP6N2, RDRTA2, RTA1C, RTADR, STV1, VPH1, VPP2, ATPase H+ transporting V0 subunit a4, DRTA3
- External IDs: OMIM: 605239; MGI: 2153480; GeneCards: ATP6V0A4

Gene location (Human)
Chr.	Chromosome 7 (human)
Band	7q34	Start	138,706,294 bp
Band	7q34	End	138,799,560 bp

Gene location (Mouse)
Chr.	Chromosome 6 (mouse)
Band	6|6 B1	Start	38,025,418 bp
Band	6|6 B1	End	38,101,521 bp
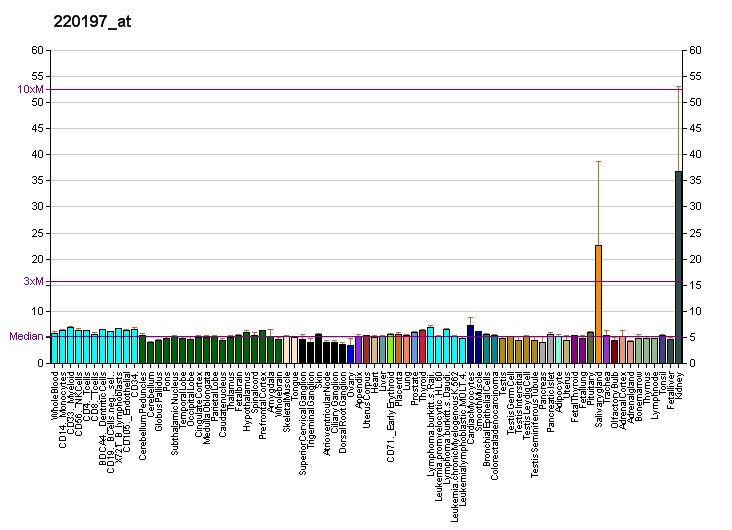
RNA expression pattern
Bgee	Human / Mouse (ortholog); Top expressed in: renal medulla; human kidney; olfactory zone of nasal mucosa; kidney tubule; testicle; parotid gland; gonad; skin of leg; cartilage tissue; skin of abdomen / Top expressed in: right kidney; lip; human kidney; morula; zygote; proximal tubule; blastocyst; esophagus; embryo; yolk sac; More reference expression data
BioGPS	More reference expression data
Gene ontology
Molecular function	ATPase binding; proton-transporting ATPase activity, rotational mechanism; protein binding; proton transmembrane transporter activity
Cellular component	integral component of membrane; endosome; proton-transporting V-type ATPase, V0 domain; phagocytic vesicle membrane; membrane; vacuolar proton-transporting V-type ATPase, V0 domain; plasma membrane; apical part of cell; brush border membrane; lysosomal membrane; apical plasma membrane; brush border; vacuolar proton-transporting V-type ATPase complex; endosome membrane; extracellular exosome
Biological process	insulin receptor signaling pathway; excretion; transferrin transport; ossification; vacuolar proton-transporting V-type ATPase complex assembly; ion transport; hearing; vacuolar acidification; ion transmembrane transport; ATP synthesis coupled proton transport; regulation of pH; phagosome acidification; transport; proton transmembrane transport
Sources:Amigo / QuickGO
Orthologs
Databases	NCBI: entry; OMA: entry
Species	Human	Mouse
Entrez	50617	140494
Ensembl	ENSG00000105929	ENSMUSG00000038600
UniProt	Q9HBG4	Q920R6
RefSeq (mRNA)	NM_020632; NM_130840; NM_130841	NM_080467
RefSeq (protein)	NP_065683; NP_570855; NP_570856	NP_536715
Location (UCSC)	Chr 7: 138.71 – 138.8 Mb	Chr 6: 38.03 – 38.1 Mb
PubMed search
- Wikidata
View/Edit Human	View/Edit Mouse

V-type proton ATPase 116 kDa subunit a isoform 4 is an enzyme that in humans is encoded by the ATP6V0A4 gene.

== Function ==
This gene encodes a component of vacuolar ATPase (V-ATPase), a multisubunit enzyme that mediates acidification of intracellular compartments of eukaryotic cells. V-ATPase dependent acidification is necessary for such intracellular processes as protein sorting, zymogen activation, receptor-mediated endocytosis, and synaptic vesicle proton gradient generation. V-ATPase is composed of a cytosolic V1 domain and a transmembrane V0 domain. The V1 domain consists of three A and three B subunits, two G subunits plus the C, D, E, F, and H subunits. The V1 domain contains the ATP catalytic site. The V0 domain consists of five different subunits: a, c, c', c'', and d. This gene is one of four genes in man and mouse that encode different isoforms of the a subunit. Alternatively spliced transcript variants encoding the same protein have been described. Mutations in this gene are associated with renal tubular acidosis associated with preserved hearing.

== Interactions ==
ATP6V0A4 has been shown to interact with PFKM.
