= YWHAQ =

Protein-coding gene in the species Homo sapiens

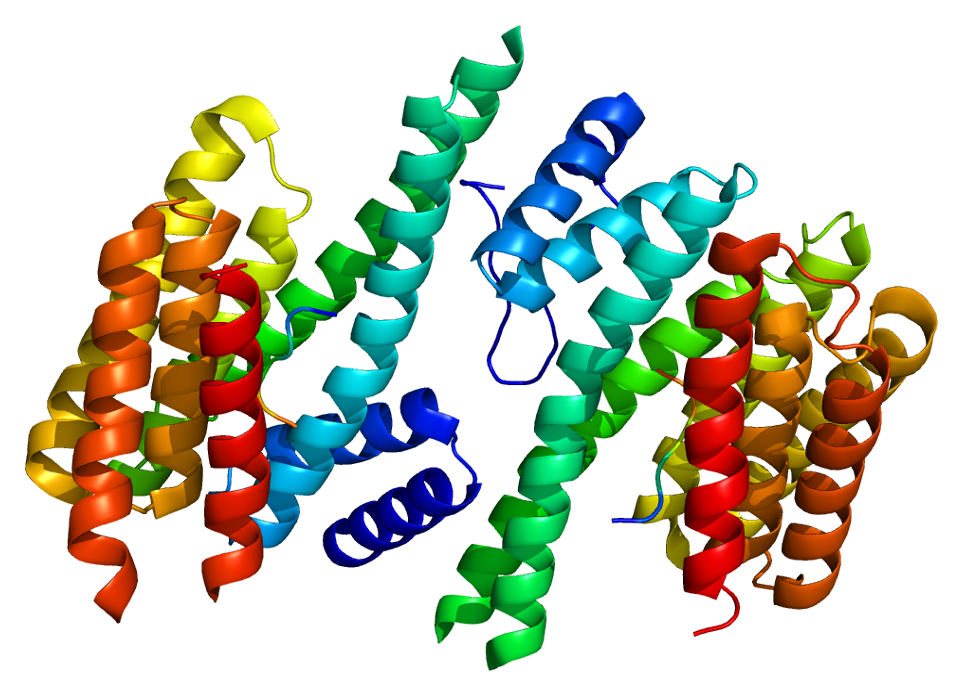

Identifiers
- Aliases: YWHAQ, 14-3-3, 1C5, HS1, tyrosine 3-monooxygenase/tryptophan 5-monooxygenase activation protein theta
- External IDs: OMIM: 609009; MGI: 3650241; GeneCards: YWHAQ
Available structures
PDB	Human UniProt search: PDBe RCSB
PDB	List of PDB id codes 2BTP, 5IQP

Gene location (Human)
Chr.	Chromosome 2 (human)
Band	2p25.1	Start	9,583,967 bp
Band	2p25.1	End	9,630,997 bp
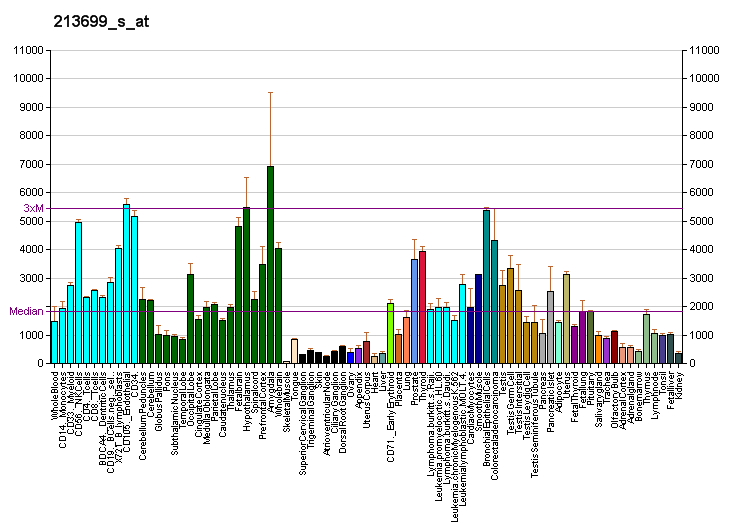

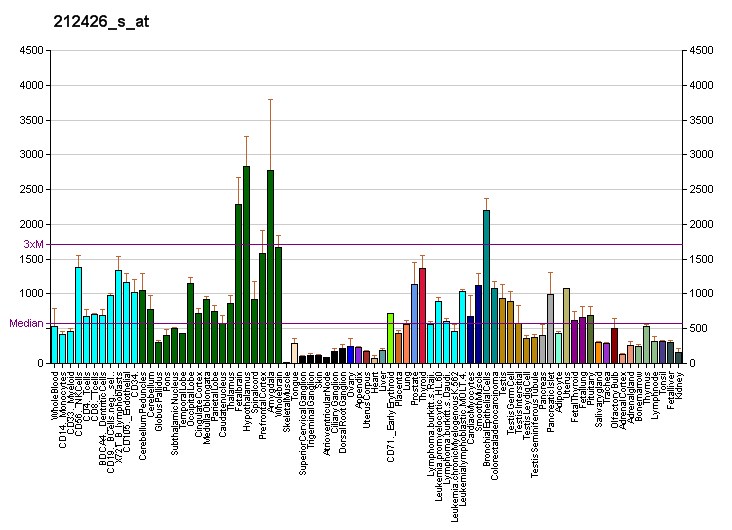

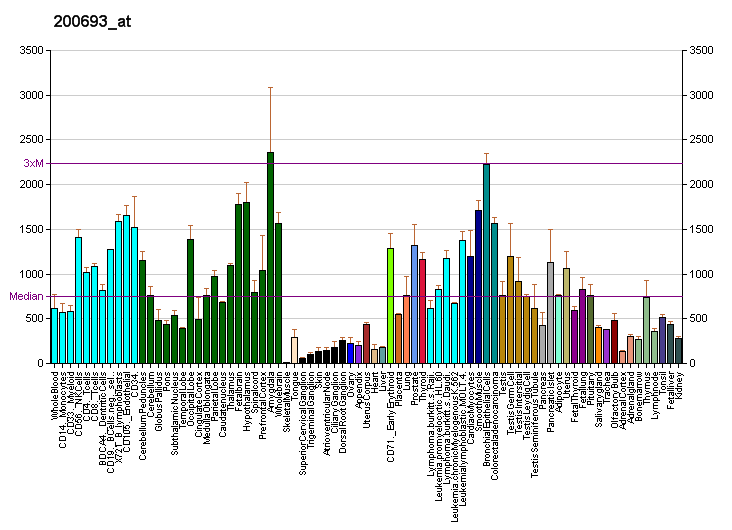
RNA expression pattern
Bgee	Human / Mouse (ortholog); Top expressed in: sperm; endothelial cell; pons; superior vestibular nucleus; parotid gland; inferior ganglion of vagus nerve; secondary oocyte; Epithelium of choroid plexus; hair follicle; human penis / n/a; More reference expression data
BioGPS	More reference expression data
Gene ontology
Molecular function	transmembrane transporter binding; protein domain specific binding; protein N-terminus binding; 14-3-3 protein binding; protein C-terminus binding; protein binding; identical protein binding
Cellular component	cytoplasm; cytosol; membrane; focal adhesion; extracellular exosome; cytoplasmic vesicle membrane; mitochondrion; protein-containing complex; synapse
Biological process	protein targeting; substantia nigra development; negative regulation of ion transmembrane transport; positive regulation of protein insertion into mitochondrial membrane involved in apoptotic signaling pathway; membrane organization; negative regulation of transcription, DNA-templated; small GTPase mediated signal transduction
Sources:Amigo / QuickGO
Orthologs
Databases	NCBI: entry; OMA: entry
Species	Human	Mouse
Entrez	10971	102634437
Ensembl	ENSG00000134308	n/a
UniProt	P27348	n/a
RefSeq (mRNA)	NM_006826	n/a
RefSeq (protein)	NP_006817	n/a
Location (UCSC)	Chr 2: 9.58 – 9.63 Mb	n/a
PubMed search
- Wikidata
View/Edit Human	View/Edit Mouse

14-3-3 protein theta is a protein that in humans is encoded by the YWHAQ gene.

== Function ==
This gene product belongs to the 14-3-3 family of proteins that mediate signal transduction by binding to phosphoserine-containing proteins. This highly conserved protein family is found in both plants and mammals, and this protein is 99% identical to the mouse and rat orthologs. This gene is upregulated in patients with amyotrophic lateral sclerosis. It contains in its 5' UTR a 6 bp tandem repeat sequence that is polymorphic; however, there is no correlation between the repeat number and the disease.

== Interactions ==
YWHAQ has been shown to interact with:

- BAX,
- BAD,
- C-Raf,
- CRTC2,
- CBL
- HDAC5,
- MEF2D,
- NRIP1,
- PFKFB2,
- PRKD1,
- PRKCZ,
- TERT, and
- UCP3.
