= SIK2 =

Protein-coding gene in humans

Identifiers
- Aliases: SIK2, LOH11CR1I, QIK, SNF1LK2, SIK-2, salt inducible kinase 2
- External IDs: OMIM: 608973; MGI: 2445031; GeneCards: SIK2
Enzyme activity
EC #	BRENDA	ExPASy	KEGG	MetaCyc
2.7.11.1	↗	↗	↗	↗

Gene location (Human)
Chr.	Chromosome 11 (human)
Band	11q23.1	Start	111,602,449 bp
Band	11q23.1	End	111,730,855 bp

Gene location (Mouse)
Chr.	Chromosome 9 (mouse)
Band	9|9 A5.3	Start	50,804,101 bp
Band	9|9 A5.3	End	50,920,373 bp
RNA expression pattern
Bgee	Human / Mouse (ortholog); Top expressed in: Epithelium of choroid plexus; cardia; germinal epithelium; adipose tissue; lower lobe of lung; hair follicle; subcutaneous adipose tissue; stromal cell of endometrium; Skeletal muscle tissue of biceps brachii; synovial joint / Top expressed in: brown adipose tissue; otic vesicle; white adipose tissue; mammary gland; subcutaneous adipose tissue; ascending aorta; muscle of thigh; neural layer of retina; genital tubercle; aortic valve; More reference expression data
BioGPS	n/a
Gene ontology
Molecular function	transferase activity; nucleotide binding; protein kinase activity; protein serine/threonine kinase activity; protein binding; ATP binding; magnesium ion binding; metal ion binding; kinase activity
Cellular component	cytoplasm; nucleus; nucleotide-activated protein kinase complex
Biological process	protein autophosphorylation; protein phosphorylation; intracellular signal transduction; phosphorylation; regulation of insulin receptor signaling pathway; cellular response to hormone stimulus; negative regulation of TOR signaling; cellular response to glucose starvation
Sources:Amigo / QuickGO
Orthologs
Databases	NCBI: entry; OMA: entry
Species	Human	Mouse
Entrez	23235	235344
Ensembl	ENSG00000170145	ENSMUSG00000037112
UniProt	Q9H0K1	Q8CFH6
RefSeq (mRNA)	NM_015191	NM_178710
RefSeq (protein)	NP_056006	NP_848825; NP_001391943; NP_001391944
Location (UCSC)	Chr 11: 111.6 – 111.73 Mb	Chr 9: 50.8 – 50.92 Mb
PubMed search
- Wikidata
View/Edit Human	View/Edit Mouse

Serine/threonine-protein kinase SIK2, also called salt inducible kinase 2, is an enzyme that in humans is encoded by the SIK2 gene (previously SNF1LK2).

== Interactions ==
SNF1LK2 has been shown to interact with CRTC2.
