= PFKM =

Mammalian protein found in Homo sapiens

Identifiers
- Aliases: PFKM, ATP-PFK, GSD7, PFK-1, PFK1, PFKA, PFKX, PPP1R122, phosphofructokinase, muscle
- External IDs: OMIM: 610681; MGI: 97548; GeneCards: PFKM
Available structures
| PDB | Ortholog search: PDBe RCSB |
| PDB | List of PDB id codes 4OMT |
Enzyme activity
| EC # | BRENDA | ExPASy | KEGG | MetaCyc |
|---|---|---|---|---|
| 2.7.1.11 | ↗ | ↗ | ↗ | ↗ |

Gene location (Mouse)
| Chr. | Chromosome 15 (mouse) |
| Band | 15|15 F1 | Start | 97,990,470 bp |
| Band | 15|15 F1 | End | 98,030,332 bp |
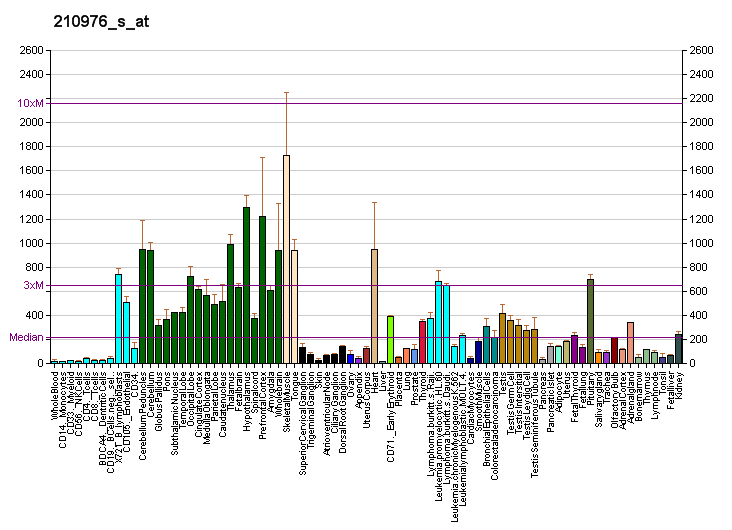
RNA expression pattern
| Bgee | Human / Mouse (ortholog); n/a / Top expressed in: triceps brachii muscle; temporal muscle; extensor digitorum longus muscle; ankle; sternocleidomastoid muscle; medial head of gastrocnemius muscle; tibialis anterior muscle; digastric muscle; vastus lateralis muscle; muscle of thigh |
| BioGPS | More reference expression data |
Gene ontology
| Molecular function | transferase activity; nucleotide binding; protein homodimerization activity; metal ion binding; kinase activity; fructose binding; kinase binding; protein C-terminus binding; catalytic activity; protein binding; identical protein binding; phosphofructokinase activity; ATP binding; 6-phosphofructokinase activity; AMP binding; monosaccharide binding; fructose-6-phosphate binding |
| Cellular component | cytoplasm; cytosol; 6-phosphofructokinase complex; sperm principal piece; apical plasma membrane; nucleus; membrane |
| Biological process | fructose 6-phosphate metabolic process; glycolysis from storage polysaccharide through glucose-1-phosphate; glycolytic process; muscle cell cellular homeostasis; glucose homeostasis; phosphorylation; canonical glycolysis; carbohydrate phosphorylation; glycogen catabolic process; protein complex oligomerization; metabolism; positive regulation of insulin secretion; positive regulation of transcription by RNA polymerase II; glycolytic process through fructose-6-phosphate; glucose catabolic process; fructose 1,6-bisphosphate metabolic process; protein homotetramerization |
Sources:Amigo / QuickGO
Orthologs
| Databases | NCBI: entry; OMA: entry |
| Species | Human | Mouse |
| Entrez | 5213 | 18642 |
| Ensembl | ENSG00000152556 | ENSMUSG00000033065 |
| UniProt | P08237 | P47857 |
| RefSeq (mRNA) | NM_000289; NM_001166686; NM_001166687; NM_001166688 | NM_001163487; NM_001163488; NM_021514; NM_001357688 |
| RefSeq (protein) | NP_000280; NP_001160158; NP_001160159; NP_001160160; NP_001341664 NP_001341666; NP_001341667; NP_001341668; NP_001341669; NP_001341670; NP_001341671; NP_001341672; NP_001341673; NP_001341674; NP_001341675; NP_001341676; NP_001341677; NP_001341665; NP_001350548 | NP_001156959; NP_001156960; NP_067489; NP_001344617 |
| Location (UCSC) | n/a | Chr 15: 97.99 – 98.03 Mb |
| PubMed search |
- Wikidata
| View/Edit Human | View/Edit Mouse |

6-phosphofructokinase, muscle type is an enzyme that in humans is encoded by the PFKM gene on chromosome 12. Three phosphofructokinase isozymes exist in humans: muscle, liver and platelet. These isozymes function as subunits of the mammalian tetramer phosphofructokinase, which catalyzes the phosphorylation of fructose-6-phosphate to fructose-1,6-bisphosphate. Tetramer composition varies depending on tissue type. This gene encodes the muscle-type isozyme. Mutations in this gene have been associated with glycogen storage disease type VII, also known as Tarui disease. Alternatively spliced transcript variants have been described.[provided by RefSeq, Nov 2009]

== Structure ==
=== Gene ===
This gene is found on chromosome 12. The coding region in PFKM only shares a 68% similarity with that of the liver-type PFKL.

=== Protein ===
This 85-kDa protein is one of two subunit types that comprise the seven tetrameric PFK isozymes. The muscle isozyme (PFK-1) is composed solely of PFKM. The liver PFK (PFK-5) contains solely the second subunit type, PFKL, while the erythrocyte PFK includes five isozymes composed of different combinations of PFKM and PFKL. These subunits evolved from a common prokaryotic ancestor via gene duplication and mutation events. Generally, the N-terminal of the subunits carries out their catalytic activity while the C-terminal contains allosteric ligand binding sites. In particular, the binding site for the PFK inhibitor citrate is found in the PFKL C-terminal region.

== Function ==
This gene encodes one of three protein subunits of PFK, which are expressed and combined to form the tetrameric PFK in a tissue-specific manner. As a PFK subunit, PFKM is involved in catalyzing the phosphorylation of fructose 6-phosphate to fructose 1,6-bisphosphate. This irreversible reaction serves as the major rate-limiting step of glycolysis.

Though the PFKM subunit majorly incorporates into muscle and erythrocyte PFKs, PFKM also is expressed in the heart, brain, and testis.

== Clinical significance ==
As the erythrocyte PFK is composed of both PFKL and PFKM, this heterogeneic composition is attributed with the differential PFK activity and organ involvement observed in some inherited PFK deficiency states in which myopathy or hemolysis or both can occur, such as glycogenosis type VII, also known as Tarui disease. Notably, mutations in PFKM have been shown to cause Tarui disease due to homozygosity for catalytically inactive M subunits. PFKM is confirmed to be involved in muscle PFK deficiency with early-onset hyperuricemia.

Even though PFKM functions to drive glycolysis, its overexpression has been associated with type 2 diabetes and insulin resistance in skeletal muscle. One possible explanation suggests that the overexpression is meant to compensate for the allosteric inhibition of PFK1 as a result of excess oxidation of free fatty acids and accumulation of citrate and acetyl-CoA.

== Interactions ==
PFKM has been shown to interact with ATP6V0A4.

== Interactive pathway map ==
Click on genes, proteins and metabolites below to link to respective articles. (Note: The interactive pathway map can be edited at WikiPathways: "GlycolysisGluconeogenesis_WP534".)

Glycolysis and Gluconeogenesis edit

== See also ==
- PFK
- PFK-1
- PFKL
- PFKP
