= PFKL =

Mammalian protein found in Homo sapiens

Identifiers
- Aliases: PFKL, ATP-PFK, PFK-B, PFK-L, phosphofructokinase, liver type
- External IDs: OMIM: 171860; MGI: 97547; GeneCards: PFKL
Enzyme activity
EC #	BRENDA	ExPASy	KEGG	MetaCyc
2.7.1.11	↗	↗	↗	↗

Gene location (Human)
Chr.	Chromosome 21 (human)
Band	21q22.3	Start	44,300,051 bp
Band	21q22.3	End	44,327,376 bp

Gene location (Mouse)
Chr.	Chromosome 10 (mouse)
Band	10 C1|10 39.72 cM	Start	77,822,781 bp
Band	10 C1|10 39.72 cM	End	77,845,917 bp
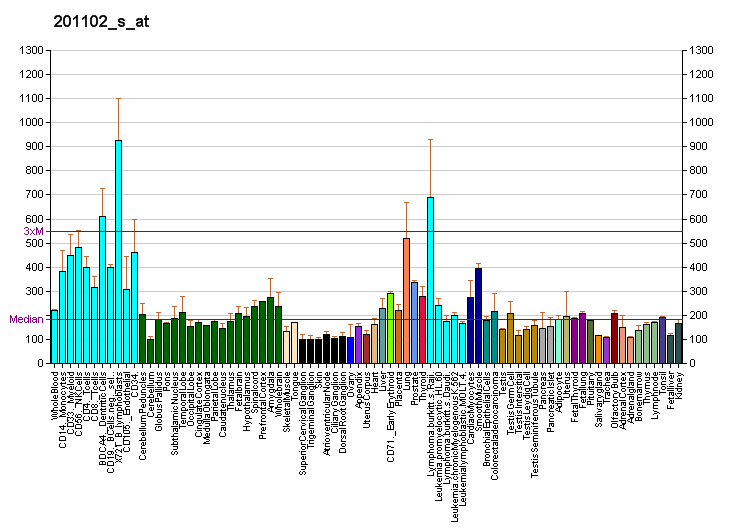

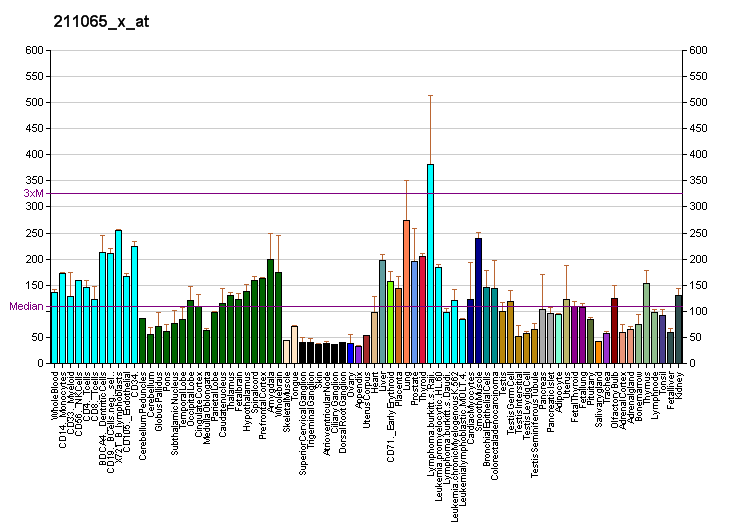

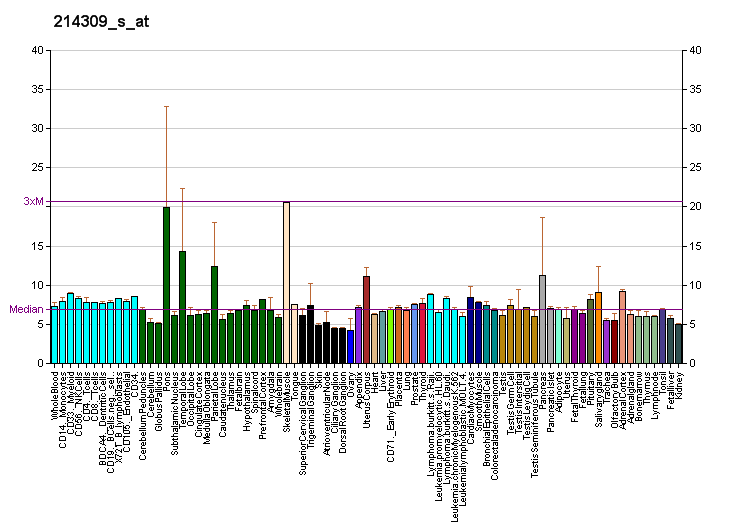
RNA expression pattern
Bgee	Human / Mouse (ortholog); Top expressed in: mucosa of transverse colon; tibial nerve; C1 segment; right frontal lobe; skin of abdomen; body of stomach; skin of leg; canal of the cervix; right uterine tube; ectocervix / Top expressed in: neural layer of retina; dentate gyrus of hippocampal formation granule cell; epiblast; vestibular membrane of cochlear duct; perirhinal cortex; otic vesicle; brown adipose tissue; primitive streak; CA3 field; entorhinal cortex; More reference expression data
BioGPS	More reference expression data
Gene ontology
Molecular function	transferase activity; nucleotide binding; monosaccharide binding; metal ion binding; kinase activity; fructose binding; kinase binding; protein binding; catalytic activity; identical protein binding; ATP binding; 6-phosphofructokinase activity; fructose-6-phosphate binding; AMP binding
Cellular component	cytoplasm; membrane; 6-phosphofructokinase complex; extracellular exosome; cytosol; extracellular region; secretory granule lumen; ficolin-1-rich granule lumen
Biological process	negative regulation of insulin secretion; phosphorylation; canonical glycolysis; protein complex oligomerization; metabolism; glycolytic process through fructose-6-phosphate; protein homotetramerization; glycolytic process; fructose 6-phosphate metabolic process; fructose 1,6-bisphosphate metabolic process; response to glucose; neutrophil degranulation; carbohydrate metabolic process; glucose catabolic process
Sources:Amigo / QuickGO
Orthologs
Databases	NCBI: entry; OMA: entry
Species	Human	Mouse
Entrez	5211	18641
Ensembl	ENSG00000141959	ENSMUSG00000020277
UniProt	P17858; Q7L2M7	P12382
RefSeq (mRNA)	NM_001002021; NM_002626	NM_008826; NM_001358793
RefSeq (protein)	NP_001002021; NP_002617; NP_001002021.2; NP_002617.3	NP_032852; NP_001345722
Location (UCSC)	Chr 21: 44.3 – 44.33 Mb	Chr 10: 77.82 – 77.85 Mb
PubMed search
- Wikidata
View/Edit Human	View/Edit Mouse

6-phosphofructokinase, liver type (PFKL) is an enzyme that in humans is encoded by the PFKL gene on chromosome 21. This gene encodes the liver (L) isoform of phosphofructokinase-1, an enzyme that catalyzes the conversion of D-fructose 6-phosphate to D-fructose 1,6-bisphosphate, which is a key step in glucose metabolism (glycolysis). This enzyme is a tetramer that may be composed of different subunits encoded by distinct genes in different tissues. Alternative splicing results in multiple transcript variants. [provided by RefSeq, Mar 2014]

== Structure ==
=== Gene ===
The PFKL mRNA sequence includes 55 nucleotides at the 5' and 515 nucleotides at the 3' noncoding regions, as well as 2,337 nucleotides in the coding region, encoding 779 amino acids. This coding region only shares a 68% similarity between PFKL and the muscle-type PFKM.

=== Protein ===
This 80-kDa protein is one of three subunit types that comprise the five tetrameric PFK isozymes. The liver PFK (PFK-5) contains solely PFKL, while the erythrocyte PFK includes five isozymes composed of different combinations of PFKL and the second subunit type, PFKM. The muscle isozyme (PFK-1) is composed solely of PFKM. These subunits evolved from a common prokaryotic ancestor via gene duplication and mutation events. Generally, the N-terminal of the subunits carries out their catalytic activity while the C-terminal contains allosteric ligand binding sites

== Function ==
This gene encodes one of three protein subunits of PFK, which are expressed and combined to form the tetrameric PFK in a tissue-specific manner. As a PFK subunit, PFKL is involved in catalyzing the phosphorylation of fructose 6-phosphate to fructose 1,6-bisphosphate. This irreversible reaction serves as the major rate-limiting step of glycolysis. Notably, knockdown of PFKL has been shown to impair glycolysis and promote metabolism via the pentose phosphate pathway. Moreover, PFKL regulates NADPH oxidase activity through the pentose phosphate pathway and according to NADPH levels.

PFKL has also been detected in leukocytes, kidney, and brain.

== Clinical significance ==
As the erythrocyte PFK is composed of both PFKL and PFKM, this heterogeneic composition is attributed with the differential PFK activity and organ involvement observed in some inherited PFK deficiency states in which myopathy or hemolysis or both can occur, such as glycogenosis type VII (Tarui disease).

Overexpression of PFKL has been associated with Down's syndrome (DS) erythrocytes and fibroblasts and attributed with biochemical changes in PFK that enhance its glycolytic function. Moreover, the PFKL gene maps to the triplicated region of chromosome 21 responsible for DS, indicating that this gene, too, has been triplicated.

== Interactive pathway map ==
Click on genes, proteins and metabolites below to link to respective articles. (Note: The interactive pathway map can be edited at WikiPathways: "GlycolysisGluconeogenesis_WP534".)

Glycolysis and Gluconeogenesis edit

== See also ==
- PFK
- PFKM
- PFKP
