= Inosine kinase =

Class of enzymes

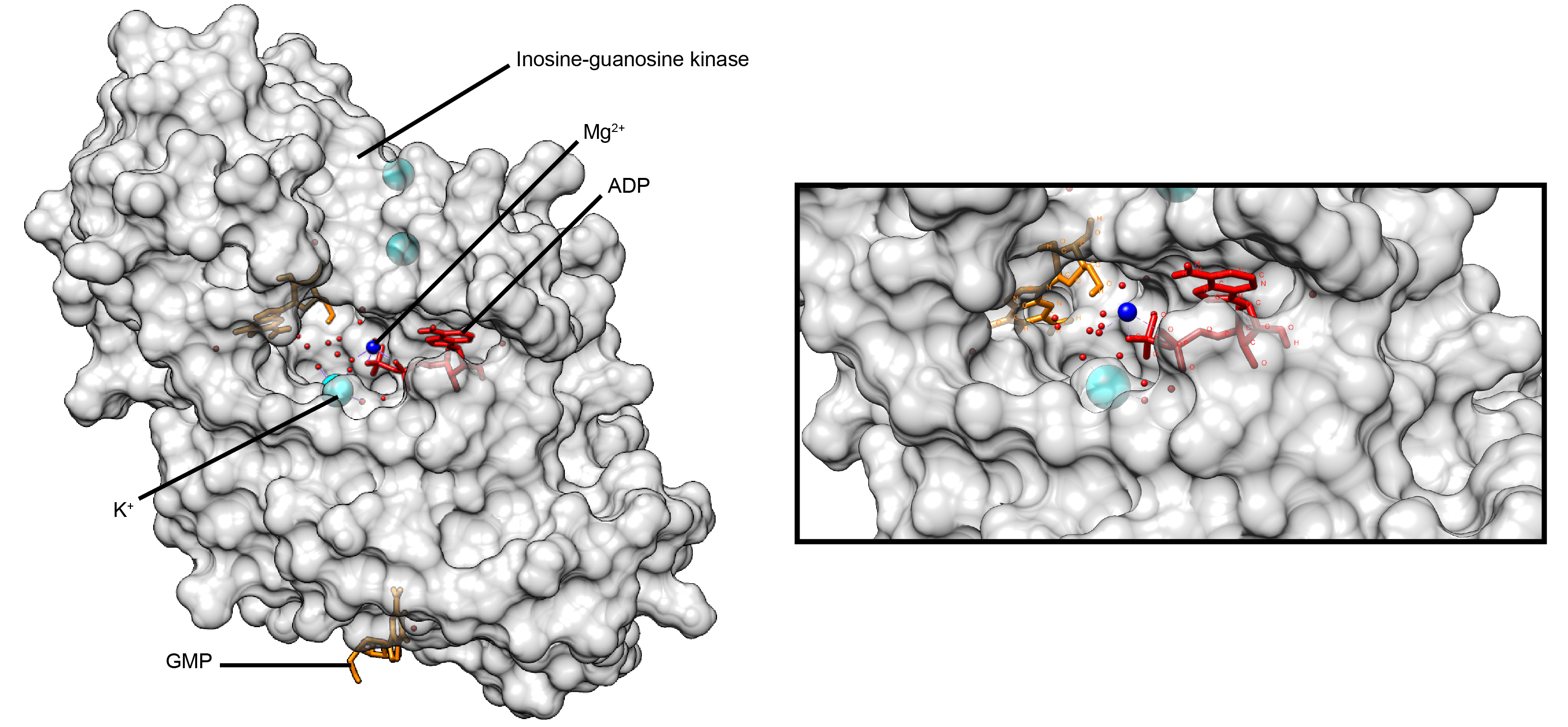
- Inosine kinase in Escherichia coli (PDB: 6VWO)

Identifiers
- EC no.: 2.7.1.73
- CAS no.: 37237-46-0

Databases
- IntEnz: IntEnz view
- BRENDA: BRENDA entry
- ExPASy: NiceZyme view
- KEGG: KEGG entry
- MetaCyc: metabolic pathway
- PRIAM: profile
- PDB structures: RCSB PDB PDBe PDBsum
- Gene Ontology: AmiGO / QuickGO
Search
- PMC: articles
- PubMed: articles
- NCBI: proteins

Inosine kinase (EC 2.7.1.73) is an enzyme that catalyzes the chemical reaction

ATP +
inosine
ADP +
inosinic acid

The enzyme first characterised from Ehrlich ascites cells converts inosine to inosinic acid by transferring a phosphate group from the cofactor, adenosine triphosphate (ATP), which is converted to adenosine diphosphate (ADP).

Inosine kinase belongs to the phosphofructokinase B (PfkB) family of sugar kinases. Other members of this family (also known as the Ribokinase family) include ribokinase (RK) adenosine kinase (AK), fructokinase, and 1-phosphofructokinase. The members of the PfkB/RK family are identified by the presence of three conserved sequence motifs. The structures of several PfK family of proteins have been determined from a number of organisms and the enzymatic activity of this family of this family of protein shows a dependence on the presence of pentavalent ions. Despite low sequence similarity between inosine kinase and other PfkB family of proteins, these proteins are quite similar at structural levels. Other names in common use include inosine-guanosine kinase, and inosine kinase (phosphorylating). This enzyme participates in purine metabolism.
