= 1-phosphofructokinase =

InterPro Family

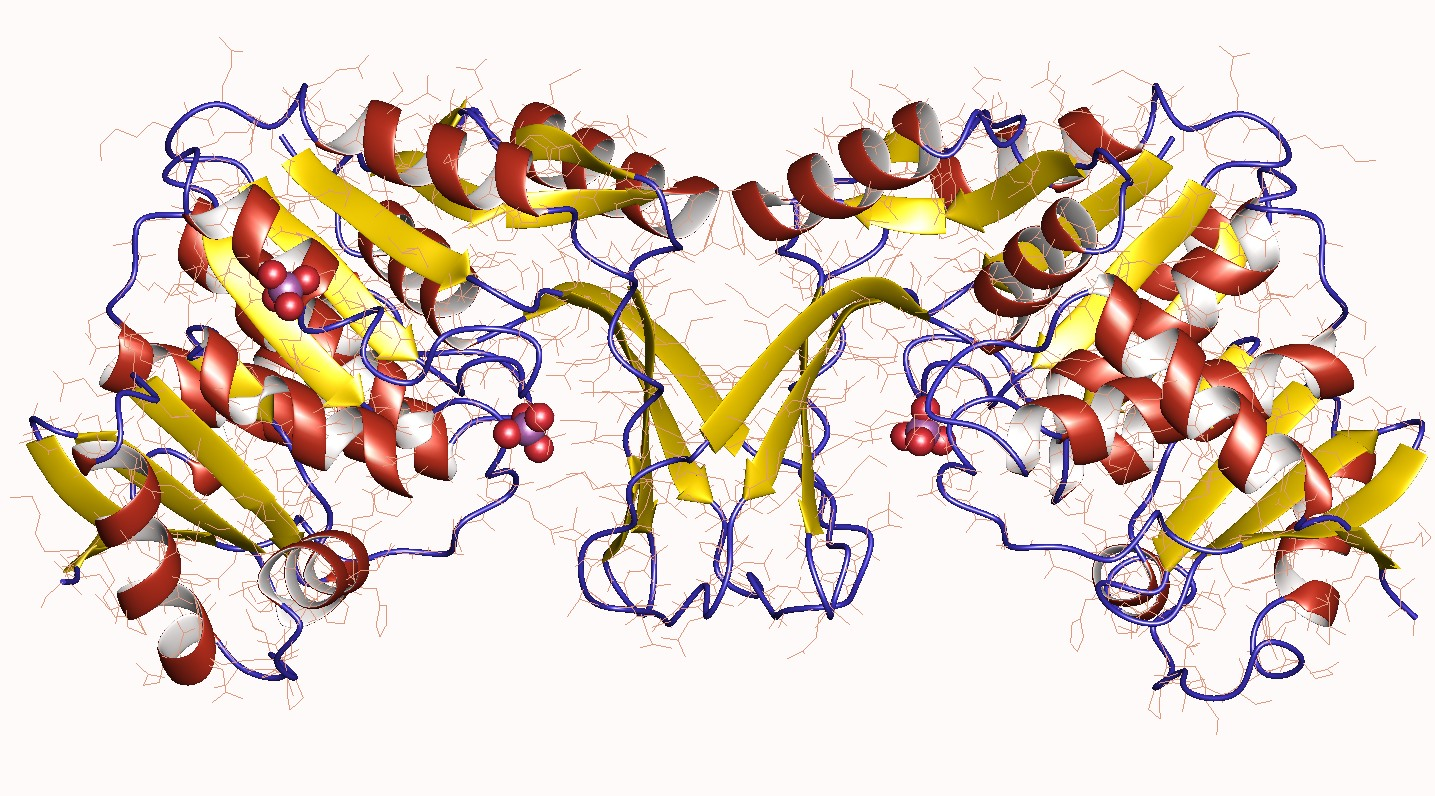
- Fructose 1-phosphate kinase homodimer, Bacillus halodurans

Identifiers
- EC no.: 2.7.1.56
- CAS no.: 37278-03-8

Databases
- IntEnz: IntEnz view
- BRENDA: BRENDA entry
- ExPASy: NiceZyme view
- KEGG: KEGG entry
- MetaCyc: metabolic pathway
- PRIAM: profile
- PDB structures: RCSB PDB PDBe PDBsum
- Gene Ontology: AmiGO / QuickGO
Search
- PMC: articles
- PubMed: articles
- NCBI: proteins

1-phosphofructokinase (EC 2.7.1.56) is an enzyme that catalyzes the chemical reaction

ATP +
fructose 1-phosphate
ADP +
fructose-1,6-diphosphate

The enzyme characterised from Aerobacter aerogenes converts D-fructose 1-phosphate (shown in its furanose form) to fructose-1,6-diphosphate by transferring a phosphate group from the cofactor, adenosine triphosphate (ATP), which is converted to adenosine diphosphate (ADP).

This enzyme belongs to the phosphofructokinase B (PfkB) or ribokinase family of sugar kinases, specifically those transferring phosphorus-containing groups (phosphotransferases) with an alcohol group as acceptor. The systematic name of this enzyme class is ATP:D-fructose-phosphate 6-phosphotransferase. Other names in common use include fructose-1-phosphate kinase, 1-phosphofructokinase (phosphorylating), D-fructose-1-phosphate kinase, fructose 1-phosphate kinase, and 1-phosphofructokinase. This enzyme participates in fructose and mannose metabolism. The members of the PfkB/RK family are identified by the presence of three conserved sequence motifs and their enzymatic activity generally shows a dependence on the presence of pentavalent ions.

== Structure ==
As of 2021, two structures have been solved for this class of enzymes, with the PDB accession codes PDB: 2JG5 and PDB: 2ABQ, both from structural genomics efforts. The protein is a homodimer.
