= Seiichiro Tarui =

Seiichiro Tarui (垂井 清一郎, Tarui Seiichirō; born 1927) is a Japanese physician and metabolic disorder researcher. He received the Uehara Award in 1990 while working as a professor at the University of Osaka. He also received the Takeda Medical Science Prize in 1995.

== Biography ==
Seiichiro Tarui was born in Kōshien, Nishinomiya, Hyōgo Prefecture. He qualified in medicine at the University of Osaka in 1953. From 1959 he was an assistant in the Second Department of Internal Medicine at this university, where he conducted clinical research on disorders of carbohydrate metabolism. He was appointed as Associate Professor of Internal Medicine in 1966, and in 1978 he was elevated to the chair of internal medicine. He retired with emeritus status in 1991. He then became Director of Otemae Hospital, Osaka.

== Associated eponyms ==
Tarui's disease – An inborn error of glycogen metabolism characterized by phosphofructokinase deficiency in the muscles, associated with abnormal deposition of glycogen in muscle tissues. Tarui disease typically manifests itself in childhood with exercise intolerance and anaemia. The fatal variant normally onsets within the first year of life, and all reported cases have died before the age of four. The adult variant normally sets in during late adulthood in the form of progressive limb muscle weakness without myoglobinuria or cramps.
