= PFKP =

Mammalian protein found in Homo sapiens

Identifiers
- Aliases: PFKP, ATP-PFK, PFK-C, PFK-P, PFKF, phosphofructokinase, platelet
- External IDs: OMIM: 171840; MGI: 1891833; GeneCards: PFKP
Available structures
PDB	Ortholog search: PDBe RCSB
PDB	List of PDB id codes 4RH3, 4U1R, 4WL0, 4XYJ, 4XYK, 4XZ2
Enzyme activity
EC #	BRENDA	ExPASy	KEGG	MetaCyc
2.7.1.11	↗	↗	↗	↗

Gene location (Human)
Chr.	Chromosome 10 (human)
Band	10p15.2	Start	3,066,333 bp
Band	10p15.2	End	3,137,718 bp

Gene location (Mouse)
Chr.	Chromosome 13 (mouse)
Band	13|13 A1	Start	6,629,804 bp
Band	13|13 A1	End	6,698,813 bp
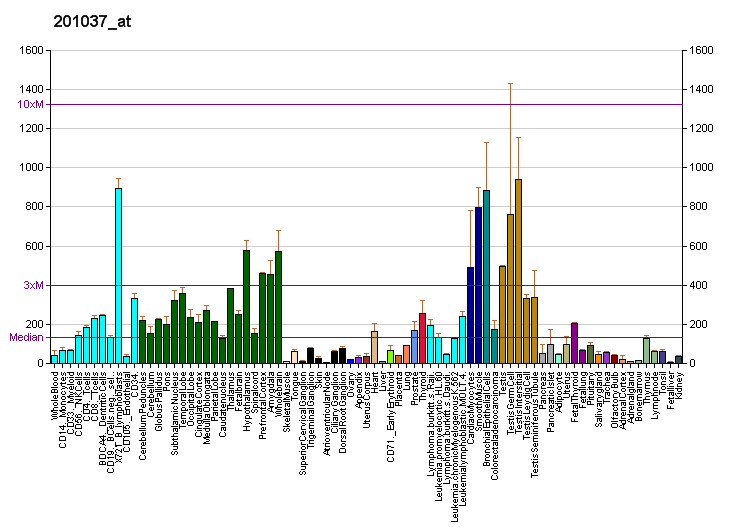
RNA expression pattern
Bgee	Human / Mouse (ortholog); Top expressed in: tendon of biceps brachii; saphenous vein; spinal ganglia; right frontal lobe; left testis; Brodmann area 9; right testis; apex of heart; right hemisphere of cerebellum; sperm / Top expressed in: neural layer of retina; facial motor nucleus; superior frontal gyrus; anterior horn of spinal cord; dentate gyrus of hippocampal formation granule cell; cingulate gyrus; Epithelium of choroid plexus; spermatocyte; central gray substance of midbrain; pontine nuclei; More reference expression data
BioGPS	More reference expression data
Gene ontology
Molecular function	transferase activity; nucleotide binding; protein-containing complex binding; metal ion binding; kinase activity; catalytic activity; ATP binding; 6-phosphofructokinase activity; cadherin binding; identical protein binding; AMP binding; monosaccharide binding; fructose-6-phosphate binding
Cellular component	cytosol; membrane; extracellular exosome; nucleus; cytoplasm; extracellular matrix; 6-phosphofructokinase complex
Biological process	fructose 6-phosphate metabolic process; glycolytic process; phosphorylation; canonical glycolysis; metabolism; cellular response to leukemia inhibitory factor; glucose catabolic process; fructose 1,6-bisphosphate metabolic process; protein complex oligomerization; protein homotetramerization; glycolytic process through fructose-6-phosphate
Sources:Amigo / QuickGO
Orthologs
Databases	NCBI: entry; OMA: entry
Species	Human	Mouse
Entrez	5214	56421
Ensembl	ENSG00000067057	ENSMUSG00000021196
UniProt	Q01813	Q9WUA3
RefSeq (mRNA)	NM_001242339; NM_002627; NM_001323067; NM_001323068; NM_001323069 NM_001323070; NM_001323071; NM_001323072; NM_001323073; NM_001323074; NM_001345944	NM_001291071; NM_019703
RefSeq (protein)	NP_001229268; NP_001309996; NP_001309997; NP_001309998; NP_001309999 NP_001310000; NP_001310001; NP_001310002; NP_001310003; NP_001332873; NP_002618	NP_001278000; NP_062677
Location (UCSC)	Chr 10: 3.07 – 3.14 Mb	Chr 13: 6.63 – 6.7 Mb
PubMed search
- Wikidata
View/Edit Human	View/Edit Mouse

Phosphofructokinase, platelet, also known as PFKP, is an enzyme which in humans is encoded by the PFKP gene.

== Function ==
The PFKP gene encodes the platelet isoform of phosphofructokinase (PFK) (ATP:D-fructose-6-phosphate-1-phosphotransferase, EC 2.7.1.11). PFK catalyzes the irreversible conversion of fructose 6-phosphate to fructose 1,6-bisphosphate and is a key regulatory enzyme in glycolysis. The PFKP gene, which maps to chromosome 10p, is also expressed in fibroblasts. See also the muscle (PFKM) and liver (PFKL) isoforms of phosphofructokinase, which map to chromosomes 12q13 and 21q22, respectively. Full tetrameric phosphofructokinase enzyme expressed in platelets can be composed of subunits P4, P3L, and P2L2.

== Interactive pathway map ==
Click on genes, proteins and metabolites below to link to respective articles. (Note: The interactive pathway map can be edited at WikiPathways: "GlycolysisGluconeogenesis_WP534".)

Glycolysis and Gluconeogenesis edit
