= PFKFB4 =

Protein-coding gene in the species Homo sapiens

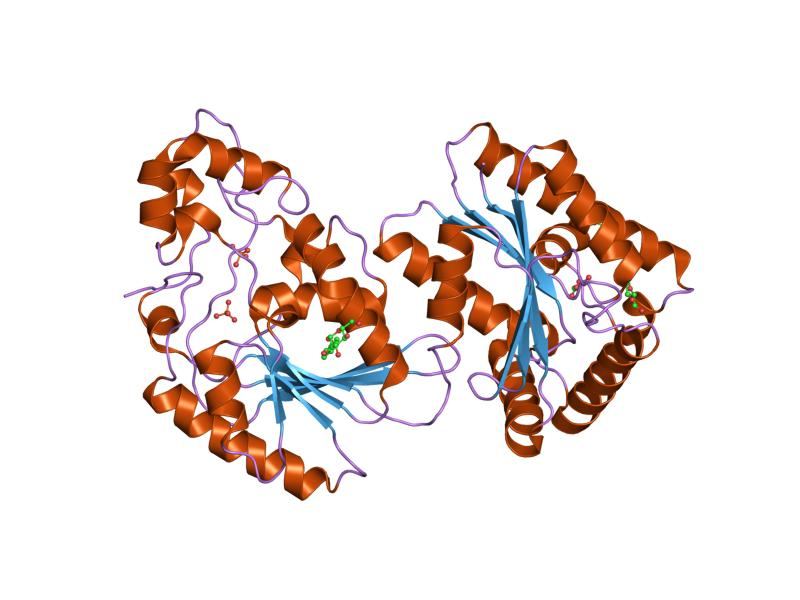

Identifiers
- Aliases: PFKFB4, 6-phosphofructo-2-kinase/fructose-2,6-biphosphatase 4
- External IDs: OMIM: 605320; MGI: 2687284; GeneCards: PFKFB4
Enzyme activity
EC #	BRENDA	ExPASy	KEGG	MetaCyc
2.7.1.105	↗	↗	↗	↗
3.1.3.46	↗	↗	↗	↗

Gene location (Human)
Chr.	Chromosome 3 (human)
Band	3p21.31	Start	48,517,684 bp
Band	3p21.31	End	48,562,015 bp

Gene location (Mouse)
Chr.	Chromosome 9 (mouse)
Band	9|9 F2	Start	108,820,846 bp
Band	9|9 F2	End	108,861,296 bp
RNA expression pattern
Bgee	Human / Mouse (ortholog); Top expressed in: blood; monocyte; right testis; left testis; stromal cell of endometrium; granulocyte; jejunal mucosa; gonad; duodenum; body of pancreas / Top expressed in: granulocyte; muscle of thigh; spermatocyte; vastus lateralis muscle; triceps brachii muscle; knee joint; jejunum; gastrula; duodenum; skeletal muscle tissue; More reference expression data
BioGPS	n/a
Gene ontology
Molecular function	transferase activity; nucleotide binding; fructose-2,6-bisphosphate 2-phosphatase activity; catalytic activity; hydrolase activity; ATP binding; kinase activity; 6-phosphofructo-2-kinase activity
Cellular component	cytosol
Biological process	fructose metabolic process; metabolism; fructose 2,6-bisphosphate metabolic process; phosphorylation; dephosphorylation; carbohydrate phosphorylation; positive regulation of glycolytic process
Sources:Amigo / QuickGO
Orthologs
Databases	NCBI: entry; OMA: entry
Species	Human	Mouse
Entrez	5210	270198
Ensembl	ENSG00000114268	ENSMUSG00000025648
UniProt	Q16877	Q6DTY7
RefSeq (mRNA)	NM_004567; NM_001317134; NM_001317135; NM_001317136; NM_001317137 NM_001317138	NM_001039215; NM_001039216; NM_001039217; NM_173019
RefSeq (protein)	NP_001304063; NP_001304064; NP_001304065; NP_001304066; NP_001304067 NP_004558	NP_766607
Location (UCSC)	Chr 3: 48.52 – 48.56 Mb	Chr 9: 108.82 – 108.86 Mb
PubMed search
- Wikidata
View/Edit Human	View/Edit Mouse

6-phosphofructo-2-kinase/fructose-2,6-biphosphatase 4 also known as PFKFB4 is an enzyme which in humans is encoded by the PFKFB4 gene.

== Function ==
The bifunctional 6-phosphofructo-2-kinase (EC 2.7.1.105)/fructose-2,6-bisphosphatase (EC 3.1.3.46) (PFKFB) regulates the steady-state concentration of fructose 2,6-bisphosphate, an activator of a key regulatory enzyme of glycolysis, phosphofructokinase.

In 2012 research by scientists at Cancer Research UK’s London Research Institute show that an enzyme called PFKFB4 is essential for balancing these two processes – making sure the cell’s energy needs are met without allowing free radicals to build up and trigger cell death. Study leader Dr. Almut Schulze, said: “Our study suggests that PFKFB4 acts to fine-tune the process by which cells convert glucose into energy. Blocking this enzyme in prostate cancer cells grown in the lab stalled growth and triggered a catastrophic build-up of free-radicals, suggesting that it could be a suitable drug target. Importantly, this route to energy production is common to many different types of cancer, suggesting that drugs to target it could potentially be used to treat a variety of cancers.”
