= PFKFB3 =

Protein-coding gene in the species Homo sapiens

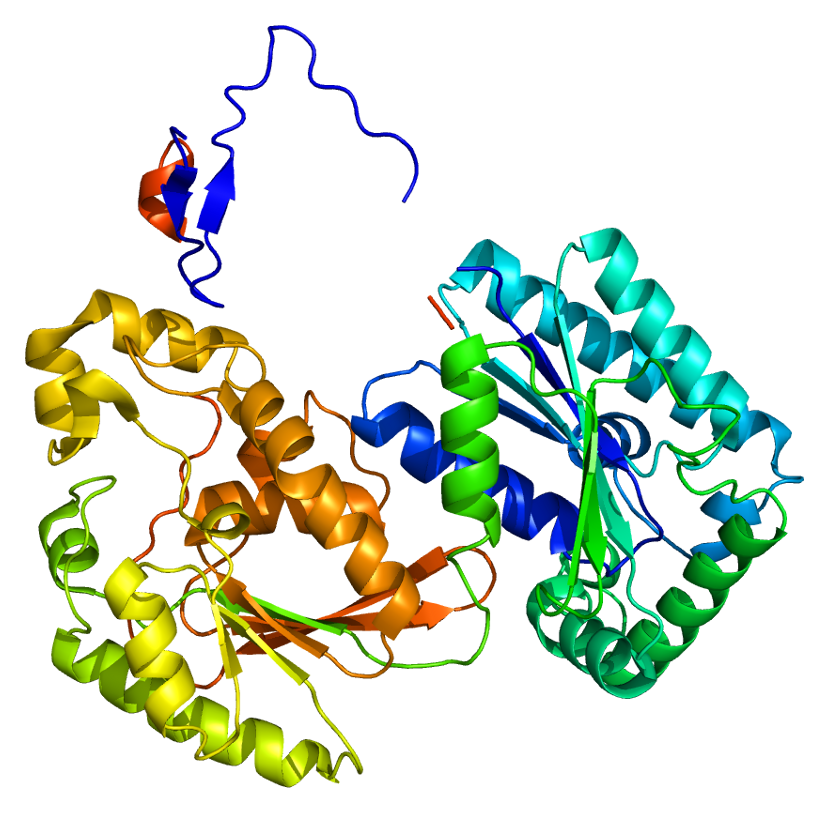

Identifiers
- Aliases: PFKFB3, IPFK2, PFK2, iPFK-2, 6-phosphofructo-2-kinase/fructose-2,6-biphosphatase 3
- External IDs: OMIM: 605319; MGI: 2181202; GeneCards: PFKFB3
Available structures
PDB	Human UniProt search: PDBe RCSB
PDB	List of PDB id codes 2AXN, 2DWO, 2DWP, 2I1V, 3QPU, 3QPV, 3QPW, 4MA4, 5AJV, 5AJW, 5AJX, 5AJY, 5AJZ, 5AK0, 4D4K, 4D4M, 4D4L, 4D4J
Enzyme activity
EC #	BRENDA	ExPASy	KEGG	MetaCyc
2.7.1.105	↗	↗	↗	↗
3.1.3.46	↗	↗	↗	↗

Gene location (Human)
Chr.	Chromosome 10 (human)
Band	10p15.1	Start	6,144,934 bp
Band	10p15.1	End	6,254,644 bp

Gene location (Mouse)
Chr.	Chromosome 2 (mouse)
Band	2|2 A1	Start	11,476,244 bp
Band	2|2 A1	End	11,558,888 bp
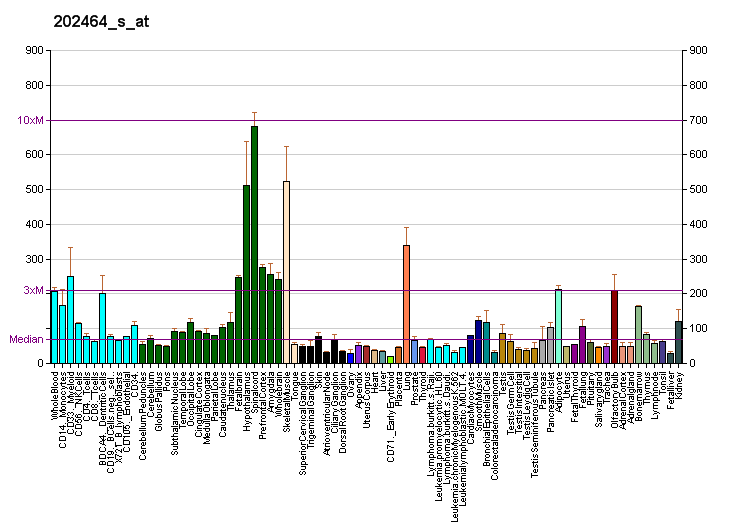
RNA expression pattern
Bgee	Human / Mouse (ortholog); Top expressed in: pancreatic ductal cell; renal medulla; endothelial cell; subcutaneous adipose tissue; internal globus pallidus; gastrocnemius muscle; lower lobe of lung; periodontal fiber; external globus pallidus; gastric mucosa / Top expressed in: medial head of gastrocnemius muscle; triceps brachii muscle; temporal muscle; brown adipose tissue; subcutaneous adipose tissue; white adipose tissue; vastus lateralis muscle; mesenteric lymph nodes; tunica adventitia of aorta; intercostal muscle; More reference expression data
BioGPS	More reference expression data
Gene ontology
Molecular function	transferase activity; nucleotide binding; fructose-2,6-bisphosphate 2-phosphatase activity; catalytic activity; hydrolase activity; ATP binding; kinase activity; 6-phosphofructo-2-kinase activity
Cellular component	cytosol; nucleoplasm
Biological process	fructose metabolic process; metabolism; brain development; fructose 2,6-bisphosphate metabolic process; phosphorylation; dephosphorylation; carbohydrate phosphorylation; positive regulation of glycolytic process
Sources:Amigo / QuickGO
Orthologs
Databases	NCBI: entry; OMA: entry
Species	Human	Mouse
Entrez	5209	170768
Ensembl	ENSG00000170525	ENSMUSG00000026773
UniProt	Q16875; Q9BQU1	n/a
RefSeq (mRNA)	NM_001145443; NM_001282630; NM_001314063; NM_004566; NM_001323016 NM_001323017; NM_001363545	NM_001177752; NM_001177753; NM_001177754; NM_001177755; NM_001177756 NM_001177757; NM_001177758; NM_133232; NM_172976
RefSeq (protein)	NP_001138915; NP_001269559; NP_001300992; NP_001309945; NP_001309946 NP_004557; NP_001350474	n/a
Location (UCSC)	Chr 10: 6.14 – 6.25 Mb	Chr 2: 11.48 – 11.56 Mb
PubMed search
- Wikidata
View/Edit Human	View/Edit Mouse

PFKFB3 is a gene that encodes the 6-phosphofructo-2-kinase/fructose-2,6-biphosphatase 3 enzyme in humans. It is one of 4 tissue-specific PFKFB isoenzymes identified currently (PFKFB1-4).

== Gene ==
The PFKFB3 gene is mapped to single locus on chromosome 10 (10p15-p14). It spans a region of 32.5kb with an open reading frame that is 5,675bp long. It is estimated to consist of 19 exons, of which 15 are regularly expressed. Alternative splicing of the variable, COOH-terminal domain has been observed, leading to 6 different isoforms termed UBI2K1 to UBI2K6 in humans. Different nomenclature also recognizes two broad categories of PFKFB3 isoforms, termed 'inducible' and 'ubiquitous'. The inducible protein isoform, iPFK2, is named as such because its expression has been shown to be induced by hypoxic conditions.

The PFKFB3 promoter is predicted to contain multiple binding sites, including Sp-1 and AP-2 binding sites. It also contains motifs for the binding of E-box, nuclear factor-1 (NF-1), and progesterone response element. Expression of the promoter is shown to be induce by phorbol esters and cyclic-AMP-dependent protein kinase signaling.

== Structure ==
The four PFKFB isoforms share high (85%) '2-Kase/2-Pase core' sequence homology, but have different properties based on variable N- and C- terminal regulatory domains and variation in residues surrounding the active sites. The PFKFB3 inducible isoform has higher '2-Kase' (kinase) activity than other isoforms, due to phosphorylation of Ser-460 by PKA or AMP-dependent protein kinase. The high '2-Kase' activity of PFKFB3 is also due to the lack of a specific Ser that is phosphorylated in the other PFKFB isoforms to decrease kinase activity.

The primary protein encoded by PFKFB3, iPFK2, consists of 590 amino acids. It has a predicted molecular weight of 66.9 kDa and an isoelectric point of 8.64. The crystal structure was determined in 2006:

- Researcher found that iPFK2 has a beta-hairpin N-terminal structure that secures the binding of fructose-6-phosphate to the active site via interaction with the protein's '2-Pase' domain. There are two active pockets within iPFK2 for fructose-2,6-bisphosphatase and 6-phosphofructo-2-kinase which are structurally different. The F-2,6-BP active site structurally open, while the active pocket of 6-phosphofructo-2-kinase is more rigid. This rigidity permits the independent binding of F-6-P and ATP with increased affinity than other isoforms.

== Function ==
iPFK2 converts fructose-6-phosphate to fructose-2,6-bisP (F2,6BP). F2,6BP is a 'potent' allosteric activator of 6-phosphofructokinase-1 (PFK-1), stimulating glycolysis. Click to see image of PFFKB3 function.

== Role in neuronal excitotoxicity ==
In neurons, glucose metabolism via glycolysis is usually low when compared to astrocytes. According Astrocyte-to-Neuron Lactate Shuttle Hypothesis, glucose uptake by the brain parenchyma occurs predominantly into astrocytes which subsequently release lactate for the use of neurons. In neurons, glucose is mainly metabolized through the pentose–phosphate pathway (PPP), which is required for NADPH(H+) regeneration and maintenance of neuronal redox status. This neuronal metabolic switch is dictated by the PFKFB3 activity. In neurons, PFKFB3 protein abundance is negligible due to the continuous proteasomal degradation of the enzyme. However, overexcitation of N-methyl-D-aspartate subtype of glutamate receptors (NMDAR), known as excitotoxicity, stabilizes PFKFB3 protein in neurons, resulting in a redirection of glucose flux from PPP to glycolysis, followed by low NADPH(H+) availability for proper GSH regeneration; this ultimately leads to oxidative stress and neuronal death. Silencing of PFKFB3 with small interfering RNA in neurons in vitro prevents the increase in ROS and apoptotic death induced by excitotoxic stimulus. Pharmacological inhibition of PFKFB3 in vitro also protects neurons from apoptosis induced by NMDAR overexcitation as well as from amyloid-ß peptide-induced neurotoxicity. When used in vivo in a mouse model of ischaemic stroke, PFKFB3 inhibitor alleviates motor discoordination and brain infarct injury

== Cancer Connections ==
=== Warburg Effect ===
The Warburg effect, proposed by Otto Warbug in 1956, describes the upregulation of glycolysis in most cancer cells, even in the presence of oxygen. The high rate of glycolysis is accompanied by increased lactic acid fermentation, providing additional nutrients for cancer cell growth and tumorigenesis.

PFKFB3 is associated with the Warburg effect because its activity increases the rate of glycolysis. PFKFB3 has been found to be upregulated in numerous cancers, including colon, breast, ovarian, and thyroid. Reduced methylation of PFKFB3 is also found in some cancers, triggering the shift to the glycolytic pathway that supports cancerous growth.

=== Hypoxia Signaling Pathway ===
PFKFB3 expression is induced by hypoxia. The promoter of PFKFB3 contains binding sites, called hypoxia response elements (HREs), that recruit the binding of hypoxia-inducible factor-1 (HIF-1).

Hypoxia signaling via HIF-1α stabilization upregulates the transcription of genes that permit survival in low oxygen conditions. These genes include glycolysis enzymes, like PFKFB3, that permit ATP synthesis without oxygen, and vascular endothelial growth factor (VEGF), which promotes angiogenesis.

=== Cell Cycle & Apoptosis ===
It was more recently discovered that PFKFB3 promotes cell cycle progression (cell proliferation) and suppresses apoptosis by regulating cyclin-dependent kinase 1 (Cdk-1). PFKFB3's synthesis of F2,6BP in the nucleus was found to regulate Cdk-1, whereas cytosolic PFKFB3 activates PFK-1. Nuclear PFKFB3 activates Cdk1 to phosphorylate the Thr-187 site of p27, causing decreased levels of p27. Reduced p27 causes protection against apoptosis and progression of cells through the G1/S phase checkpoint These findings established a significant link between PFKFB3 cancer cell survival and proliferation.

=== Circadian Clock ===
Circadian clocks dysregulation is associated with many types of cancer. PFKFB3 expression exhibits circadian rhythmicity that is different between cancerous and non-cancerous cells. It was specifically found that the circadian-driven transcription factor 'CLOCK' binds to the PFKFB3 promoter at a genuine 'E-box' site to increase transcription in cancer cells.

- Inhibition of PFKFB3 using 3PO was successful in reducing cancer growth and increasing apoptosis, but only at certain time points within the circadian cycle. This finding highlights the need for time-based PFKFB3 inhibition in cancer treatment. The role of PFKFB3 inhibition in this process should now be considered taking recent information into account that 3PO was shown not to be a PFKFB3 inhibitor (3PO was inactive in a kinase PFKFB3 inhibition assay (IC50 > 100 μM)) (see the corresponding discussion in § Small molecule inhibitors of PFKFB3)

=== Additional Cancer Connections ===
- PFKFB3 is activated by progestins in breast cancer cells
- PFKFB3 promotes angiogenesis
  - Silencing of PFKFB3 impairs angiogenesis. PFKFB3-driven glycolysis overrules the pro-stalk activity of Notch. PFKFB3 regulates tip and stalk cell behavior and compartmentalizes with F-actin.

=== Anti-cancer Therapeutic Strategy ===
Inhibition of PFKFB3 is being analyzed as a potential anti-cancer therapy. The most notable example is clinical trial by Advanced Cancer Therapeutics (ACT) with PFK158, an improved version of 3PO, a PFKFB3 inhibitor. It appears, however, that further development has been discontinued following disappointing Phase I results (see also the discussion of ACT compounds in § Small molecule inhibitors of PFKFB3).

== Small molecule inhibitors of PFKFB3 ==
Several small-molecule inhibitors of PFKFB3 are currently in development.

For a long time a small molecule 3-(3-pyridinyl)-1-(4-pyridinyl)-2-propen-1-one (3PO) was believed to be an inhibitor of PFKFB3 and used as PFKFB3 inhibitor in many scientific publications. 3PO decreases glucose uptake and increases autophagy. Research is currently exploring various 3PO derivatives (i.e. PFKF15) in an effort to increase their efficacy as anti-cancer therapies, but the data on 3PO derivatives being actual PFKFB3 inhibitors are also unavailable.

Recent research of one of the leading pharmaceuticals companies AstraZeneca and CRT Discovery Laboratories of world's largest independent cancer research charity Cancer Research UK showed that 3PO was inactive in a kinase PFKFB3 inhibition assay (IC50 > 100 μM). The crystal structures of 3PO, as well as its analogues PFK15 and PFK158, with the PFKFB3 enzyme are also not available. The findings of AstraZeneca and Cancer Research UK regarding to 3PO remain unchallenged neither by 3PO developers since April 7, 2015.

The efficacy of two known PFKFB3 inhibitors, namely AZ67 (from AstraZeneca and CRT Discovery Laboratories), and PFK158, an improved but structurally close derivative of 3PO, were recently investigated for their ability to reduce F2,6BP production in A549 cells. Both compounds (AZ67 and PFK158) were able to reduce the cellular levels of F2,6BP in a dose-dependent manner, with IC50 of 0.51 μM and 5.90 μM, respectively. To see if the reduction of cellular F2,6BP levels was a result of direct PFKFB3 inhibition, both compounds were tried in the enzymatic cell-free assay. The study revealed that AZ67 inhibited the enzymatic activity of PFKFB3 with an IC50 of 0.018 μM, a value that is in accordance with previously published results. However, PFK158 had no effect on PFKFB3 enzymatic activity at any of the concentrations tested (up to 100 μM). Accordingly, although PFK158 is able to decrease F2,6BP and glycolytic flux, the experiments show that these effects are not due to PFKFB3 enzymatic inhibition.

Together, these findings put into question the range of scientific research and publications where 3PO and its derivatives (such as PFKF158) was used as a PFKFB3 inhibitor.

In 2018 Kancera reported development and characterization of KAN0438241 (and its pro-drug KAN0438757) as a potent and highly selective PFKFB3 inhibitor and a radiosensitizer.

== Other pathways involving PFKFB3 ==
=== Autophagy ===
Enhanced activity of PFKFB3 accelerates ROS production as an end product of glycolysis, and thus increases autophagy. Likewise, inhibition of PFKFB3 has been found to induce autophagy.

Autophagy can prolong cellular survival during low energy conditions. This finding was discovered in relation to rheumatoid arthritis. It was found that RA T cell fail to upregulate autophagy, and knockout experiments placed PFKFB3 as an upstream regulator of this process.

=== Insulin Signaling Pathway ===
PFKFB3 was identified in a kinome screen as a regulator of insulin/IGF-1. Suppression of PFKFB3 was found to decrease insulin-stimulated glucose uptake, GLUT4 translocation, and Akt signaling in 3T3-L1 adipocytes. Overexpression caused the insulin-dependent phosphorylation of Akt and Akt substrates.

PFKFB3 expression increases in fat tissues during adipogenesis, but prolonged insulin exposure has been shown to decrease the expression of PFKFB3. This is thought to occur due to a negative feedback mechanism involving insulin.

=== p38/MK2 Stress Signaling Pathway ===
p38 MAPK have been found to increase PFKFB3 activity through (1) the transcriptional activation of PFKFB3 in response to stress stimuli and (2) the post-translational phosphorylation of iPFK2 at Ser-461.
