= PFKFB1 =

Protein-coding gene in the species Homo sapiens

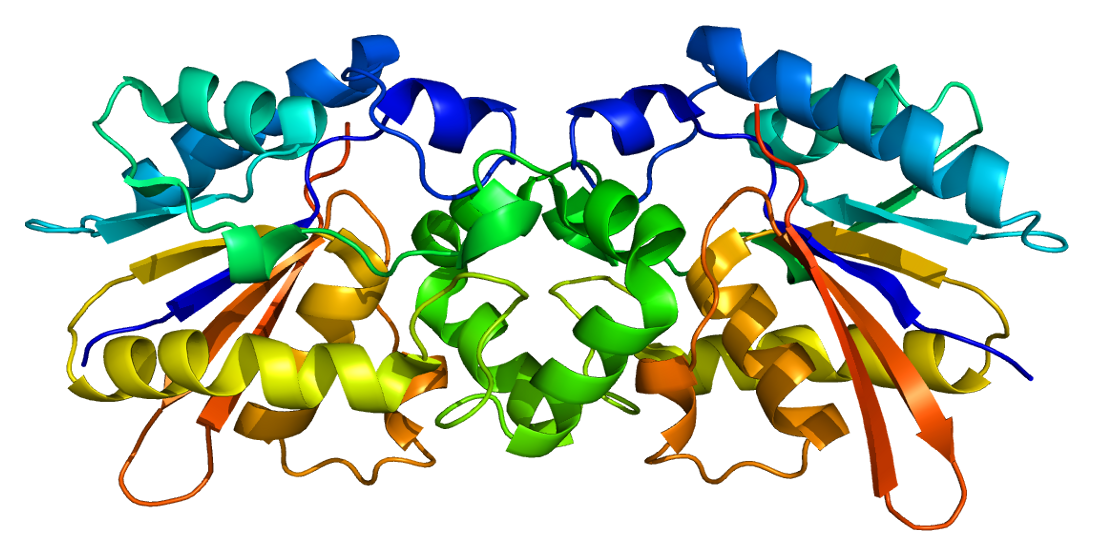

Identifiers
- Aliases: PFKFB1, F6PK, HL2K, PFRX, 6-phosphofructo-2-kinase/fructose-2,6-biphosphatase 1
- External IDs: OMIM: 311790; MGI: 107816; GeneCards: PFKFB1
Available structures
PDB	Ortholog search: PDBe RCSB
PDB	List of PDB id codes 1K6M
Enzyme activity
EC #	BRENDA	ExPASy	KEGG	MetaCyc
2.7.1.105	↗	↗	↗	↗
3.1.3.46	↗	↗	↗	↗

Gene location (Human)
Chr.	X chromosome (human)
Band	Xp11.21	Start	54,932,961 bp
Band	Xp11.21	End	54,998,534 bp

Gene location (Mouse)
Chr.	X chromosome (mouse)
Band	X|X F3	Start	149,371,225 bp
Band	X|X F3	End	149,426,874 bp
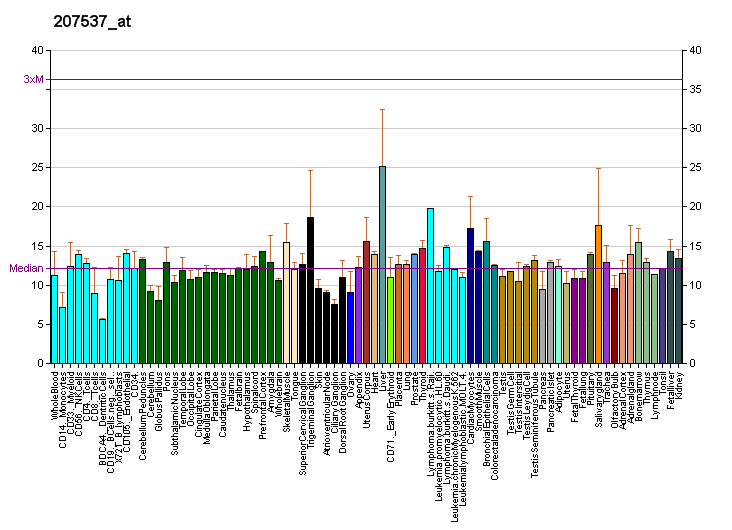
RNA expression pattern
Bgee	Human / Mouse (ortholog); Top expressed in: muscle of thigh; right lobe of liver; gastrocnemius muscle; Skeletal muscle tissue of rectus abdominis; gonad; vastus lateralis muscle; muscle of arm; biceps brachii; testicle; triceps brachii muscle / Top expressed in: muscle of thigh; sternocleidomastoid muscle; vastus lateralis muscle; triceps brachii muscle; masseter muscle; tibialis anterior muscle; temporal muscle; digastric muscle; gastrocnemius muscle; right ventricle; More reference expression data
BioGPS	More reference expression data
Gene ontology
Molecular function	transferase activity; nucleotide binding; fructose-6-phosphate binding; kinase activity; catalytic activity; protein binding; identical protein binding; fructose-2,6-bisphosphate 2-phosphatase activity; hydrolase activity; ATP binding; 6-phosphofructo-2-kinase activity; kinase binding
Cellular component	cytosol; 6-phosphofructo-2-kinase/fructose-2,6-biphosphatase complex
Biological process	gluconeogenesis; response to glucagon; glycolytic process; phosphorylation; fructose metabolic process; response to glucocorticoid; carbohydrate phosphorylation; response to insulin; positive regulation of glucokinase activity; fructose 2,6-bisphosphate metabolic process; animal organ regeneration; response to starvation; metabolism; response to cAMP; dephosphorylation; negative regulation of glycolytic process; positive regulation of glycolytic process
Sources:Amigo / QuickGO
Orthologs
Databases	NCBI: entry; OMA: entry
Species	Human	Mouse
Entrez	5207	18639
Ensembl	ENSG00000158571	ENSMUSG00000025271
UniProt	P16118	P70266
RefSeq (mRNA)	NM_001271804; NM_001271805; NM_002625	NM_008824; NM_001374170; NM_001374171; NM_001374172; NM_001374173 NM_001374175
RefSeq (protein)	NP_001258733; NP_001258734; NP_002616	NP_032850; NP_001361099; NP_001361100; NP_001361101; NP_001361102 NP_001361104
Location (UCSC)	Chr X: 54.93 – 55 Mb	Chr X: 149.37 – 149.43 Mb
PubMed search
- Wikidata
View/Edit Human	View/Edit Mouse

6-phosphofructo-2-kinase/fructose-2,6-biphosphatase 1 is an enzyme that in humans is encoded by the PFKFB1 gene.

This gene encodes a member of the family of bifunctional 6-phosphofructo-2-kinase:fructose-2,6-biphosphatase enzymes. The enzyme forms a homodimer that catalyzes both the synthesis and degradation of fructose-2,6-biphosphate using independent catalytic domains. Fructose-2,6-biphosphate is an activator of the glycolysis pathway and an inhibitor of the gluconeogenesis pathway. Consequently, regulating fructose-2,6-biphosphate levels through the activity of this enzyme is thought to regulate glucose homeostasis.
