= PFKFB2 =

Protein-coding gene in humans

Identifiers
- Aliases: PFKFB2, PFK-2/FBPase-2, 6-phosphofructo-2-kinase/fructose-2,6-biphosphatase 2
- External IDs: OMIM: 171835; MGI: 107815; GeneCards: PFKFB2
Enzyme activity
EC #	BRENDA	ExPASy	KEGG	MetaCyc
2.7.1.105	↗	↗	↗	↗
3.1.3.46	↗	↗	↗	↗

Gene location (Human)
Chr.	Chromosome 1 (human)
Band	1q32.1	Start	207,034,366 bp
Band	1q32.1	End	207,081,024 bp

Gene location (Mouse)
Chr.	Chromosome 1 (mouse)
Band	1|1 E4	Start	130,616,919 bp
Band	1|1 E4	End	130,656,990 bp
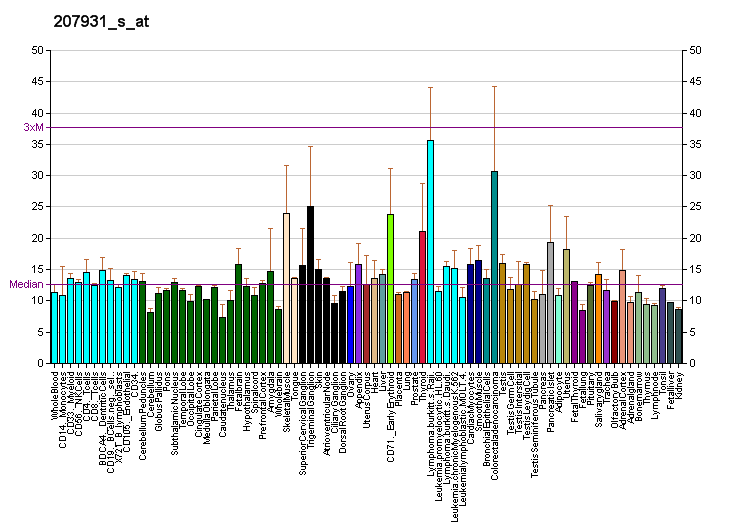

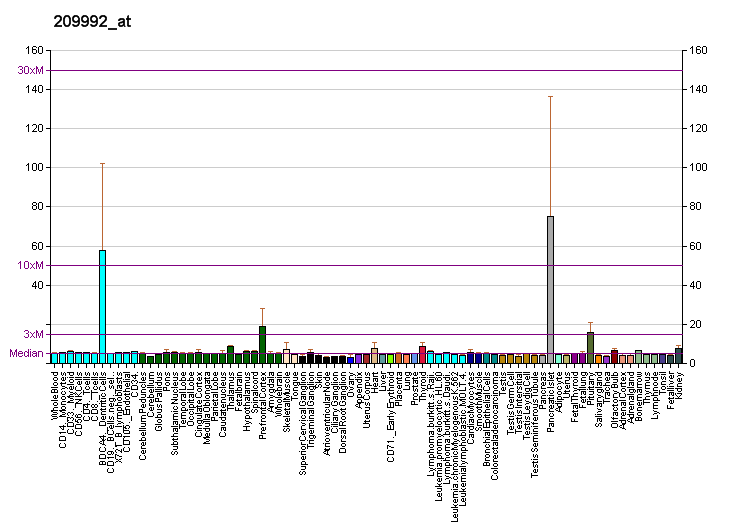
RNA expression pattern
Bgee	Human / Mouse (ortholog); Top expressed in: islet of Langerhans; oocyte; right lobe of thyroid gland; left lobe of thyroid gland; gastrocnemius muscle; rectum; apex of heart; duodenum; anterior pituitary; left ventricle / Top expressed in: neural layer of retina; spermatocyte; islet of Langerhans; spermatid; superior frontal gyrus; pineal gland; lumbar subsegment of spinal cord; cerebellar cortex; dentate gyrus of hippocampal formation granule cell; primary visual cortex; More reference expression data
BioGPS	More reference expression data
Gene ontology
Molecular function	transferase activity; nucleotide binding; kinase activity; protein binding; catalytic activity; fructose-2,6-bisphosphate 2-phosphatase activity; hydrolase activity; ATP binding; protein kinase binding; 6-phosphofructo-2-kinase activity; kinase binding
Cellular component	cytoplasm; cytosol; nucleus; nucleoplasm
Biological process	lactate metabolic process; glycolytic process; phosphorylation; fructose metabolic process; response to glucose; positive regulation of glucokinase activity; fructose 2,6-bisphosphate metabolic process; pyruvate metabolic process; glucose catabolic process; metabolism; positive regulation of insulin secretion; dephosphorylation; carbohydrate phosphorylation; positive regulation of glycolytic process
Sources:Amigo / QuickGO
Orthologs
Databases	NCBI: entry; OMA: entry
Species	Human	Mouse
Entrez	5208	18640
Ensembl	ENSG00000123836	ENSMUSG00000026409
UniProt	O60825	P70265
RefSeq (mRNA)	NM_001018053; NM_006212	NM_001162415; NM_001162416; NM_008825; NM_001368843
RefSeq (protein)	NP_001018063; NP_006203	NP_001155887; NP_001155888; NP_032851; NP_001355772
Location (UCSC)	Chr 1: 207.03 – 207.08 Mb	Chr 1: 130.62 – 130.66 Mb
PubMed search
- Wikidata
View/Edit Human	View/Edit Mouse

6-phosphofructo-2-kinase/fructose-2,6-biphosphatase 2 is an enzyme that in humans is encoded by the PFKFB2 gene.

The protein encoded by this gene is involved in both the synthesis and degradation of fructose-2,6-bisphosphate, a regulatory molecule that controls glycolysis in eukaryotes. The encoded protein has a 6-phosphofructo-2-kinase activity that catalyzes the synthesis of fructose-2,6-bisphosphate, and a fructose-2,6-biphosphatase activity that catalyzes the degradation of fructose-2,6-bisphosphate. This protein regulates fructose-2,6-bisphosphate levels in the heart, while a related enzyme encoded by a different gene regulates fructose-2,6-bisphosphate levels in the liver and muscle. This enzyme functions as a homodimer. Two transcript variants encoding two different isoforms have been found for this gene.

== Interactions ==
PFKFB2 has been shown to interact with YWHAQ.
