= Bisphosphate =

Bisphosphate may refer to the following enzymes and chemical compounds:

- (ribulose-bisphosphate carboxylase)-lysine N-methyltransferase (EC 2.1.1.127), an enzyme that catalyzes the chemical reaction S-adenosyl-L-methionine + [ribulose-1,5-bisphosphate carboxylase]-lysine S-adenosyl-L-homocysteine + [ribulose-1,5-bisphosphate carboxylase]-N6-methyl-L-lysine
- 3'(2'),5'-bisphosphate nucleotidase (EC 3.1.3.7), an enzyme that catalyzes the chemical reaction adenosine 3',5'-bisphosphate + H_{2}O adenosine 5'-phosphate + phosphate
- Fructose 1,6-bisphosphate, fructose sugar phosphorylated on carbons 1 and 6
- Fructose 2,6-bisphosphate (or fructose 2,6-diphosphate), abbreviated Fru-2,6-P2, a metabolite which allosterically affects the activity of the enzymes phosphofructokinase 1 (PFK-1) and fructose 1,6-bisphosphatase (FBPase-1) to regulate glycolysis and gluconeogenesis
- Fructose-2,6-bisphosphate 2-phosphatase (EC 3.1.3.46), an enzyme that catalyzes the chemical reaction beta-D-fructose 2,6-bisphosphate + H_{2}O D-fructose 6-phosphate + phosphate
- Fructose-2,6-bisphosphate 6-phosphatase (EC 3.1.3.54), an enzyme that catalyzes the chemical reaction beta-D-fructose 2,6-bisphosphate + H_{2}O beta-D-fructofuranose 2-phosphate + phosphate
- Glucose-1,6-bisphosphate synthase, a type of enzyme called a phosphotransferase and is involved in mammalian starch and sucrose metabolism
- Inositol-1,4-bisphosphate 1-phosphatase (EC 3.1.3.57), an enzyme that catalyzes the chemical reaction 1D-myo-inositol 1,4-bisphosphate + H_{2}O 1D-myo-inositol 4-phosphate + phosphate
- Phosphatidylinositol (3,4)-bisphosphate (PtdIns(3,4)P2), a minor phospholipid component of cell membranes, yet an important second messenger
- Phosphatidylinositol (3,5)-bisphosphate (PtdIns(3,5)P2), a minor phospholipid component of cell membranes, yet important in distinguishing cell compartments
- Phosphatidylinositol (4,5)-bisphosphate (PtdIns(4,5)P2), a minor phospholipid component of cell membranes
- Phosphatidylinositol-3,4-bisphosphate 4-phosphatase (EC 3.1.3.66), an enzyme that catalyzes the chemical reaction 1-phosphatidyl-myo-inositol 3,4-bisphosphate + H_{2}O 1-phosphatidyl-1D-myo-inositol 3-phosphate + phosphate
- Phosphatidylinositol-4,5-bisphosphate 3-kinase (EC 2.7.1.153), an enzyme that catalyzes the chemical reaction ATP + 1-phosphatidyl-1D-myo-inositol 4,5-bisphosphate ADP + 1-phosphatidyl-1D-myo-inositol 3,4,5-trisphosphate
- Ribose 1,5-bisphosphate phosphokinase (EC 2.7.4.23), an enzyme that catalyzes the chemical reaction ATP + ribose 1,5-bisphosphate ADP + 5-phospho-alpha-D-ribose 1-diphosphate
- Ribulose 1,5-bisphosphate (RuBP), an important substrate involved in carbon fixation
- Tagatose-bisphosphate aldolase (EC 4.1.2.40), an enzyme that catalyzes the chemical reaction D-tagatose 1,6-bisphosphate glycerone phosphate + D-glyceraldehyde 3-phosphate
