= Glucose-1-phosphate phosphotransferase =

Glucose-1-phosphate phosphotransferase may refer to the following enzymes:

- Riboflavin phosphotransferase
- Phosphoglucokinase
