= TP53-inducible glycolysis and apoptosis regulator =

Protein-coding gene in the species Homo sapiens

TIGAR

Identifiers
- Aliases: TIGAR, FR2BP, C12orf5, TP53 induced glycolysis regulatory phosphatase
- External IDs: OMIM: 610775; MGI: 2442752; GeneCards: TIGAR
Available structures
PDB	Ortholog search: PDBe RCSB
PDB	List of PDB id codes 3DCY
Enzyme activity
EC #	BRENDA	ExPASy	KEGG	MetaCyc
3.1.3.46	↗	↗	↗	↗

Gene location (Human)
Chr.	Chromosome 12 (human)
Band	12p13.32	Start	4,307,763 bp
Band	12p13.32	End	4,360,028 bp

Gene location (Mouse)
Chr.	Chromosome 6 (mouse)
Band	6|6 F3	Start	127,062,079 bp
Band	6|6 F3	End	127,086,520 bp
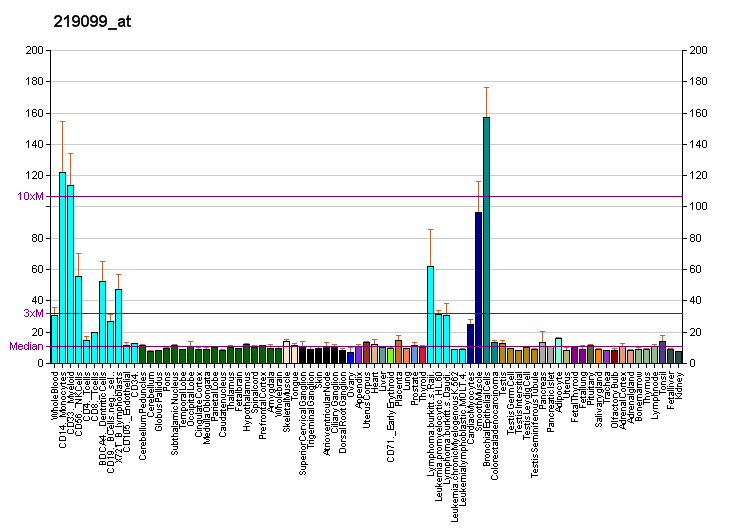
RNA expression pattern
Bgee	Human / Mouse (ortholog); Top expressed in: monocyte; stromal cell of endometrium; testicle; gonad; skeletal muscle tissue; gastrocnemius muscle; right adrenal cortex; granulocyte; placenta; islet of Langerhans / Top expressed in: knee joint; morula; substantia nigra; muscle of thigh; blastocyst; quadriceps femoris muscle; gastrocnemius muscle; skeletal muscle tissue; vastus lateralis muscle; medial head of gastrocnemius muscle; More reference expression data
BioGPS	More reference expression data
Gene ontology
Molecular function	protein binding; catalytic activity; bisphosphoglycerate 2-phosphatase activity; hydrolase activity; fructose-2,6-bisphosphate 2-phosphatase activity
Cellular component	cytoplasm; intracellular anatomical structure; mitochondrial outer membrane; mitochondrion; nucleus; cytosol
Biological process	regulation of response to DNA damage checkpoint signaling; negative regulation of glycolytic process; response to drug; intestinal epithelial cell development; positive regulation of cardiac muscle cell apoptotic process; positive regulation of DNA repair; negative regulation of glucose catabolic process to lactate via pyruvate; cellular response to DNA damage stimulus; fructose 1,6-bisphosphate metabolic process; autophagy; negative regulation of mitophagy; cellular response to cobalt ion; response to ischemia; fructose 2,6-bisphosphate metabolic process; regulation of pentose-phosphate shunt; negative regulation of programmed cell death; negative regulation of reactive oxygen species metabolic process; metabolism; response to gamma radiation; cellular response to hypoxia; positive regulation of hexokinase activity; negative regulation of neuron death; apoptotic process; dephosphorylation
Sources:Amigo / QuickGO
Orthologs
Databases	NCBI: entry; OMA: entry
Species	Human	Mouse
Entrez	57103	319801
Ensembl	ENSG00000078237	ENSMUSG00000038028
UniProt	Q9NQ88	Q8BZA9
RefSeq (mRNA)	NM_020375	NM_177003
RefSeq (protein)	NP_065108	NP_795977
Location (UCSC)	Chr 12: 4.31 – 4.36 Mb	Chr 6: 127.06 – 127.09 Mb
PubMed search
- Wikidata
View/Edit Human	View/Edit Mouse

The TP53-inducible glycolysis and apoptosis regulator (TIGAR) also known as fructose-2,6-bisphosphatase TIGAR is an enzyme that in humans is encoded by the TIGAR gene (previously C12orf5).

TIGAR is a recently discovered enzyme that primarily functions as a regulator of glucose breakdown in human cells. In addition to its role in controlling glucose degradation, TIGAR activity can allow a cell to carry out DNA repair, and the degradation of its own organelles. Finally, TIGAR can protect a cell from death. Since its discovery in 2005 by Kuang-Yu Jen and Vivian G. Cheung, TIGAR has become of particular interest to the scientific community thanks to its active role in many cancers. Normally, TIGAR manufactured by the body is activated by the p53 tumour suppressor protein after a cell has experienced a low level of DNA damage or stress. In some cancers, TIGAR has fallen under the control of other proteins. The hope is that future research into TIGAR will provide insight into new ways to treat cancer.

This gene is regulated as part of the p53 tumor suppressor pathway and encodes a protein with sequence similarity to the bisphosphate domain of the glycolytic enzyme that degrades fructose-2,6-bisphosphate. The protein functions by blocking glycolysis and directing the pathway into the pentose phosphate shunt. Expression of this protein also protects cells from DNA damaging reactive oxygen species and provides some protection from DNA damage-induced apoptosis. The 12p13.32 region that includes this gene is paralogous to the 11q13.3 region.

== Gene ==
In humans the TIGAR gene, known as C12orf5, is found on chromosome 12p13-3, and consists of 6 exons. The C12orf5 mRNA is 8237 base pairs in length.

== Discovery ==
Jen and Cheung first discovered the c12orf5 gene whilst using computer based searches to find novel p53-regulated genes that were switched on in response to ionizing radiation. They published their research in Cancer Research in 2005.

Later a study focused wholly on the structure and function of the c12orf5 gene was published in Cell by Karim Bensaad et al., in which c12orf5 was given the name TIGAR in honour of its apparent function.

== Expression ==
TIGAR transcription is rapidly activated by the p53 tumour suppressor protein in response to low levels of cellular stress, such as that caused by exposure to low doses of UV. However, under high levels of cellular stress TIGAR expression decreases. P53, a transcription factor, can bind two sites within the human TIGAR gene to activate expression. One site is found within the first intron, and binds p53 with high affinity. The second is found just prior to the first exon, binds p53 with low affinity, and is conserved between mice and humans. TIGAR expression can be regulated by other non-p53 mechanisms in tumour cell lines.

== Structure ==
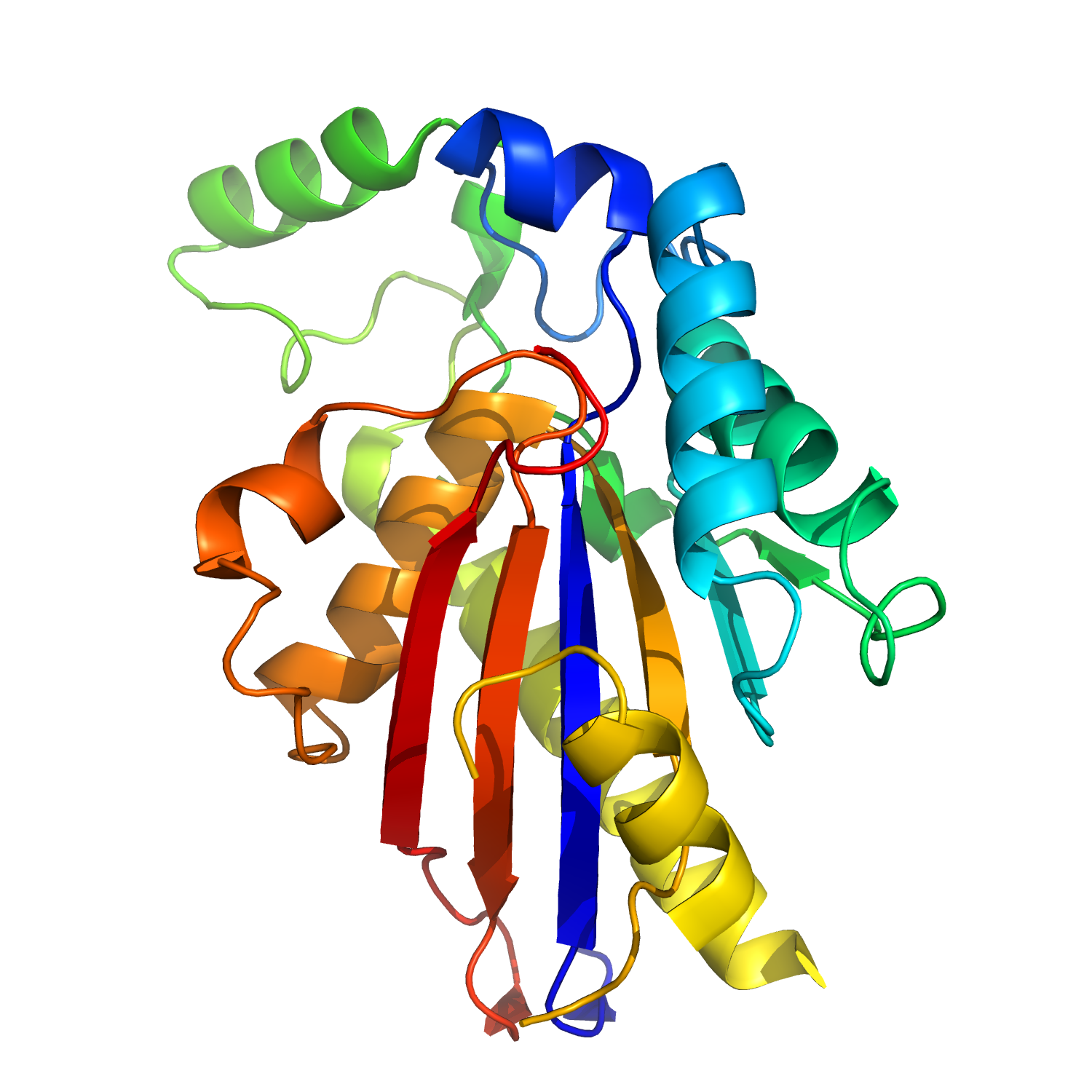
A cartoon of the tertiary structure of TIGAR.

TIGAR is approximately 30kDa and has a tertiary structure that is similar to the histidine phosphatase fold. The core of TIGAR is made up of an α-β-α sandwich, which consists of a six-stranded β sheet surrounded by 4 α helices. Additional α helices and a long loop are built around the core to give the full enzyme. TIGAR has an active site that is structurally similar to that of PhoE (a bacterial phosphatase enzyme) and functionally similar to that of fructose-2,6-bisphosphatase.

The bis-phosphatase-like active site of TIGAR is positively charged, and catalyses the removal of phosphate groups from other molecules. In contrast to Fructose-2,6-Bisphosphatase, TIGAR's active site is open and accessible like that of PhoE. The site contains 3 crucial amino acids (2 histidines and 1 glutamic acid) that are involved in the phosphatase reaction. These 3 residues are known collectively as a catalytic triad, and are found in all enzymes belonging to the phosphoglyceromutase branch of the histidine phosphatase superfamily. One of the histidine residues is electrostatically bound to a negatively charged phosphate. A second phosphate is bound elsewhere in the active site.

== Function ==
TIGAR activity can have multiple cellular effects. TIGAR acts as a direct regulator of fructose-2,6-bisphosphate levels and hexokinase 2 activity, and this can lead indirectly to many changes within the cell in a chain of biochemical events. TIGAR is a fructose bisphosphatase which activates p53, in results of inhibiting the expression of glucose transporter and also regulating the expression of hexokinase and phosphoglycerate mutase. TIGAR also inhibit the Phosphofructokinase (PFK) by lowering the level of fructose-2,6,bisphosphate, therefore, glycolysis is inhibited and pentose phosphate pathway is promoted.

=== Fructose-2,6-bisphosphate regulation ===
TIGAR decreases cellular fructose-2,6-bisphosphate levels. It catalyses the removal of a phosphate group from fructose-2,6-bisphosphate (F-2,6-BP): Fructose-2,6-Bisphosphate->Fructose-6-phosphate (F-6-P) + phosphate

F-2,6-BP is an allosteric regulator of cellular glucose metabolism pathways. Ordinarily F-2,6-BP binds to and increases the activity of phosphofructokinase 1. Phosphofructokinase-1 catalyses the addition of a phosphate to F-6-P to form Fructose-1,6-bisphosphate (F-1,6-BP). This is an essential step in the glycolysis pathway, which forms the first part of aerobic respiration in mammals. F-2,6-BP also binds to and decreases the activity of fructose-1,6-bisphosphatase. Fructose-1,6-bisphosphatase catalyses the removal of phosphate from F-1,6-BP to form F-6-P. This reaction is part of the gluconeogenesis pathway, which synthesizes glucose, and is the reverse of glycolysis. When TIGAR decreases F-2,6-BP levels, phosphofructokinase becomes less active whilst fructose-1,6-bisphosphatase activity increases. Fructose-6-phosphate levels build up, which has multiple effects inside the cell:

- The rate of glycolysis decreases
- The rate of gluconeogenesis increases
- Excess fructose-6-phosphate is converted to glucose-6-phosphate in an isomerization reaction
- Excess glucose-6-phosphate enters the pentose phosphate pathway. This ultimately leads to the removal of reactive oxygen species (ROS) in the cell
- The removal of ROS helps to prevent apoptosis (cell suicide), and may also reduce build-up of DNA damage over time.

=== DNA damage response and cell cycle arrest ===
TIGAR can act to prevent a cell progressing through the stages of its growth and division cycle by decreasing cellular ATP levels. This is known as cell cycle arrest. This function of TIGAR forms part of the p53 mediated DNA damage response where, under low levels of cellular stress, p53 initiates cell cycle arrest to allow the cell time for repair. Under high levels of cellular stress, p53 initiates apoptosis instead.

In non-resting cells, the cell cycle consists of G0 -> G1 -> S -> G2 -> M phases, and is tightly regulated at checkpoints between the phases. If the cell has undergone stress, certain proteins are expressed that will prevent the specific sequence of macromolecular interactions at the checkpoint required for progression to the next phase.

TIGAR activity can prevent cells progressing into S phase through a checkpoint known in humans as the restriction point. At the very start of G1 phase, a protein called retinoblastoma (Rb) exists in an un-phosphorylated state. In this state, Rb binds to a protein transcription factor E2F and prevents E2F from activating transcription of proteins essential for S-phase. During a normal cell cycle, as G1 progresses, Rb will become phosphorylated in a specific set of sequential steps by proteins called cyclin dependent kinases (cdks) bound to cyclin proteins. The specific complexes that phosphorylate Rb are cyclin D-cdk4 and cyclin E-cdk2.

When Rb has been phosphorylated many times, it dissociates from E2F. E2F is free to activate expression of S-phase genes. TIGAR can indirectly prevent a cell passing through the Restriction Point by keeping Rb unphosphorylated.

When expressed, TIGAR decreases cellular ATP levels through its phosphatase activity. Less ATP is available for Rb phosphorylation, so Rb remains un-phosphorylated and bound to E2F, which cannot activate S phase genes. Expression of cyclin D, ckd4, cyclin E and cdk2 decreases when TIGAR is active, due to a lack of ATP essential for their transcription and translation. This TIGAR activity serves to arrest cells in G1.

=== Activity of hexokinase 2 ===
Under low oxygen conditions known as hypoxia, a small amount of TIGAR travels to the mitochondria and increases the activity of Hexokinase 2 (HK2) by binding to it

During hypoxia, a protein called Hif1α is activated and causes TIGAR to re-localise from the cytoplasm to the outer mitochondrial membrane. Here, HK2 is bound to an anion channel in the outer mitochondrial membrane called VDAC. TIGAR binds hexokinase 2 and increases its activity by an as yet unknown mechanism.

Hexokinase 2 (HK2) carries out the following reaction:

Glucose + ATP -> Glucose-6-phosphate + ADP

HK2 is believed to maintain the mitochondrial membrane potential by keeping ADP levels high. It also prevents apoptosis in several ways: it reduces mitochondrial ROS levels, and it prevents apoptosis-causing protein Bax from creating a channel with VDAC. This stops cytochrome C protein passing out through VDAC into the cytoplasm where it triggers apoptosis via a caspase protein cascade.

TIGAR does not re-localise to the mitochondria and bind HK2 under normal cellular conditions, or if the cell is starved of glucose. Re-localisation to the mitochondria does not require TIGAR's phosphatase domain. Instead 4 amino acids at the C-terminal end of TIGAR are essential.

=== Protection from apoptosis ===
Increased expression of TIGAR protects cells from oxidative-stress induced apoptosis by decreasing the levels of ROS. TIGAR can indirectly reduce ROS in two distinctive ways. The intracellular environment of the cell will determine which of these two modes of TIGAR action is more prevalent in the cell at any one time.

The fructose-2,6-bisphosphatase activity of TIGAR reduces ROS by increasing the activity of the Pentose Phosphate Pathway (PPP). Glucose-6-phosphate builds up due to de-phosphorylation of F-2,6-BP by TIGAR and enters the PPP. This causes the PPP to generate more nicotinamide adenine dinucleotide (NADPH). NADPH is a carrier of electrons that is used by the cell as a reducing agent in many anabolic reactions. NADPH produced by the PPP passes electrons to an oxidized glutathione molecule (GSSG) to form reduced glutathione (GSH).

GSH becomes the reducing agent, and passes electrons on to the ROS hydrogen peroxide to form harmless water in the reaction:

GSH + H_{2}O_{2} -> H_{2}O + GSSG

The decrease in H_{2}O_{2} as a result of TIGAR activity protects against apoptosis.

TIGAR also reduces ROS by increasing the activity of HK2. HK2 reduces ROS levels indirectly by keeping ADP levels at the outer mitochondrial membrane high. If ADP levels fall, the rate of respiration decreases and causes the electron transport chain to become over-reduced with excess electrons. These excess electrons pass to oxygen and form ROS.

The action of the TIGAR/HK2 complex only protects cells from apoptosis under low oxygen conditions. Under normal or glucose starved conditions, TIGAR mediated protection from apoptosis comes from its bis-phosphatase activity alone.

TIGAR cannot prevent apoptosis via death pathways that are independent from ROS and p53. In some cells, TIGAR expression can push cells further towards apoptosis.

Interleukin 3 (IL-3) is a growth factor that can bind to receptors on a cell's surface and tells the cell to survive and grow. When IL-3 dependent cell lines are deprived of IL-3 they die due to decreased uptake and metabolism of glucose. When TIGAR is overexpressed in IL-3 deprived cells the rate of glycolysis decreases further which enhances the apoptosis rate.

=== Autophagy ===
Autophagy is when a cell digests some of its own organelles by lysosomal degradation. Autophagy is employed to remove damaged organelles, or under starvation conditions to provide additional nutrients. Normally, autophagy occurs by the TSC-Mtor pathway, but can be induced by ROS. TIGAR, even at very low levels, inhibits autophagy by decreasing ROS levels. The mechanism by which TIGAR does this is independent from the Mtor pathway, but the exact details are unknown.

== Possible roles in cancer ==
TIGAR can promote development or inhibition of several cancers depending on the cellular context. TIGAR can have some effect on three characteristics of cancer; the ability to evade apoptosis, uncontrolled cell division, and altered metabolism. Many cancer cells have altered metabolism where the rate of glycolysis and anaerobic respiration are very high whilst oxidative respiration is low, which is called the Warburg Effect (or aerobic glycolysis). This allows cancer cells to survive under low oxygen conditions, and use molecules from respiratory pathways to synthesise amino acids and nucleic acids to maintain rapid growth.

In Glioma, a type of brain cancer, TIGAR can be over-expressed where it has oncogenic-like effects. In this case, TIGAR acts to maintain energy levels for increased growth by increasing respiration (conferring altered metabolism), and also protects glioma cells against hypoxia-induced apoptosis by decreasing ROS (conferring evasion of apoptosis). TIGAR is also overexpressed in some breast cancers.

In multiple myeloma, TIGAR expression is linked to the activity of MUC-1. MUC-1 is an oncoprotein that is overexpressed in multiple myeloma and protects these cells from ROS-induced apoptosis by maintaining TIGAR activity. When MUC-1 activity is removed, levels of TIGAR decline and cells undergo ROS-induced apoptosis.

In a type of head and neck cancer known as nasopharyngeal cancer, the onco-protein kinase c-Met maintains TIGAR expression. TIGAR increases glycolytic rate and NADPH levels which allows the cancer cells to maintain fast growth rates.

However, TIGAR may also have an inhibitory effect on cancer development by preventing cellular proliferation through its role in p53 -mediated cell cycle arrest.

The study on TIGAR highlighted that inhibiting TIGAR could disrupt the metabolic adaptations of cancer cells by increasing levels of fructose-2,6-bisphosphate (F26BP). This change affects glycolysis and the pentose phosphate pathway, potentially restoring apoptosis and reducing tumor resistance to treatments.
