= GTP:GTP guanylyltransferase =

GTP:GTP guanylyltransferase may refer to:

- Guanosine-triphosphate guanylyltransferase, enzyme
- Diguanylate cyclase, enzyme
