= C6H14O12P2 =

The molecular formula C_{6}H_{14}O_{12}P_{2} (molar mass: 340.12 g/mol) may refer to:

- Fructose 1,6-bisphosphate
- Fructose 2,6-bisphosphate
- Glucose 1,6-bisphosphate
