= CXorf49C =

Protein-coding gene in humans

Identifiers
- Aliases: CXorf49C, chromosome X open reading frame 49-like, LOC101059915
- External IDs: GeneCards: CXorf49C

Gene location (Human)
Chr.	X chromosome (human)
Band	Xq13.1	Start	71,667,542 bp
Band	Xq13.1	End	71,671,524 bp
RNA expression pattern
Bgee	Human / Mouse (ortholog); Top expressed in: gonad; testicle; right testis; left testis; superior frontal gyrus; Brodmann area 9; anterior cingulate cortex; right frontal lobe; prefrontal cortex; amygdala / n/a; More reference expression data
BioGPS	n/a
Orthologs
Databases	NCBI: entry; OMA: entry
Species	Human	Mouse
Entrez	101059915	n/a
Ensembl	ENSG00000283599	n/a
UniProt	n a	n/a
RefSeq (mRNA)	NM_001323075	n/a
RefSeq (protein)	n/a	n/a
Location (UCSC)	Chr X: 71.67 – 71.67 Mb	n/a
PubMed search		n/a
- Wikidata
View/Edit Human

Uncharacterized protein CXorf49C is a protein that in humans is encoded by the gene CXorf49C (previously LOC101059915). It is located on the X chromosome and has restricted expression in the testis.

== Gene ==
The LOC101059915 gene has two aliases known as chromosome X open reading frame 49-like and BX276092.6.

=== Locus and Structure ===
LOC101059915 is located on the X chromosome at locus Xq13.1. It is 1,831 base pairs long and the gene sequence has 6 exons. LOC101059915 also has one protein coding transcript.

=== Promoter Region and Expression ===
The promoter region of LOC101059915 is located on the sense strand of DNA, and between base pair 71666098 and 71667904 on the X chromosome. It spans up to 1.806 bp. Expression of LOC101059915, however, is relatively low in human cells, and is primarily limited to the testis.

== Protein ==
=== General Features and Compositional Analysis ===
The protein has 518 amino acids and a molecular mass of 55.1 kDa. The isoelectric point is 8.15. Compared to other human proteins LOC101059915 is glycine-, proline-rich, and serine-rich but the protein has lower levels of tyrosine.

=== Domains ===
The domain of unknown function, DUF4641 covers almost the entire protein. It is a part of pfam15483. It is 410 amino acids long, from amino acid 85 until amino acid number 495.

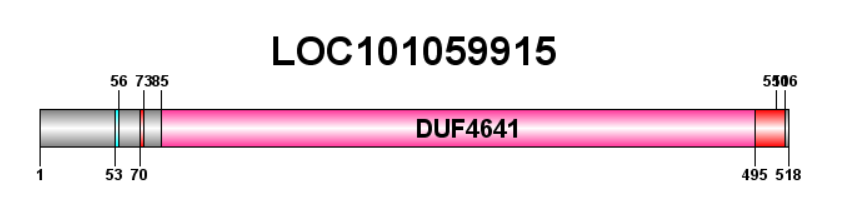
Schematic illustration made using DOG software showing the domain of unknown function (DUF4641) as well as the location of secondary structures such as alpha helices, and post-translation modifications such as SUMO sites.

=== Secondary Structure ===
The secondary structure of LOC101059915 has been shown to consist of primarily alpha helices as determined by models made on I-TASSER and analysis using ExPASy tools.

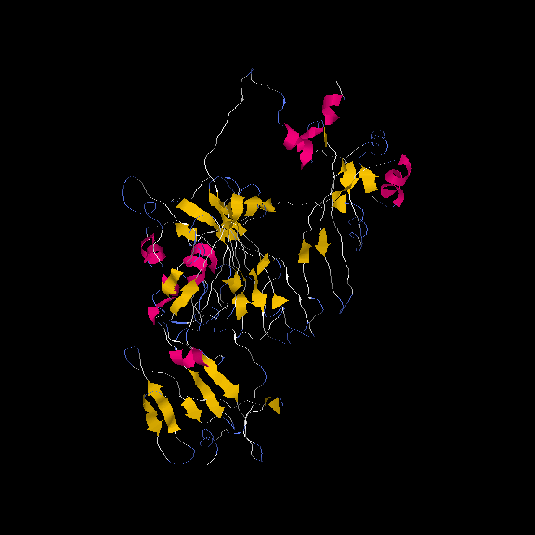
Displays the modeled secondary structures of LOC101059915 with the red indicating alpha helices, and the yellow indicating possible beta sheets.

=== Post-translation modifications ===
LOC101055915 is predicted to contain many different post-translational modifications. This include sites for phosphorylation (NetPhos 2.0) and sumoylation (SUMOplot Analysis Program).

=== Subcellular localization ===
The LOC101059915 protein has been predicted to be located in the cell nucleus (PSORT II).

== Homology and Evolution ==
=== Paralogs ===
CXorf49 and CXorf49B are paralogs of LOC101059915. They share upwards of 78% similarity with LOC101059915 and likely went through a gene duplication event relatively recently, in evolutionary terms, due to the high degree of conservation between all three sequences.

CXorf49 is especially interesting due it being shown to be involved as one of the components of a small group of the HL-60 cell proteome that are most prone to form 4-Hydroxy-2-nonenal(HNE) adducts, upon exposure to nontoxic (10 μM) HNE concentrations, along with heat shock 60 kDa protein 1.

=== Orthologs ===
Using BLAST no orthologs for LOC101059915 are found in single celled organisms, fungi or plants whose genomes have been sequenced. For multi-cellular organisms, orthologs are found in mammals, excluding Monotremes. The table below shows a representative sample of 20 of the orthologs for LOC101059915. The table is organized based on the time of divergence from humans in millions of years (MYA). In cases where the divergence time-frame is the same the orthologs are sorted by identity (%).

Genus and species name	Common name	Divergence from Human Lineage (MYA)	Accession number	Sequence length (aa)	Sequence identity to human protein	Sequence similarity to Human Protein
Pan paniscus	Chimpanzee	6.65	XP_003820175.1	518	97%	97%
Papio anubis	Olive Baboon	29.4	XP_003919408.1	514	70 %	77%
Piliocolobus tephrosceles	Ugandan Red Colobus	29.4	XP_023050488.1	514	68 %	76%
Cebus capucinus imitator	White-Headed Capuchin	43	XP_017372264.1	472	68 %	72%
Callithrix jacchus	Common Marmoset	43	XP_008987720.1	474	67%	72%
Aotus nancymaae	Nancy Ma's Night Monkey	43	XP_010822786.1	432	63%	66%
Saimiri boliviensis boliviensis	Black-capped Squirrel Monkey	43	XP_003944512.1	521	58%	68%
Rattus norvegicus	Brown Rat	90	XP_008756683.2	136	46%	55%
Ictidomys tridecemlineatus	Thirteen-Lined Ground Squirrel	90	XP_021576972.1	565	45%	57%
Canis lupus familiaris	Dog	96	XP_850392.2	526	52%	64%
Panthera pardus	Leopard	96	XP_019284263.1	472	47%	58%
Enhydra lutris kenyoni	Sea Otter	96	XP_022348355.1	495	47%	59%
Ovis aries musimon	Mouflon	96	XP_01208848.1	539	45%	56%
Capra hircus	Goat	96	XP_017899210.1	538	44%	55%
Pantholops hodgsonii	Tibetan Antelope	96	XP_005965061.1	533	44%	55%
Myotis lucifugus	Little brown bat	96	XP_006083036.1	500	42 %	55%
Trichechus manatus latirostris	Florida manatee	105	XP_012415455.1	505	44%	55%
Orycteropus afer afer	Aardvark	105	XP_007957133.1	477	39%	50%
Phascolarctos cinereus	Koala	159	XP_020834608.1	474	37%	50%
Sarcophilus harrisii	Tasmanian Devil	159	XP_023362890.1	576	33%	50%

=== Phylogeny ===
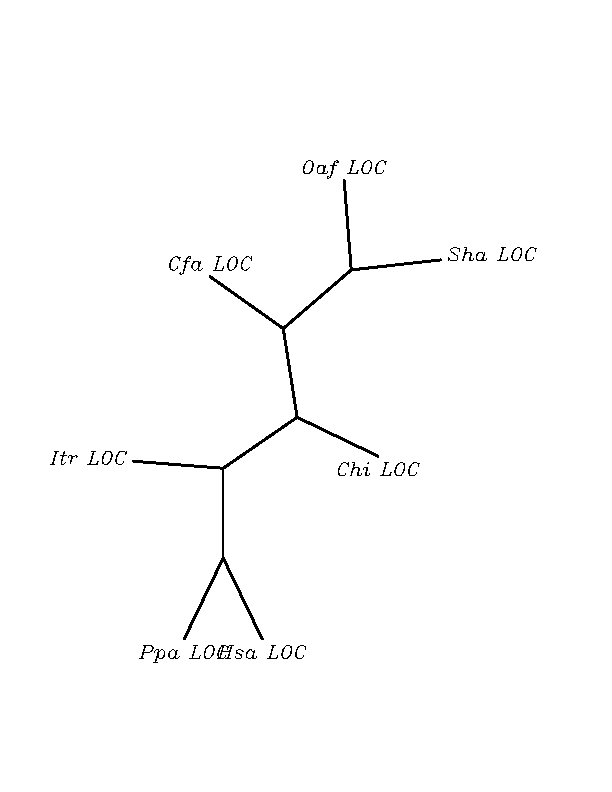
Shows the unrooted branching of select orthologs for LOC10105519.

The most distant ortholog for LOC101059915 is from the species Sarcrophilus harrisii which is commonly known as the Tasmanian Devil dating from more than 159.0 million years ago.
