= CHASE domain =

Extracellular protein domain

CHASE

Identifiers
- Symbol: CHASE
- Pfam: PF03924
- InterPro: IPR006189
Available protein structures:
- PDB: IPR006189 PF03924 (ECOD; PDBsum)
- AlphaFold: IPR006189; PF03924

The CHASE domain is an extracellular protein domain, which is found in transmembrane receptor from bacteria, lower eukaryotes and plants. It has been named CHASE (Cyclases/Histidine kinases Associated Sensory Extracellular) because of its presence in diverse receptor-like proteins with histidine kinase and nucleotide cyclase domains. The CHASE domain is 200-230 amino acids long and always occurs N-terminally in extracellular or periplasmic locations, followed by an intracellular tail housing diverse enzymatic signalling domains such as histidine kinase, adenyl cyclase, GGDEF-type nucleotide cyclase and EAL-type phosphodiesterase domains, as well as non-enzymatic domains such PAS, GAF, phosphohistidine and response regulatory domains. The CHASE domain is predicted to bind diverse low molecular weight ligands, such as the cytokinin-like adenine derivatives or peptides, and mediate signal transduction through the respective receptors.

The CHASE domain has a predicted alpha+beta fold, with two extended alpha helices on both boundaries and two central alpha helices separated by beta sheets. The termini are less conserved compared with the central part of the domain, which shows strongly conserved motif.
