= RpfG RNA motif =

rpfG
- Consensus secondary structure and sequence conservation of rpfG RNA

Identifiers
- Symbol: rpfG
- Rfam: RF03023

Other data
- RNA type: Gene; sRNA
- SO: SO:0001263
- PDB structures: PDBe

The rpfG RNA motif is a conserved RNA structure that was discovered by bioinformatics. The rpfG RNA motif is found in the genus Xanthomonas.

rpfG RNAs are located upstream of rpfG genes, which likely function as part of cyclic di-GMP signaling by degrading this molecule. This observation might suggest that rpfG RNAs function as cis-regulatory elements.
