= Jakub Paś =

Polish scientist and entrepreneur (born 1977)

- Born: 27 September 1977 (age 48); Śrem, Poland
- Education: Adam Mickiewicz University in Poznań
- Scientific career
- Fields: Chemistry; Computer Science; Bioinformatics
- Thesis: Application and implementation of probabilistic profile-profile comparison methods for protein fold recognition (2013)

Jakub Paś (born 27 September 1977) is a Polish scientist and developer. He is a doctor of chemistry at the Faculty of Chemistry of Adam Mickiewicz University in Poznań.

== Early years ==
Paś was born in 1977 in Śrem. He attended No. 4 Primary School in Śrem and the Józef Wybicki High School in Śrem; at that time, he succeeded as a laureate of Polish Mathematics Olympiad. In 2001, he was awarded the MSc in Biotechnology title at the Faculty of Biochemistry of Adam Mickiewicz University in Poznań; his thesis Sequential and structural analysis of proteins related to the BcFA (methyl branched-chain fatty acids), supervised by Leszek Rychlewski, was awarded distinction in of that year. In 2013, he defended his PhD thesis in chemistry, Application and implementation of probabilistic profile-profile comparison methods for protein fold recognition (under the supervision of Marcin Hoffmann). He also completed IT Project Management postgradual study on WSB School of Banking Poznań with thesis Transformation of the IT department and change of the technological process while maintaining the continuity of the product

== Academic career ==
Already during his MSc course, Paś took an Socrates-Erasmus internship at the University Of Edinburgh under Lucy A Harrier supervision worked on bioinformatics project explaining genomics of arbuscular mycorrhizal fungi. During his master's Paś worked on REFLAX European project (for Rational Engineering of FLAX) that aimed at the integration of metabolic, physiological, molecular biological, genetical, structural biological, proteomics and bioinformatics studies to provide a basis for the rational engineering of oilseeds towards the production of BcFAs. Part of that research was included in his MSc thesis. Upon receiving his PhD degree, he was employed as research scientist in Bioinfobank Institute, Sanford Burnham Prebys Medical Discovery Institute and Howard Hughes Medical Institute. He also worked on fellowship in Max Planck Institute for Molecular Genetics and University of Catania. In 2007, Paś was granted Marie Curie Fellowship at Politehnica University of Bucharest where he received International Supercomputing Conference Poster Award for work GPGPU Accelerated Sparse Linear Solver for Fast Simulation of On-Chip Coupled Problems. In 2009 he received Marie Curie Reintegration Grant. As of 2018, Jakub Paś is employed at GSK plc.

=== Scientific activity ===
Paś research focuses on the application of computational methods for protein structure prediction, fold recognition and phylogeny, investigation of the structure of molecules and the interactions between them. During his work in Bioinfobank Institute Jakub Paś was involved in multiple European project such as ELM, SEPSDA, NARCISUS, DATAGENOME or BIOSAPIENS. His applied work focuses on automation in pharmaceutical research, Continuous Integration / Continuous Development (CI/CD) and test automation in highly regulated industry. The results of his scientific research include:

- Explanation of the mechanism of interaction between SARS coronavirus helicase/ATPase and ATP and design of potential inhibitors of this enzyme.
- ELM: the status of the 2010 eukaryotic linear motif
- ORFeus: detection of distant homology using sequence profiles and predicted secondary structure
- Molecular phylogenetics of the RrmJ/fibrillarin superfamily of ribose 2'-O-methyltransferases
- Ligand. Info small-molecule meta-database
- Application of 3D-Jury, GRDB, and Verify3D in fold recognition
- Ligand-Info, searching for similar small compounds using index profiles
- Structure prediction, evolution and ligand interaction of CHASE domain
- Lead toxicity through the leadzyme
- Comparison of proteins based on segments structural similarity
- How unique is the rice transcriptome?
- Leadzyme formed in vivo interferes with tobacco mosaic virus infection in Nicotiana tabacum
- 3D-Hit: fast structural comparison of proteins
- The PDB-Preview database: a repository of in-silico models of ‘on-hold’PDB entries
- Two sequences encoding chalcone synthase in yellow lupin (Lupinus luteus l.) may have evolved by gene duplication
- GRDB - Gene Relational DataBase
- Application and implementation of probabilistic profile-profile comparison methods for protein fold recognition

These and other studies resulted in authorship and co-authorship of ca. 20 publications (21 according to Google Scholar), including highly prestigious scientific journals, such as Science, Nucleic Acid Research and Gene. His papers are increasingly cited year after year (totalling 1050 - Google Scholar), which yields 11 citations per publication and the h-index of 11.

=== Educational activity ===
Since 2002, Paś has been actively training phylogeny and bioinformatics. He was also leading course molecular modeling and prediction of spatial structure of proteins. In 2004, Paś was leading Summer modeling school at Laboratory of Bioinformatics, Institute of Physics on Adam Mickiewicz University.

=== Other activities ===
Jakub Paś is currently working as Principal Automation Engineer in GSK plc. He is involved in open source software development and organizing Linux user group meetings. He is also a member of Project Management Institute and author of articles about contemporary music.
