= Glucose-1-phosphate phosphodismutase =

Identifiers
- EC no.: 2.7.1.41
- CAS no.: 9026-25-9

Databases
- IntEnz: IntEnz view
- BRENDA: BRENDA entry
- ExPASy: NiceZyme view
- KEGG: KEGG entry
- MetaCyc: metabolic pathway
- PRIAM: profile
- PDB structures: RCSB PDB PDBe PDBsum
- Gene Ontology: AmiGO / QuickGO
Search
- PMC: articles
- PubMed: articles
- NCBI: proteins

Glucose-1-phosphate phosphodismutase (EC 2.7.1.41) is an enzyme that catalyzes the chemical reaction

2
glucose 1-phosphate
D-glucose
+
glucose 1,6-bisphosphate

This enzyme characterised from Escherichia coli and rabbit muscle converts two molecules of glucose 1-phosphate into one of glucose and one of glucose 1,6-bisphosphate.

This enzyme is a type of transferase, specifically one transferring phosphorus-containing groups (phosphotransferases) with an alcohol group as acceptor. The systematic name of this enzyme class is D-glucose-1-phosphate:D-glucose-1-phosphate 6-phosphotransferase. It participates in starch and sucrose metabolism.
