= Fructose-2,6-bisphosphate 6-phosphatase =

Class of enzymes

fructose-2,6-bisphosphate 6-phosphatase

Identifiers
- EC no.: 3.1.3.54
- CAS no.: 111684-53-8

Databases
- BRENDA: enzyme data
- ExPASy: NiceZyme view
- KEGG: enzyme entry
- MetaCyc: metabolic pathway
- Rhea: reactions
- PDB structures: RCSB PDB PDBe PDBsum
- Gene Ontology: AmiGO / QuickGO
Search
- PMC: articles
- PubMed: articles
- NCBI: proteins

The enzyme fructose-2,6-bisphosphate 6-phosphatase (EC 3.1.3.54) catalyzes the reaction

fructose 2,6-bisphosphate
H_{2}O
P_{i}
β-D-fructose 2-phosphate

The enzyme characterised from yeast hydrolyses fructose 2,6-bisphosphate to β-D-fructose 2-phosphate and orthophosphate.

This enzyme is a hydrolase, specifically one acting on phosphoric monoester bonds. The systematic name of this enzyme class is β-D-fructose-2,6-bisphosphate 6-phosphohydrolase. Other names in use include fructose 2,6-bisphosphate-6-phosphohydrolase, fructose-2,6-bisphosphate 6-phosphohydrolase, and D-fructose-2,6-bisphosphate 6-phosphohydrolase.

== See also ==
- Fructose-2,6-bisphosphate 2-phosphatase, which removes specifically the 2-phosphate group from fructose 2,6-bisphosphate
