= TMEM242 =

Protein-coding gene in the species Homo sapiens

Identifiers
- Aliases: TMEM242, BM033, C6orf35, transmembrane protein 242
- External IDs: MGI: 1917794; HomoloGene: 44020; GeneCards: TMEM242; OMA:TMEM242 - orthologs

Gene location (Human)
Chr.	Chromosome 6 (human)
Band	6q25.3	Start	157,289,025 bp
Band	6q25.3	End	157,323,601 bp

Gene location (Mouse)
Chr.	Chromosome 17 (mouse)
Band	17|17 A1	Start	5,461,145 bp
Band	17|17 A1	End	5,490,534 bp
RNA expression pattern
Bgee	Human / Mouse (ortholog); Top expressed in: buccal mucosa cell; vena cava; decidua; Skeletal muscle tissue of rectus abdominis; right ventricle; pons; pericardium; body of tongue; prefrontal cortex; mucosa of pharynx / Top expressed in: muscle of thigh; yolk sac; intercostal muscle; right ventricle; soleus muscle; skeletal muscle tissue; medial ganglionic eminence; ventricular zone; spermatocyte; digastric muscle; More reference expression data
BioGPS	n/a
Orthologs
Species	Human	Mouse
Entrez	729515	70544
Ensembl	ENSG00000215712	ENSMUSG00000004945
UniProt	Q9NWH2	Q8VCR3
RefSeq (mRNA)	NM_018452	NM_027457
RefSeq (protein)	NP_060922	NP_081733
Location (UCSC)	Chr 6: 157.29 – 157.32 Mb	Chr 17: 5.46 – 5.49 Mb
PubMed search
- Wikidata
View/Edit Human	View/Edit Mouse

Transmembrane protein 242 (TMEM242) is a protein that in humans is encoded by the TMEM242 gene. The tmem242 gene is located on chromosome 6, on the long arm, in band 2 section 5.3. This protein is also commonly called C6orf35, BM033, and UPF0463 Transmembrane Protein C6orf35. The tmem242 gene is 35,238 base pairs long, and the protein is 141 amino acids in length. The tmem242 gene contains 4 exons. The function of this protein is not well understood by the scientific community. This protein contains a DUF1358 domain (Domain of Unknown Function 1358).

== Associated proteins ==
Several predicted interacting proteins and functional sites on the protein have been identified. One of the predicted interacting protein is MAP2K1IP1, which is a scaffold protein. This protein is known to be involved in the MAP Kinase pathway. The MAP Kinase pathway is associated with the Alzheimer's pathway through a protein called Tau or MAPT. Excessive phosphorylation of this protein leads to aggregation of neurons which can cause Alzheimer's disease. Other associated proteins include GGT7, RNF5, ELOVL4, GPR42, BCL2L13, HEATR1, IZUMO4, ARID1B, SIAE, EDARADD, URB1, ZDHHC14, KIF11, RRM2, KCTD13, TMEM31, NDUFA3, SGPL1, CNR2, and GJA8. All of the listed proteins have known functions.

== Function ==
The tmem242 protein is highly expressed in many tissues, but the most highly expressed in the brain, heart, adrenal, and thyroid.

== Homologs and orthologs ==
There are homologs and orthologs of the tmem242 protein in a variety of species. The species have diverged as far back as 794 million years ago. The following species have been found as having orthologs to the tmem242 protein in their genome:

- TMEM242, H. sapiens
- TMEM242, P. troglodytes
- Tmem242, M. musculus
- C1H6orf35, R. norvegicus
- TMEM242, C. lupus
- TMEM242, B. taurus
- C3H6ORF35, G. gallus
- tmem242, D. rerio
- tmem242, X. tropicalis
- AgaP_AGAP009165, A. gambiae
- CG11699, D. melanogaster

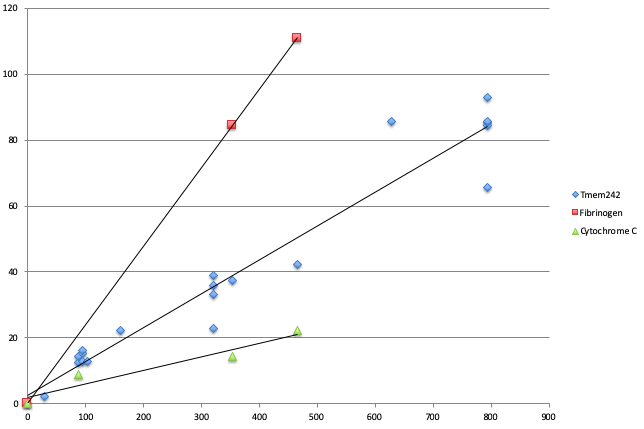
This image shows the corrected divergence for tmem242 compared to fibrinogen and cytochrome C

The image to the right represents the rate of divergence for tmem242 (blue) compared to fibrinogen (red) and cytochrome C (green). This graph shows that tmem242 is evolving at a rate that is in between that of fibrinogen, which evolves quickly, and cytochrome C, which evolves slowly.

== Regulation ==
=== Gene level ===
The promoter for the tmem242 gene is located upstream, but includes the transcription and translational start sites. This promoter was found using ElDorado by Genomatix. This promoter has many transcription factor binding sites. Some of these transcription factors include TFIIB, Mouse Krueppel like factor, and NKX homeodomain factors. One notable transcription factor is the Retinoblastoma-binding protein with demethylase activity. There are ubiquitous basal level expression of tmem242 in all tissues in human and mouse. There are other tissues with increase expression levels such as the cerebellum and the hippocampus. There is increase expression levels in many parts of the brain along with kidney and prostate. Tmem242 is also expressed in smaller amounts such as heart, adrenal gland, and thyroid.

=== Transcriptional level ===
Tmem242 has several predicted post-transcriptional stem loop structures in the 5' UTR. These structures use binding, both traditional and modified, to create stem loop structures in the untranslated regions of the mRNA.

=== Protein level ===
There are various forms of protein level regulation for tmem242. Tmem242 is found in a membrane within the cell. It is likely tmem242 is found in the cellular membrane or the mitochondrial membrane, but other sub cellular locations are possible. These include the endoplasmic reticulum and the nuclear membrane. There are various phosphorylation sites present on tmem242. These sites include cAMP and cGMP dependent protein kinase phosphorylation sites, casein kinase II phosphorylation sites, and a protein kinase C phosphorylation site. These site all favor the phosphorylation of serine and threonine residues. Other post-translational modifications include a N-myristoylation site, which covalently adds a myristate molecule.

== Structure ==
There are various single nucleotide polymorphisms (SNPs) that can occur in tmem242. A few cause stop codons, others make either silent mutations or missense mutations.

The TMEM242 protein has a conserved domain of unknown function pfam 07096, DUF 1358., which covers the first 121 aa of the protein. This domain is conserved in eukaryotes.

Tmem242 is 141 amino acids long, and contains at least one residue of each amino acid. There are two transmembrane domains, one spanning from approximately the 28th residue to the 48th reside. The second domain spans from approximately the 82nd residue to the 102nd residue. These amino acid residues are approximate as various sources have approximations for the transmembrane domains.

=== Secondary ===
Tmem242 has several secondary structures. The two transmembrane domains have alpha helices. These helices are formed from uncharged residues that are buried in the membrane. These helices are not exposed for binding. Other parts of the tmem242 protein may form secondary structures.

=== Tertiary ===
The tmem242 protein further folds to its final structure to embed in a membrane. It is likely tmem242 is embedded in the cellular membrane, there is also potential for tmem242 to embed in the mitochondrial membrane or the endoplasmic reticulum membrane.

=== Post-translational modification ===
Tmem242 undergoes various post-translational modification. There are 11 serine residues that have a potential to be phosphorylated. Those sites occur in residue numbers 13, 20, 51, 57, 65, 74, 76, 77, 119, 128, and 130. There are also four threonine residues that have the potential to be phosphorylated. Those site are residue numbers 36, 49, 123, and 137. Other post-translational modifications that potentially happen occur at specific motif sites. There are 12 motif sites in tmem242 that correlate to 4 different motif types. The four types are cAMP and cGMP dependent protein kinase phosphorylation site, casein kinase II phosphorylation site, N-myristoylation site, and protein kinase C phosphorylation site. There is one cAMP and cGMP dependent protein kinase phosphorylation site in tmem242, and this motif has a preference for phosphorylation of threonine and serine residues. There are four casein kinase II phosphorylation sites, and this motif is a serine/threonine kinase. There are six N-myristoylation sites in tmem242, and this motif signals a covalent attachment of myristate. There is one protein kinase C phosphorylation site which signals phosphorylation of serine or threonine resides.
