= HAMP domain =

HAMP

Identifiers
- Symbol: HAMP
- Pfam: PF00672
- Pfam clan: CL0681
- InterPro: IPR003660
- SCOP2: 2asx / SCOPe / SUPFAM
- OPM protein: 5iji
- CDD: cd06225
Available protein structures:
- PDB: IPR003660 PF00672 (ECOD; PDBsum)
- AlphaFold: IPR003660; PF00672

In molecular biology, the HAMP domain (present in Histidine kinases, Adenylate cyclases, Methyl accepting proteins and Phosphatases) is an approximately 50-amino acid alpha-helical region that forms a dimeric, four-helical coiled coil. It is found in bacterial sensor and chemotaxis proteins and in eukaryotic histidine kinases. The bacterial proteins are usually integral membrane proteins and part of a two-component signal transduction pathway. One or several copies of the HAMP domain can be found in association with other domains, such as the histidine kinase domain, the bacterial chemotaxis sensory transducer domain, the PAS repeat, the EAL domain, the GGDEF domain, the protein phosphatase 2C-like domain, the guanylate cyclase domain, or the response regulatory domain. In its most common setting, the HAMP domain transmits conformational changes in periplasmic ligand-binding domains to cytoplasmic signalling kinase and methyl-acceptor domains and thus regulates the phosphorylation or methylation activity of homodimeric receptors.
