= YecM bacterial protein domain =

YecM
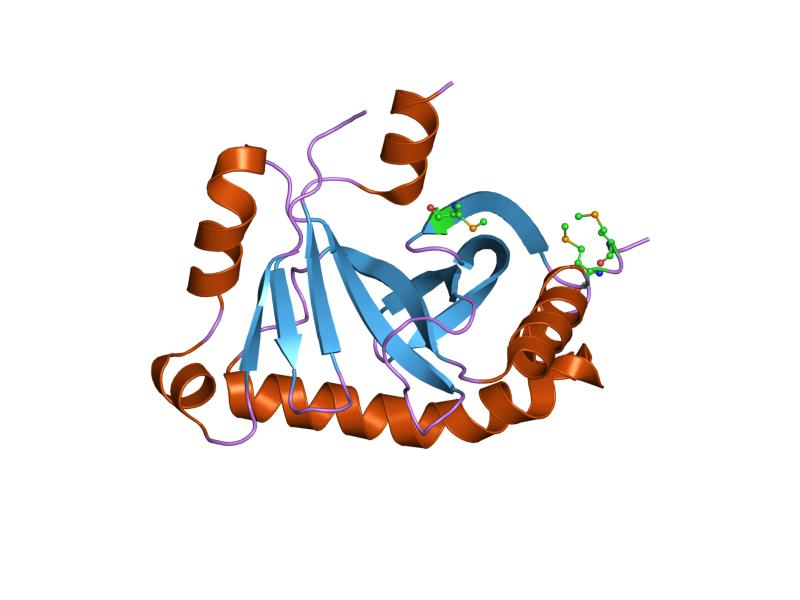
- structural genyyecn yecmyeyepomics, protein ec4020

Identifiers
- Symbol: YecM
- Pfam: PF06185
- Pfam clan: CL0104
- InterPro: IPR010393
- SCOP2: 1k4n / SCOPe / SUPFAM
Available protein structures:
- PDB: IPR010393 PF06185 (ECOD; PDBsum)
- AlphaFold: IPR010393; PF06185

In molecular biology, YecM refers to a protein domain found in Escherichia coli. It is a conserved, hypothetical protein with sequence homologues found exclusively in bacteria. Several bacterial YecM proteins in this particular family are of unknown function.

== Function ==
The precise function of the YecM domain remains to be elucidated. However, YecM structural homologues reveal that all the proteins bind a divalent metal cation. This comparison suggests that YecM may be a metal-binding protein and therefore may function as an enzyme.

== Structure ==
The protein domain, YecM, is a monomer. The eight, mostly antiparallel beta-strands form around C-terminal alpha-helix. There are four alpha helices in total.
