= Focadhesin =

Protein-coding gene in the species Homo sapiens

FOCAD

Identifiers
- Aliases: FOCAD, KIAA1797, focadhesin
- External IDs: OMIM: 614606; MGI: 2676921; GeneCards: FOCAD

Gene location (Human)
Chr.	Chromosome 9 (human)
Band	9p21.3	Start	20,658,309 bp
Band	9p21.3	End	20,995,955 bp

Gene location (Mouse)
Chr.	Chromosome 4 (mouse)
Band	4|4 C4	Start	88,094,629 bp
Band	4|4 C4	End	88,411,011 bp
RNA expression pattern
Bgee	Human / Mouse (ortholog); Top expressed in: Epithelium of choroid plexus; middle temporal gyrus; parotid gland; Brodmann area 23; epithelium of bronchus; bronchial epithelial cell; epithelium of colon; islet of Langerhans; endothelial cell; pituitary gland / Top expressed in: zygote; facial motor nucleus; granulocyte; primary oocyte; gastrula; superior frontal gyrus; lateral septal nucleus; spermatocyte; spermatid; secondary oocyte; More reference expression data
BioGPS	n/a
Orthologs
Databases	NCBI: entry; OMA: entry
Species	Human	Mouse
Entrez	54914	230393
Ensembl	ENSG00000188352	ENSMUSG00000038368
UniProt	Q5VW36	A2AKG8
RefSeq (mRNA)	NM_017794; NM_001375567; NM_001375568; NM_001375570	NM_001081184
RefSeq (protein)	NP_060264; NP_001362496; NP_001362497; NP_001362499	NP_001074653
Location (UCSC)	Chr 9: 20.66 – 21 Mb	Chr 4: 88.09 – 88.41 Mb
PubMed search
- Wikidata
View/Edit Human	View/Edit Mouse

Focadhesin is a protein that in humans is encoded by the FOCAD gene.. FOCAD is also known as KIAA1797.

A specific single-nucleotide polymorphism rs7875153 in KIAA1797 is associated with heart rate.

== Gene ==
KIAA1797 is a protein-coding gene in Homo sapiens. Alternate names for the gene are FLJ20375, OTTHUMP00000069845, and hypothetical protein LOC54914. Located on chromosome 9 at area p21.3, the entire gene including introns and exons is 375,010 base pairs on the plus strand. There are 19 alternative splice variants. Longest variant yields an mRNA of 6117 base pairs.

=== Expression ===
KIAA1797 was determined to express ubiquitously at varying levels throughout the human body. Based on the EST profile of Unigene, KIAA1797 expression has been observed in tissues ranging from reproductive to secretory.

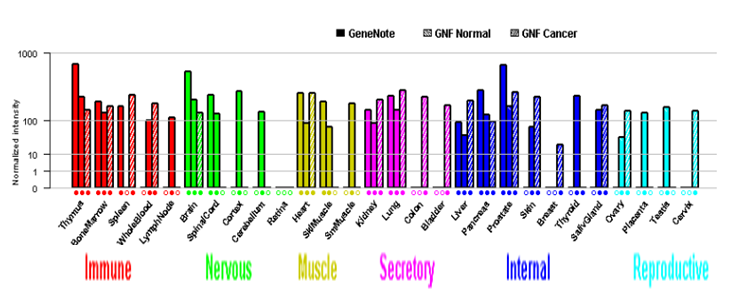

== mRNA ==
Predicted secondary mRNA structures in the 5'UTR and the 3'UTR are ugagaugaacucgguaucuca and uccuaagagaggag, respectively. Other possible secondary structures are shown in the table below.

== Protein sequence ==
The main isoform of the human protein is 1801 amino acids long, a total of 200,072 Da.

Two distinct domains of unknown function (DUF) are found in the sequence. DUF3730 (465-682aa) appears two times in the sequence; this domain family is found in eukaryotes and is typically between 220 and 262 amino acids in length. DUF3028(1213-1801aa). No additional information was available regarding this DUF.

== Homology ==
KIAA1797 is well conserved in mammals, but it is also found in nonmammalians with lower sequence identities.

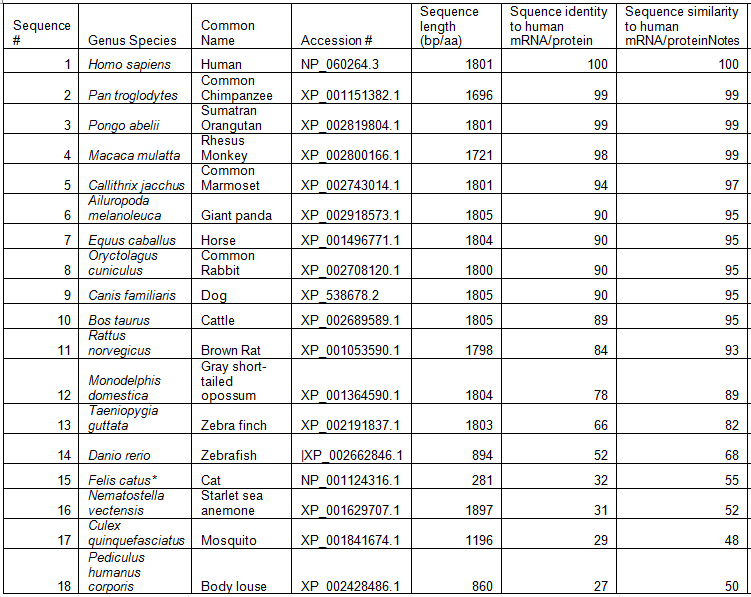
Ort of KIAA1797

== Gene neighborhood ==
KIAA1797 is downstream of MLLT3 and upstream of PTPLAD2. MLLT3 is involved with myeloid/lymphoid or mixed-lineage leukemia. PTPLAD2 is a protein tyrosine phosphatase.

== Function ==
The exact function of KIAA1797 is not yet understood by the scientific community. It is, however, found to be a transmembrane protein.
