= Diguanylate cyclase =

Class of enzymes

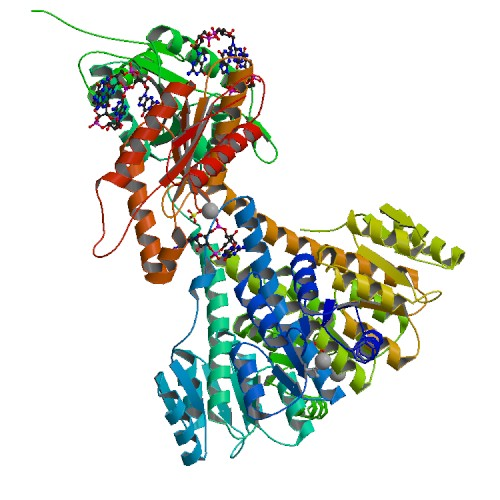
- Crystal structure of diguanylate cyclase PleD in complex with c-di-GMP from Caulobacter crescentus; rendering based on PDB: 2WB4

Identifiers
- EC no.: 2.7.7.65
- CAS no.: 146316-82-7

Databases
- IntEnz: IntEnz view
- BRENDA: BRENDA entry
- ExPASy: NiceZyme view
- KEGG: KEGG entry
- MetaCyc: metabolic pathway
- PRIAM: profile
- PDB structures: RCSB PDB PDBe PDBsum
- Gene Ontology: AmiGO / QuickGO
Search
- PMC: articles
- PubMed: articles
- NCBI: proteins

Diguanylate cyclase, also known as diguanylate kinase (EC 2.7.7.65), is an enzyme that catalyzes the chemical reaction:

2
guanosine triphosphate
2 PP_{i}
cyclic di-GMP

The substrates of diguanylate cyclases (DGCs) are two molecules of guanosine triphosphate (GTP) and the products are two molecules of diphosphate (PP_{i}) and one molecule of cyclic di-3’,5’-guanylate (cyclic di-GMP).

Degradation of cyclic di-GMP to guanosine monophosphate (GMP) is catalyzed by a phosphodiesterase (PDE).

== Structure ==
Diguanylate cyclases are characterized by the conserved amino acid sequence motifs “GGDEF” (Gly-Gly-Asp-Glu-Phe) or “GGEEF” (Gly-Gly-Glu-Glu-Phe), which constitute the domain of the DGC active site. These domains are often found coupled to other signaling domains within multidomain proteins. Often, GGDEF domains with DGC activity are found in the same proteins as c-di-GMP-specific phosphodiesterase (PDE) EAL (Glu-Ala-Leu) domains.

DGC is thought to only be active as a dimer consisting of two subunits, both with GGDEF domains. The active (or catalytic) site is located at the interface between the two subunits, each binding one molecule of GTP. (See Activation mechanism and Regulation section for more information)

Weak sequence similarity and pronounced secondary structure similarity between GGDEF domains and the catalytic domains of adenylate cyclases (AC) have led to the hypothesis that DGCs and ACs share a similar fold. This was verified with the resolution of the crystal structure of the DGC PleD from Caulobacter crescentus in complex with c-di-GMP. As shown in the figure, active PleD, shown as a dimer, is composed of the catalytic DCG domain (labeled DGC) and two CheY-like receiver domains (labeled D1/D2). The DGC domain of each subunit is linked to the two CheY-like domains by a flexible peptide linkage chain. The DCG domain closely resembles the domain of the AC catalytic core which consists of a five-stranded β-sheet surrounded by helices.

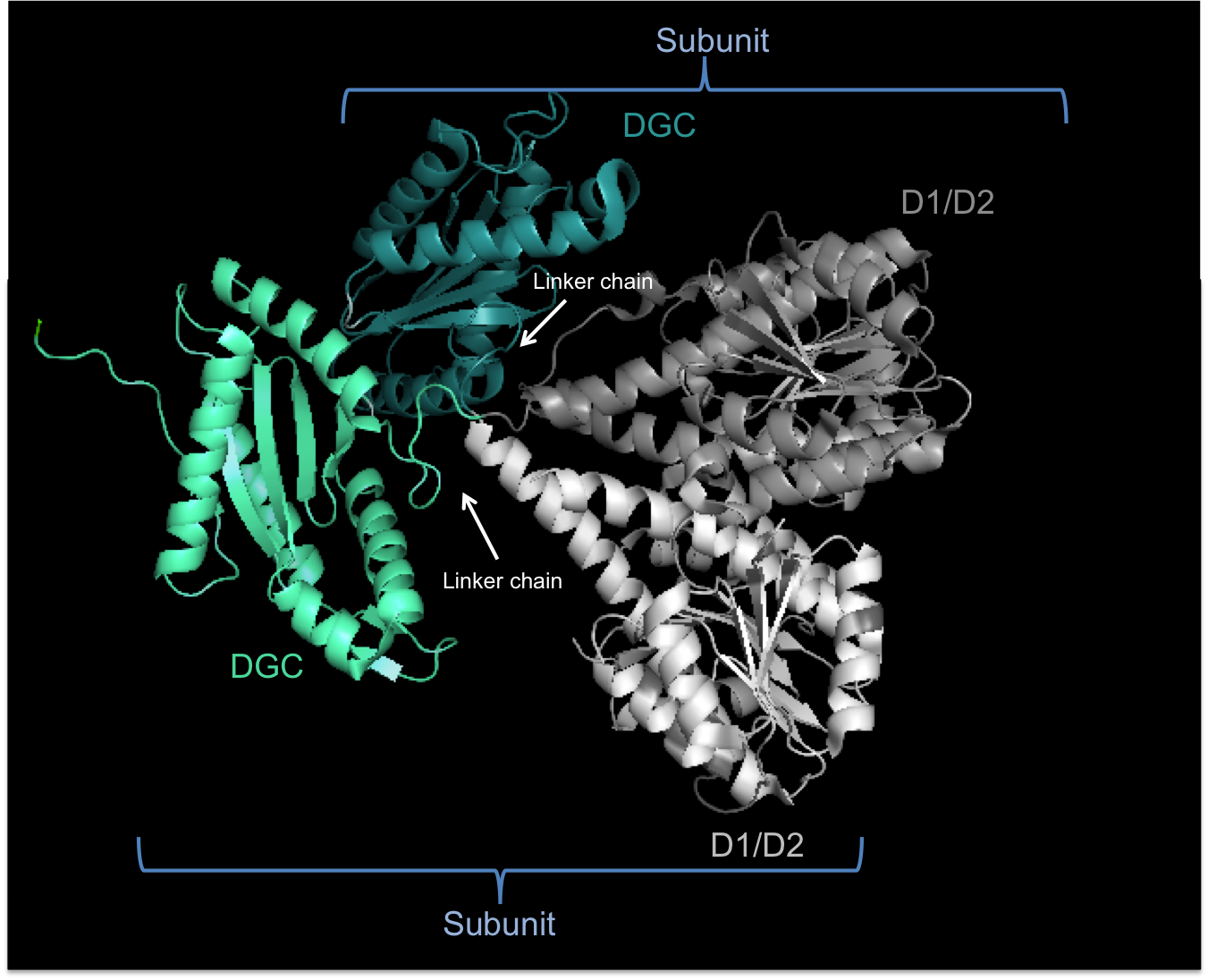
Structure of active (dimer) PleD showing Diguanylate Cyclase (DGC) and CheY-like (D1/D2) domains

As of mid-2011, 11 crystal structures of confirmed or putative DGCs have been solved, with PDB accession codes PDB: 3N53, PDB: 3N3T, PDB: 3MTK, PDB: 2WB4, PDB: 3KZP, PDB: 3HVA, PDB: 3I5A, PDB: 3IGN, PDB: 3HVW, PDB: 3H9W, and PDB: 2R60.

== Biological function ==
Diguanylate cyclase participate in the formation of the ubiquitous second messenger, cyclic-di-GMP, involved in bacterial biofilm formation and persistence. The GGDEF domain was first identified in the regulatory protein, PleD of the bacterium Caulobacter crescentus. It was later noted that numerous bacterial genomes encoded multiple proteins with a GGDEF domain. Pseudomonas aeruginosa PAO1 has 33 proteins with GGDEF domains, Escherichia coli K-12 has 19, and Vibrio cholerae O1 has 41. In the cell cycle of Caulobacter crescentus, DGC PleD is known to control pole morphogenesis. In Pseudomonas fluorescens DGC WspR activity is hypothesized to be partially responsible for the wrinkly spreader (WS) phenotype. In Pseudomonas aeruginosa, WspR has also been known to control autoaggregation.

=== Role of DGC in C. crescentus cell cycle ===
During the cell cycle of C. crescentus, proteins with GGDEF and EAL domains are separated towards the two distinct poles. The active form of diguanylate cyclase PleD localizes to the stalked pole of differentiating C. crescentus cells. It has been suggested that the function of PleD is two-fold. PleD is responsible for turning off flagellum rotations and inhibiting motility before genome replication begins and also for regenerating motility after differentiation has completed.

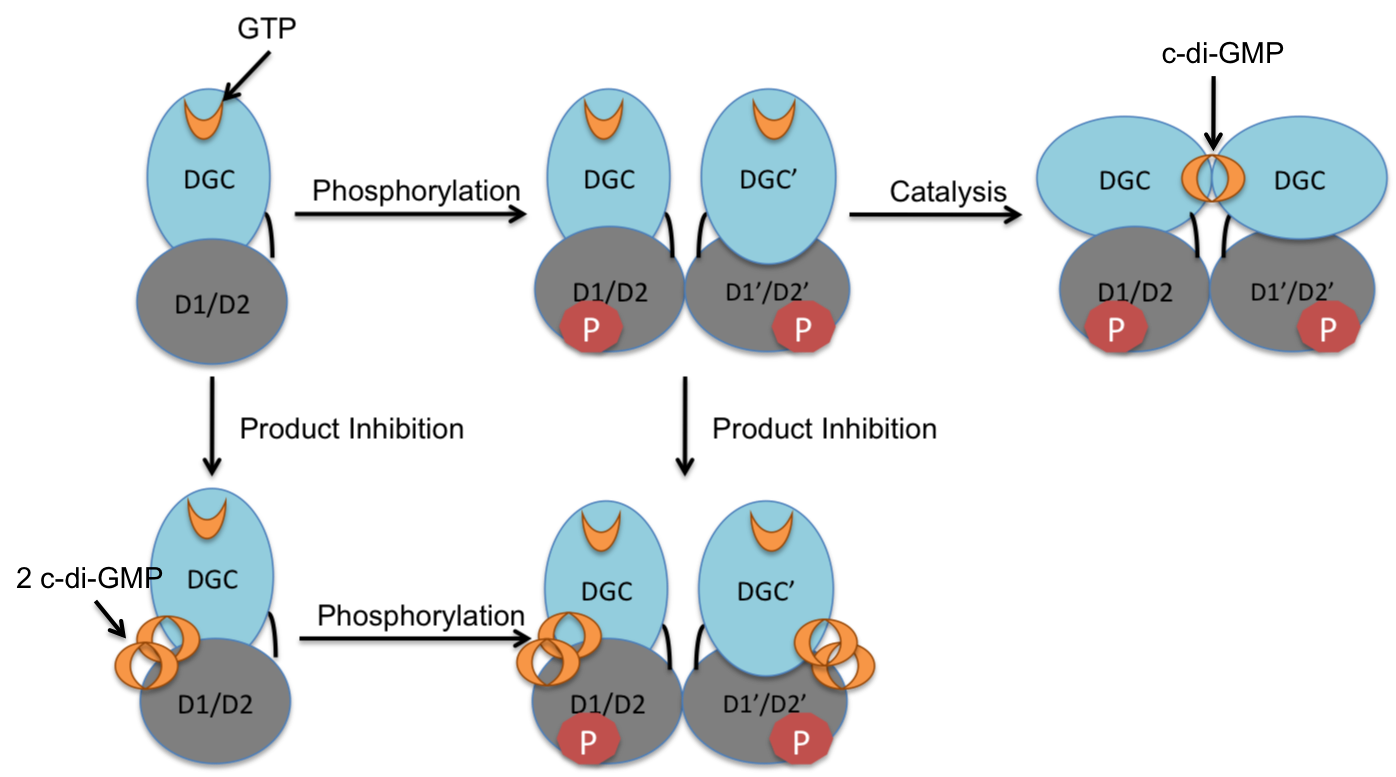
Activation Mechanism and Regulation through Product Inhibition of the DGC PleD from C. crescentus

== Activation Mechanism and Regulation ==
The crystal structure of the C. crescentus diguanylate cyclase, PleD, contains three domains; a GGDEF domain with diguanylate cyclase activity and two CheY-like receiver domains (D1/D2). As seen in the figure, the active form of PleD is a dimer which forms by phosphorylation of the first receiver domain (D1). Phosphorylation of the receiver domain increases the dimerization affinity by approximately 10-fold over non-phosphorylated domains.

Inhibition of DGC activity is thought to be allosteric and non-competitive. Cyclic di-GMP binds to interface between the DGC and D2 domains stabilizing the open structure and preventing catalysis. Strong product inhibition has been observed with a Ki of 0.5 μM.

Though the exact catalytic mechanism has not been resolved, it is hypothesized that the dimerized structure of PleD facilitates interaction of the two GTP molecules within the DGC active site for cyclization. A proposed mechanism by Chan et al. indicates that the 3'-OH group of the GTP is deprotonated by a glutamic acid residue (E370) to allow for intermolecular nucleophilic attack of the α-phosphate. The pentacoordinated transition state created through this nucleophilic attack is possibly stabilized by a Lysine residue (K332).

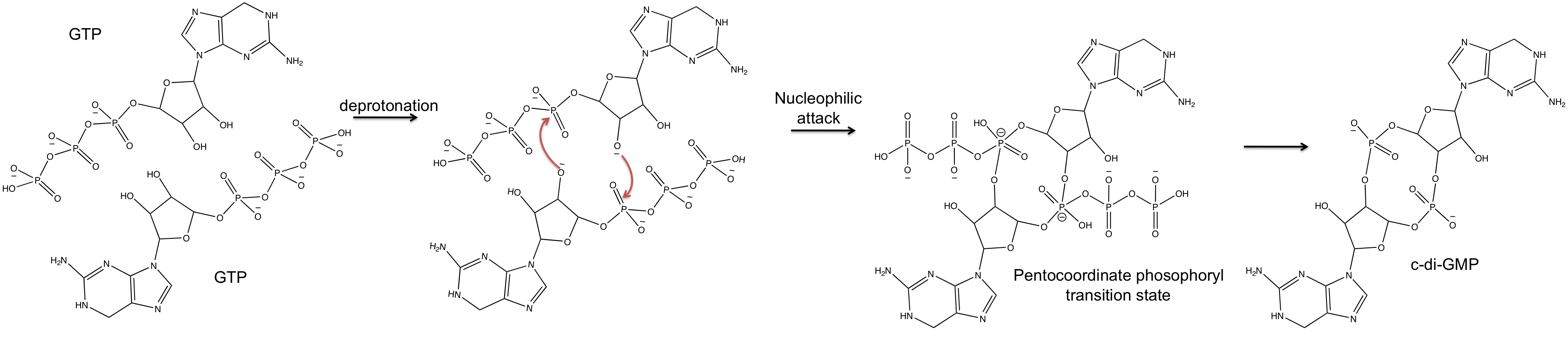
c-di-GMP formation: In PleD residue E370 may act as a generic base and K332 may stabilize charge on pentachoordinated transition state
