= Marcin Hoffmann =

Polish scientist and entrepreneur (born 1972)

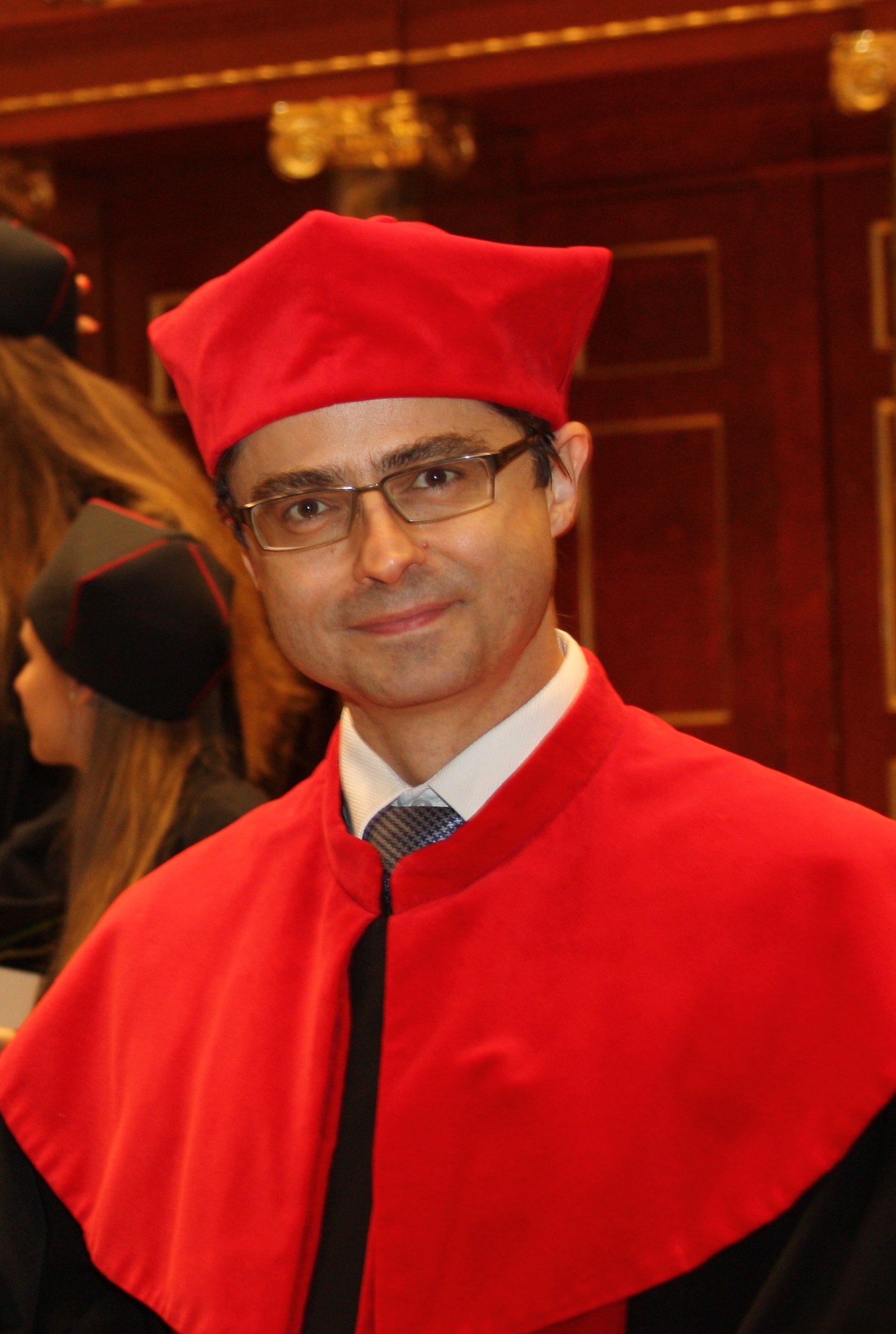
- Born: 2 October 1972 (age 53); Godziesze Wielkie, Poland
- Education: Adam Mickiewicz University in Poznań
- Scientific career
- Fields: Quantum chemistry; Computational chemistry; Bioinformatics
- Thesis: Effects of substitution of hydroxyl group by fluorine atom - ab initio and DFT studies (2000)

Marcin Maciej Hoffmann (born October 2, 1972) is a Polish scientist and entrepreneur. He is a professor of chemistry at the Faculty of Chemistry of Adam Mickiewicz University in Poznań.

== Early years ==
Hoffmann was born in 1972 in Godziesze Wielkie, a small town near Kalisz. He attended No. 30 Primary School in Poznań and the Karol Marcinkowski High School in Poznań; at that time, he succeeded as a laureate of Polish Physics Olympiad and twice as a laureate of Polish Chemistry Olympiad. In 1996, he was awarded the MSc in Chemistry title at the Faculty of Chemistry of Adam Mickiewicz University in Poznań; his thesis Theoretical analysis of selected (R,R)-tartaric acid derivatives, supervised by Jacek Rychlewski, was awarded the first prize in Faculty's Contest for the best MSc dissertation of that year. In 1997, he achieved MSc in Biotechnology at the AMU Faculty of Biology for his thesis Properties of glycoproteins isolated from Chelidonium majus milky sap, supervised by Anna Goździcka-Józefiak. During his MSc courses he won a number of various scholarships, including ones granted by the Minister of National Education. and the Stefan Batory Foundation, he was also the President of Student Council at the AMU Faculty of Chemistry. In 2000, he defended his PhD thesis in chemistry, Effects of substitution of hydroxyl group by fluorine atom - ab initio and DFT studies (under the supervision of Rychlewski), rewarded with the first prize in annual Faculty's Contest for the best PhD dissertation. He also completed an MBA degree, organized jointly by Poznań Academy of Economics and Georgia State University in Atlanta in 2000 (with Henryk Mruk as the tutor of his managerial project) and postgraduate studies in computer science at the AMU Faculty of Mathematics and Computer Science in 2004.

== Academic career ==
Already during his MSc course, Hoffmann took an academic internship at the University of Oxford under Dr John M. Brown. Upon receiving his PhD degree, he was employed as assistant professor at the AMU Faculty of Chemistry; in 2001–2002, he worked as a postdoctoral fellow at Emory University in Atlanta, where he conducted research under the supervision of Keiji Morokuma, a globally recognized expert in quantum chemistry. As a young scientist, he was awarded a number of scholarships by various institutions, such as the Foundation for Polish Science and the Centre for Applied Wave Mechanics (Centre de Mécanique Ondulatoire Appliquée). He defended his habilitation thesis Quantum-chemical calculations in molecular modelling of selected systems of importance in chemistry, biochemistry, and medicine in 2009 and became an associate professor two years later. On March 8, 2017, at the age of 44, he was conferred the professor title by Andrzej Duda, the President of the Republic of Poland.

=== Scientific activity ===
Hoffmann's research focuses on the application of computational methods of quantum chemistry in the investigation of the structure of molecules and the interactions between them, as well as modelling of enzymatic reactions along with designing novel drugs and chemical compounds of desirable activity with the use of computational models built for this purpose. The results of his scientific research include:

- Determination of the effect of substitution of hydroxyl group by fluorine atom in a series of compounds, including (R,R)-tartaric acid derivatives and D-glucose, on their conformational freedom.
- Detailed conformational analysis of multiple (R,R)-tartaric acid derivatives.
- Detailed explanation of the mechanism of squalene epoxidase inhibition by terbinafine and elucidation of a fully atomic three-dimensional model of this protein.
- Investigation of double proton transfer in the lumichrome dimer and in lumichrome/acetic acid system.
- Detailed research on the influence of a wide range of substituents on geometric and electronic structure of fluoro- and trifluoromethylbenzene derivatives.
- Explanation of the mechanism of azathioprine bioactivation by cysteine and glutathione molecules.
- Characterization of homo- and heterodinuclear complexes of Zn(II) and Ln(III) ions with a tridentate Schiff-base ligand.
- Investigation of selected purine derivatives (antimetabolites) membrane transport.
- Determination of protein effects of the O_{2} molecule binding to the active site of methane monooxygenase.
- Discovery of frequent occurrence of palindromic sequences in protein molecules.
- Evaluation of effectiveness of Fe(0) complexes with multivinylsilicone ligands in hydrosilylation and dehydrogenative silylation of styrene with trisubstituted silanes and hydrosiloxanes.
- Discovery of a common palindromic sequence (TCTCGCGAGA) in human gene promoters.
- Conformational analysis of fluvastatin and atorvastatin along with elucidation of the mechanism of their lactone-hydroxycarboxylic acid interconversion in acidic and alkaline environment.
- Explanation of the mechanism of interaction between SARS coronavirus helicase/ATPase and ATP and design of potential inhibitors of this enzyme.
- Design of novel leulcyl-tRNA synthetase inhibitors based on self-made aminoacyl-tRNA synthase inhibitor database.
- Identification of novel pregnane X receptor activators.
- Development of a self-made computer program MM2QM, combining docking, molecular dynamics, molecular mechanics, and quantum mechanics.
- Investigation of the mechanism of telomerase inhibition by Chelidonium majus isoquinoline alkaloids through stabilization of telomeric G-quadruplex sequences.
- Elucidation of geometry of UO_{4}^{−} ion, formed upon dissociation of some complex uranyl anions.

These and other studies resulted in authorship and co-authorship of ca. 100 publications (101 according to Google Scholar), including highly prestigious scientific journals, such as Journal of the American Chemical Society and Cancer Research. His papers are increasingly cited year after year (totalling 960 - Google Scholar), which yields 9,50 citations per publication and the h-index of 18.

=== Educational activity ===
Since 1996, Hoffmann has been actively teaching at the AMU Faculty of Chemistry, partly in English. These classes include lectures, seminars, proseminars and laboratory exercises in a wide range of courses, from fundamental subjects, namely physical chemistry, quantum chemistry and theoretical chemistry, to more specific ones, such as the application of computational methods, molecular modelling and online databases in other branches of chemistry. He also worked as a teacher in X High School in Poznań for two years (1999-2001). During his career he has supervised several tens of bachelor's and master's theses, as well as four doctoral dissertations:

- Dr Jakub Paś (2013), dissertation title: Application and implementation of probabilistic profile-profile comparison methods for protein fold recognition.
- Dr Marcin Nowosielski (2015), dissertation title: Quantum and classical mechanics computational methods in computer-aided drug design.
- Dr Wojciech Jankowski (2017), dissertation title: Quantum-chemical studies of complexes of selected alkaloids with zinc(II) and copper(II) ions.
- Dr Martyna Kuta-Siejkowska (2018), dissertation title: Studies on interactions of protooncogenic G-quadruplexes with ligands.

He has also reviewed several tens of bachelor's and master's theses, seven doctoral dissertations, two habilitation processes and two applications for the professor title (by Dr hab. Mariusz Makowski, UG and Dr hab. Robert Wieczorek, UWr).

=== Organizational activity ===
For many years, Hoffmann has been actively working for the expansion of Adam Mickiewicz University's scientific and educational abilities, for example by initiating and co-authoring AMU – supranational and interdisciplinary solutions of 21st century (pl. UAM – ponadnarodowe i interdyscyplinarne rozwiązania XXI wieku) – a project co-funded by the National Centre for Research and Development, carried out in cooperation with the University of Massachusetts Lowell, and co-authoring BSc, MSc and PhD course programmes at the Faculty of Chemistry. He vigorously participates in organizing science popularization events at the Faculty, such as Poznań Festival of Science and Art or European Researchers' Night. Since 2012, he has been serving as Deputy Dean for Research (re-elected in 2016). He is the initiator of and the Secretary of the Jury awarding Jacek Rychlewski Prize of the Polish Chemical Society for the best MSc thesis on quantum chemistry or exploiting quantum chemistry methods in other branches of science. He has reviewed and issued opinions on the implementation of research projects funded by the National Science Centre, applications for grants for young scientists and project applications submitted to Polish Grid Infrastructure PLGrid. In 2013, in cooperation with BioInfoBank Institute and Interdisciplinary Centre for Mathematical and Computational Modelling, Hoffmann organized an international conference Advances in Molecular Modelling. Since 2014, he is a member of the Scientific Committee of All-Polish PhD Students' Seminar "Between Chemistry and Biology" (pl. Ogólnopolskie Seminarium Doktorantów „Na pograniczu chemii i biologii”). He also chaired the proceeding of theoretical and computational chemistry section during the 59th Scientific Congress of the Polish Chemical Society in 2016.

== Other achievements ==
Aside from his academic work, Hoffmann has been widely cooperating with high-tech enterprises, implementing the idea of knowledge-based economy, for almost twenty years. In 2002–2003, he worked as McKinsey & Company consultant, managing telecommunications and energy carriers; in 2004, he became the Director for Investments & Development at BioInfoBank Institute. In 2007, together with Leszek Rychlewski, he founded BIB Seed Capital - a seed capital fund focused on supporting Polish scientific and engineering thought in such fields as bioinformatics, molecular biology, chemistry and computer science, along with facilitating its transfer to small and medium-sized enterprises. Well-aimed investments of the company, led by Hoffmann to the present day, allowed it to multiply its financial resources, and some of the startups it had funded became global players, such as:

- Medicalgorithmics S.A. – a Polish high-tech company, an expert in and a supplier of systemic and algorithmic solutions in cardiac diagnosis; the company is listed on the Warsaw Stock Exchange.
- Proteon Pharmaceuticals S.A. – a Polish pharmaceutical company, which carries out research of bacteriophages and uses them as a basis for developing novel formulations - successful substitutes for antibiotics

Since 2010, he has worked as expert witness of the District Court in Poznań in exact sciences, economic sciences and enterprise; he has also issued expert opinions for courts in other cities, including Warsaw, Myślibórz and Łowicz.

== Sources ==
- Hoffmann, Marcin (2014). "Curriculum Vitae" (PDF). medicalgorithmics.com (in Polish). Archived from the original (PDF) on 2016-07-29.
- "Marcin Hoffmann". Information Processing Centre database (in Polish).
