= Glucose-1,6-bisphosphate synthase =

Type of enzyme

Identifiers
- EC no.: 2.7.1.106
- CAS no.: 56214-39-2

Databases
- IntEnz: IntEnz view
- BRENDA: BRENDA entry
- ExPASy: NiceZyme view
- KEGG: KEGG entry
- MetaCyc: metabolic pathway
- PRIAM: profile
- PDB structures: RCSB PDB PDBe PDBsum
Search
- PMC: articles
- PubMed: articles
- NCBI: proteins

Glucose-1,6-bisphosphate synthase (EC 2.7.1.106) is an enzyme of the phosphotransferase type and is involved in mammalian starch and sucrose metabolism. It catalyzes the transfer of a phosphate group from 1,3-bisphosphoglycerate to glucose-1-phosphate, yielding 3-phosphoglycerate and glucose-1,6-bisphosphate.

The enzyme requires a divalent metal ion cofactor. Zinc (Zn^{2+}), Magnesium (Mg^{2+}), Manganese (Mn^{2+}), Calcium (Ca^{2+}), Nickel (Ni^{2+}), Copper (Cu^{2+}), Cadmium (Cd^{2+}) are all proven effective cofactors in vitro. Additionally, the enzyme appears to function optimally in a pH range from 7.3–8.7 and at a temperature of 25 °C.

== Function ==
The enzyme catalyzes a reaction that transfers a phosphate group from the donor, 1,3-bisphospho-D-glyceric acid, to glucose 1-phosphate:

1,3-bisphospho-D-glyceric acid
+
glucose 1-phosphate
3-phosphoglyceric acid
+
glucose 1,6-bisphosphate

== Metabolic significance of the catalyzed reaction ==
The main product, glucose-1,6-bisphosphate, appears to have several functions:

1. Inhibition of hexokinase, an enzyme used in the first step of glycolysis.

2. Activation of phosphofructokinase-1 (PFK-1) and pyruvate kinase, both of which are enzymes involved in activation of the glycolytic pathway.

3. It acts as a coenzyme for phosphoglucomutase in glycolysis and gluconeogenesis.

4. It acts as a cofactor for phosphopentomutase, which produces D-ribose-5-phosphate. 5. acts as a phosphate donor molecule for unknown nonmetabolic effector proteins.

6. It increases in concentration during skeletal muscle contraction.

7. Its dephosphorylation yields glucose-6-phosphate, which is an important precursor molecule in glycolysis and the pentose phosphate pathway.

Glucose-1,6-bisphosphate is most likely used in correlation with gluconeolysis. The product’s inhibition of hexokinase and activation of PFK-1 and pyruvate kinase is indicative of its role in glycolysis. Glucose-1,6-bisphosphate inhibit hexokinase stopping the production glucose-6-phosphate from D-glucose. Its activation of PFK-1 and pyruvate kinase shows that glycolysis still continues without the production of glucose-6-phosphate from D-glucose. This means that the glucose-6-phosphate needed for glycolysis most likely comes from gluconeolysis.

The reactant glucose-1-phosphate is produced by gluconeolysis. This reactant can also form D-glucose-6-phosphate, which is needed for glycolysis. It can therefore be inferred that it is possible when glucose-1-phosphate is produced, it makes glucose-1,6-bisphosphate (with glucose-1,6-bisophosphate synthase) and glucose-6-phosphate. The glucose-1,6-bisphosphate increase the activity of glycolysis, of which glucose-6-phosphate is a reagent.

In addition, one of the reactants (1,3-bisphosphoglycerate) and one of the products (3-phosphoglycerate) are intermediates in the 'payoff' phase of glycolysis. In other words, two molecules involved with glucose-1,6-bisphosphate synthase are able to be both created and recycled in the glycolytic pathway.

The reactant glucose 1-phosphate is an important precursor molecule in many different pathways, including glycolysis, gluconeogenesis and the pentose phosphate pathway.

== Regulation of the enzyme ==
Glucose-1,6-bisphosphate synthase is allosterically inhibited by inorganic phosphate, fructose-1,6-bisphosphate, 3-phosphoglycerate (a product), citrate, lithium, phosphoenolpyruvate (PEP), and acetyl CoA.

The inhibition of the enzyme by fructose-1,6-bisphosphate is most likely a feedback inhibition due to the product of the enzyme (glucose-1,6-bisphosphate) activation of PFK-1 (the enzyme which produces fructose-1,6-bisphosphate). When too much fructose-1,6-bisphosphate is produced, it inhibited the production of more PFK-1 activator.

The enzyme is also inhibited by PEP, which is a reagent of pyruvate kinase. The product of glucose-1,6-bisphosphate synthase (glucose-1,6-bisphosphate) activates pyruvate kinase.

Glucose-1,6-bisphosphate synthase appears to be activated by the presence of one of its substrates: 1,3-bisphosphoglycerate (glycerate-1,3-bisphosphate).

== Enzyme structure ==
No structure determination of glucose-1,6-bisphosphate synthase has been documented to date. Nevertheless, studies have shown that its structure appears to be markedly similar to a related enzyme called phosphoglucomutase. Both enzymes contain serine linked phosphates in their active sites, both have the same molecular weights, and both require a metal ion cofactor. Perhaps most importantly, both enzymes produce glucose-1,6-bisphosphate as either a product or an intermediate.
