= Fructose-2,6-bisphosphate 2-phosphatase =

Class of enzymes

fructose-2,6-bisphosphate 2-phosphatase

Identifiers
- EC no.: 3.1.3.46
- CAS no.: 81611-75-8

Databases
- BRENDA: enzyme data
- ExPASy: NiceZyme view
- KEGG: enzyme entry
- MetaCyc: metabolic pathway
- Rhea: reactions
- PDB structures: RCSB PDB PDBe PDBsum
- Gene Ontology: AmiGO / QuickGO
Search
- PMC: articles
- PubMed: articles
- NCBI: proteins

The enzyme fructose-2,6-bisphosphate 2-phosphatase ({EC 3.1.3.46) catalyzes the reversible reaction

fructose 2,6-bisphosphate
H_{2}O
P_{i}
ADP
ATP
D-fructose 6-phosphate

The enzyme characterised from rat liver hydrolyses fructose 2,6-bisphosphate to D-fructose 6-phosphate and orthophosphate. In Arabidopsis thaliana and rice, where it has a role in salt tolerance, the reaction catalysed is reversible, and in the direction from the monophosphate to the biphosphate is equivalent to phosphofructokinase 2, requiring adenosine triphosphate to provide the phosphate group. These reactions help regulate fatty acid biosynthesis in plants.

This enzyme is a hydrolase, specifically one acting on phosphoric monoester bonds. The systematic name is β-D-fructose-2,6-bisphosphate 2-phosphohydrolase. Other names in common use include fructose-2,6-bisphosphatase, and D-fructose-2,6-bisphosphate 2-phosphohydrolase.

== Structural studies ==
As of late 2007, 13 structures have been solved for this class of enzymes, with PDB accession codes PDB: 1BIF, PDB: 1C7Z, PDB: 1C80, PDB: 1C81, PDB: 1FBT, PDB: 1K6M, PDB: 1TIP, PDB: 2AXN, PDB: 2BIF, PDB: 2DWO, PDB: 2DWP, PDB: 2I1V, and PDB: 3BIF.
