= Phosphoglucokinase =

Identifiers
- EC no.: 2.7.1.10
- CAS no.: 9032-96-6

Databases
- IntEnz: IntEnz view
- BRENDA: BRENDA entry
- ExPASy: NiceZyme view
- KEGG: KEGG entry
- MetaCyc: metabolic pathway
- PRIAM: profile
- PDB structures: RCSB PDB PDBe PDBsum
- Gene Ontology: AmiGO / QuickGO
Search
- PMC: articles
- PubMed: articles
- NCBI: proteins

Phosphoglucokinase (EC 2.7.1.10) is an enzyme that catalyzes the chemical reaction

ATP +
glucose 1-phosphate
ADP +
glucose 1,6-bisphosphate

The enzyme converts the hexose sugar phosphate, glucose 1-phosphate, to glucose 1,6-bisphosphate by transferring a phosphate group from the cofactor, adenosine triphosphate (ATP), which is converted to adenosine diphosphate (ADP).

This enzyme is a transferase, specifically one transferring phosphorus-containing groups (phosphotransferases) with an alcohol group as acceptor. The systematic name of this enzyme class is ATP:alpha-D-glucose-1-phosphate 6-phosphotransferase. Other names in common use include glucose-phosphate kinase, phosphoglucokinase (phosphorylating), and ATP:D-glucose-1-phosphate 6-phosphotransferase.
