= Inositol-1,4-bisphosphate 1-phosphatase =

Class of enzymes

inositol-1,4-bisphosphate 1-phosphatase
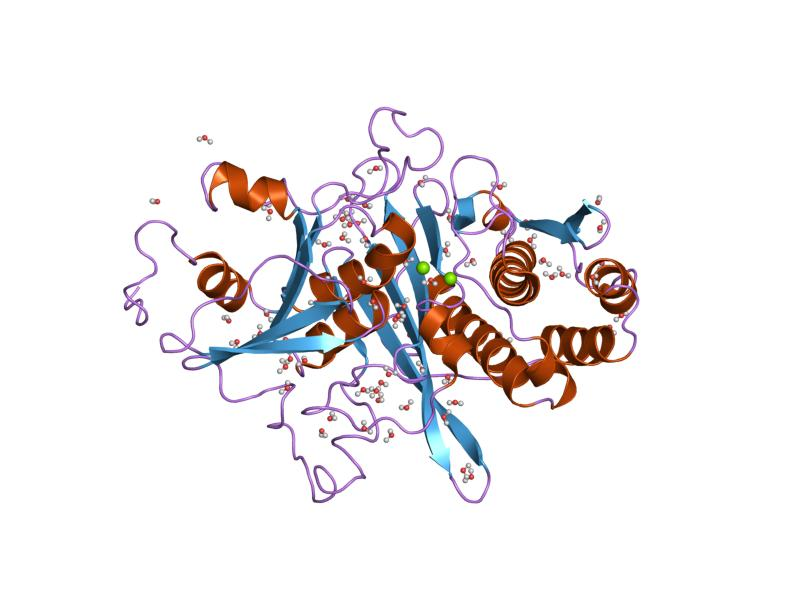
- Structure 1inp

Identifiers
- EC no.: 3.1.3.57
- CAS no.: 111070-17-8

Databases
- BRENDA: enzyme data
- ExPASy: NiceZyme view
- KEGG: enzyme entry
- MetaCyc: metabolic pathway
- Rhea: reactions
- PDB structures: RCSB PDB PDBe PDBsum
- Gene Ontology: AmiGO / QuickGO
Search
- PMC: articles
- PubMed: articles
- NCBI: proteins

The enzyme inositol-1,4-bisphosphate 1-phosphatase (EC 3.1.3.57) catalyzes the reaction

inositol (1,4)-bisphosphate
H_{2}O
P_{i}
inositol 4-phosphate

The enzyme characterised from brain hydrolyses D-myo-inositol (1,4)-bisphosphate to inositol 4-phosphate and orthophosphate. It has been studied in relation to bipolar disorder.

This enzyme is a hydrolase, specifically one acting on phosphoric monoester bonds. The systematic name is D-myo-inositol-1,4-bisphosphate 1-phosphohydrolase. This enzyme is also called inositol-polyphosphate 1-phosphatase.

== Structural studies ==
As of late 2007, two structures have been solved for this class of enzymes, with PDB accession codes PDB: 1INP and PDB: 1JP4.
