= Guanosine-triphosphate guanylyltransferase =

Class of enzymes

guanosine-triphosphate guanylyltransferase

Identifiers
- EC no.: 2.7.7.45
- CAS no.: 54576-89-5

Databases
- IntEnz: IntEnz view
- BRENDA: BRENDA entry
- ExPASy: NiceZyme view
- KEGG: KEGG entry
- MetaCyc: metabolic pathway
- PRIAM: profile
- PDB structures: RCSB PDB PDBe PDBsum
- Gene Ontology: AmiGO / QuickGO
Search
- PMC: articles
- PubMed: articles
- NCBI: proteins

Guanosine-triphosphate guanylyltransferase (EC 2.7.7.45) is an enzyme that catalyzes the chemical reaction

2
guanosine triphosphate
PP_{i}
P(1),P(4)-bis(5'-guanosyl) tetraphosphate

The enzyme characterised from brine shrimp combines two molecules of guanosine triphosphate to give P(1),P(4)-bis(5'-guanosyl) tetraphosphate, with pyrophosphate (PP_{i}) as a byproduct.

This enzyme is a transferases, specifically one transferring phosphorus-containing nucleotide groups (nucleotidyltransferases). The systematic name of this enzyme class is GTP:GTP guanylyltransferase. Other names in common use include diguanosine tetraphosphate synthetase, GTP-GTP guanylyltransferase, Gp4G synthetase, and guanosine triphosphate-guanose triphosphate guanylyltransferase.
