= Tagatose-bisphosphate aldolase =

tagatose-bisphosphate aldolase

Identifiers
- EC no.: 4.1.2.40
- CAS no.: 39433-95-9

Databases
- IntEnz: IntEnz view
- BRENDA: BRENDA entry
- ExPASy: NiceZyme view
- KEGG: KEGG entry
- MetaCyc: metabolic pathway
- PRIAM: profile
- PDB structures: RCSB PDB PDBe PDBsum
- Gene Ontology: AmiGO / QuickGO
Search
- PMC: articles
- PubMed: articles
- NCBI: proteins

The enzyme tagatose-bisphosphate aldolase (EC 4.1.2.40) catalyzes the chemical reaction

D-tagatose 1,6-bisphosphate $\rightleftharpoons$ glycerone phosphate + Dglyceraldehyde 3-phosphate

This enzyme belongs to the family of lyases, specifically the aldehyde-lyases, which cleave carbon-carbon bonds. The systematic name of this enzyme class is D-tagatose 1,6-bisphosphate D-glyceraldehyde-3-phosphate-lyase (glycerone-phosphate-forming). This enzyme is also called D-tagatose-1,6-bisphosphate triosephosphate lyase. This enzyme participates in galactose metabolism.

== Structural studies ==
As of late 2007, only one structure has been solved for this class of enzymes, with the PDB accession code 1GVF.
