= CXorf49 =

Identifiers
- Aliases: CXorf49, chromosome X open reading frame 49
- External IDs: GeneCards: CXorf49

Gene location (Human)
Chr.	X chromosome (human)
Band	Xq13.1	Start	71,714,371 bp
Band	Xq13.1	End	71,718,285 bp

Gene location (Mouse)
Chr.	X chromosome (mouse)
Band	X D	Start	101,790,053 bp
Band	X D	End	101,794,423 bp
RNA expression pattern
Bgee	Human / Mouse (ortholog); Top expressed in: gonad; testicle; left testis; right testis; tibial nerve; body of stomach; right auricle of heart; apex of heart; fundus; minor salivary glands / Top expressed in: secondary oocyte; spermatid; primary oocyte; zygote; testicle; embryo; embryo; spermatocyte; morula; yolk sac; More reference expression data
BioGPS	n/a
Orthologs
Databases	NCBI: entry; OMA: entry
Species	Human	Mouse
Entrez	100130361	102634296
Ensembl	ENSG00000215115	ENSMUSG00000045010
UniProt	A8MYA2	n/a
RefSeq (mRNA)	NM_001145140	XM_006528369
RefSeq (protein)	NP_001138611; NP_001138612	n/a
Location (UCSC)	Chr X: 71.71 – 71.72 Mb	Chr X: 101.79 – 101.79 Mb
PubMed search
- Wikidata
View/Edit Human	View/Edit Mouse

Uncharacterized protein CXorf49 is a protein, which in humans is encoded by the gene CXorf49 (chromosome X open reading frame 49). This protein is identical to the protein encoded by the related gene, CXorf49B.

== Gene ==
CXorf49 is located on the X chromosome at Xq13.1. It is 3912 base pairs long and the gene sequence has 6 exons. CXorf49 has one protein coding transcript.

== Protein ==
The protein has 514 amino acids and a molecular mass of 54.4 kDa. The isoelectric point is 9.3. Compared to other human proteins CXorf49 is glycine- and proline-rich, but the protein has lower levels of asparagine, isoleucine, tyrosine and threonine(Statistical Analysis of Protein Sequences, SAPS).

=== Domains ===
DUF4641 is a part of pfam15483.

== Expression ==
=== Promoter region ===
The promoter region of CXorf49 is located between base pair 71718051 and 71718785 on the minus strand of the X chromosome and it is 735 bp long (Genomatix's ElDorado program). One of the most frequent transcription factor binding-sites in the promoter region are sites for Y-box binding factor.

=== Expression ===
Though expression of CXorf49 is very low in human cells, is it somewhat higher in connective tissues, testis and uterus.

== Interactions ==
CXorf49 is found to be one of the components of a small group of the HL-60 cell proteome that were most prone to form 4-Hydroxy-2-nonenal(HNE) adducts, upon exposure to nontoxic (10 μM) HNE concentrations, along with heat shock 60 kDa protein 1.

== Homology ==
Using BLAST no orthologs for CXorf49 are found in single celled organisms, fungi or plants whose genomes have been sequenced. For multicellular organisms orthologs are found in mammals. The table below show a selection of the mammal orthologs. They are listed after time of divergence from human.

Genus and species name	Common name	Accession number	Sequence length	Identity to human protein
Pan troglodytes	Chimpanzee	XP_001137982	514 aa	98 %
Callithrix jacchus	Common marmoset	XP_008987719	487 aa	65 %
Galeopterus variegatus	Malayan flying lemur	XP_008574823	525 aa	54 %
Tupaia chinensis	Chinese tree shrew	XP_006168003	527 aa	35 %
Chinchilla lanigera	Long-tailed chinchilla	XP_013358263	307 aa	49 %
Mus musculus	House mouse	NP_081944	513 aa	36 %
Canis lupus familiaris	Dog	XP_850392	526 aa	54 %
Odobenus rosmarus divergens	Pacific walrus	XP_012422579	530 aa	51 %
Mustela putorius furo	Ferret	XP_004777306	544 aa	50 %
Lipotes vexillifer	Chinese river dolphin	XP_007452050	529 aa	45 %
Ovis areis	Sheep	XP_004022229	536 aa	45 %
Capra hircus	Goat	XP_005700711	538 aa	44 %
Myotis lucifugus	Little brown bat	XP_006083036	500 aa	42 %
Myotis davidii	David's myotis	XP_006759573	495 aa	42 %
Bos taurus	Cattle	NP_001092664	534 aa	42 %
Equus asinus	Asinus	XP_014707878	723 aa	42 %
Trichechus manatus latirostris	Florida manatee	XP_012415455	505 aa	44 %
Dasypus novemcinctus	Nine-banded armadillo	XP_004475873	497 aa	44 %
Orycteropus afer afer	Aardvark	XP_007957133	477 aa	38 %

=== Phylogeny ===
CXorf49 has developed from aardvarks, to the human protein over 105.0 million years.

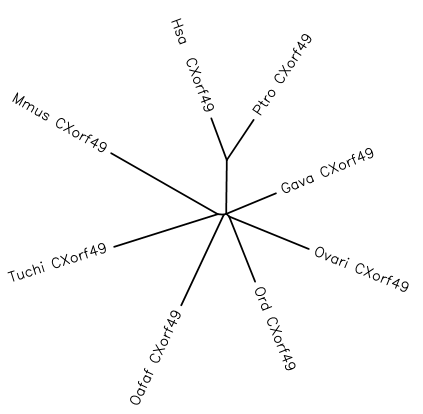
This phylogenetic tree made with CRUSTALW on SDSC Biology Workbench shows how CXorf49 in Human (Hsa), Chimpanzee(Ptro), Malayan flying lemur(Gava), Sheep (Ovari), Pacific walrus(Ord), Aardvark(Oafaf), Chinese tree shrew (Tuchi) and House mouse(Mmus) has diverged over time.
