= Ribose 1,5-bisphosphate phosphokinase =

Identifiers
- EC no.: 2.7.4.23

Databases
- IntEnz: IntEnz view
- BRENDA: BRENDA entry
- ExPASy: NiceZyme view
- KEGG: KEGG entry
- MetaCyc: metabolic pathway
- PRIAM: profile
- PDB structures: RCSB PDB PDBe PDBsum
Search
- PMC: articles
- PubMed: articles
- NCBI: proteins

Ribose 1,5-bisphosphate phosphokinase (EC 2.7.4.23) is an enzyme that catalyzes the chemical reaction

D-ribose 1,5-bisphosphate
ATP
ADP
ATP
ADP
phosphoribosyl pyrophosphate

The enzyme characterised from a mutant Escherichia coli converts D-ribose 1,5-bisphosphate to phosphoribosyl pyrophosphate by transferring a phosphate group from the cofactor, adenosine triphosphate (ATP), which is converted to adenosine diphosphate (ADP).

This enzyme is a transferase, specifically one transferring phosphorus-containing groups (phosphotransferases) with a phosphate group as acceptor. The systematic name of this enzyme class is ATP:ribose-1,5-bisphosphate phosphotransferase. Other names in common use include ribose 1,5-bisphosphokinase, and PhnN.
