= Riboflavin phosphotransferase =

Identifiers
- EC no.: 2.7.1.42
- CAS no.: 9026-26-0

Databases
- IntEnz: IntEnz view
- BRENDA: BRENDA entry
- ExPASy: NiceZyme view
- KEGG: KEGG entry
- MetaCyc: metabolic pathway
- PRIAM: profile
- PDB structures: RCSB PDB PDBe PDBsum
- Gene Ontology: AmiGO / QuickGO
Search
- PMC: articles
- PubMed: articles
- NCBI: proteins

Riboflavin phosphotransferase (EC 2.7.1.42) is an enzyme that catalyzes the chemical reaction

riboflavin
+
glucose 1-phosphate
flavin mononucleotide
+
D-glucose

The two substrates of this enzyme characterised from Escherichia coli are riboflavin and glucose 1-phosphate. Its products are flavin mononucleotide and D-glucose.

This enzyme is a transferase, specifically one transferring phosphorus-containing groups (phosphotransferases) with an alcohol group as acceptor. The systematic name of this enzyme class is alpha-D-glucose-1-phosphate:riboflavin 5'-phosphotransferase. Other names in common use include riboflavine phosphotransferase, glucose-1-phosphate phosphotransferase, G-1-P phosphotransferase, and D-glucose-1-phosphate:riboflavin 5'-phosphotransferase.
