= Phosphatidylinositol-3,4-bisphosphate 4-phosphatase =

phosphatidylinositol-3,4-bisphosphate 4-phosphatase

Identifiers
- EC no.: 3.1.3.66
- CAS no.: 122653-78-5

Databases
- IntEnz: IntEnz view
- BRENDA: BRENDA entry
- ExPASy: NiceZyme view
- KEGG: KEGG entry
- MetaCyc: metabolic pathway
- PRIAM: profile
- PDB structures: RCSB PDB PDBe PDBsum
- Gene Ontology: AmiGO / QuickGO
Search
- PMC: articles
- PubMed: articles
- NCBI: proteins

The enzyme phosphatidylinositol-3,4-bisphosphate 4-phosphatase (EC 3.1.3.66) that catalyzes the reaction

1-phosphatidyl-myo-inositol 3,4-bisphosphate + H_{2}O $\rightleftharpoons$ 1-phosphatidyl-1D-myo-inositol 3-phosphate + phosphate

This enzyme belongs to the family of hydrolases, specifically those acting on phosphoric monoester bonds. The systematic name is 1-phosphatidyl-1D-myo-inositol-3,4-bisphosphate 4-phosphohydrolase. Other names in common use include inositol-3,4-bisphosphate 4-phosphatase, D-myo-inositol-3,4-bisphosphate 4-phosphohydrolase, phosphoinositide 4-phosphatase, inositol polyphosphate 4-phosphatase, D-myo-inositol-3,4-bisphosphate 4-phosphohydrolase, and inositol polyphosphate 4-phosphatase type II. This enzyme participates in inositol phosphate metabolism and phosphatidylinositol signaling system.
