= Glucose 1,6-bisphosphate =

- α anomer

Names
- IUPAC name 1,6-Di-O-phosphono-D-glucopyranose
- Systematic IUPAC name [(3R,4S,5S,6R)-3,4,5-trihydroxy-6-(phosphonooxymethyl)oxan-2-yl] dihydrogen phosphate
- Other names Glucose 1,6-diphosphate

Identifiers
CAS Number	305-58-8
3D model (JSmol)	Interactive image
ChEBI	CHEBI:18148
ChemSpider	8580400 unspecified anomer; 74362 alpha anomer; 394563 beta anomer
KEGG	C01231
PubChem CID	82400
CompTox Dashboard (EPA)	DTXSID801014547
- InChI: InChI=1S/C6H14O12P2/c7-3-2(1-16-19(10,11)12)17-6(5(9)4(3)8)18-20(13,14)15/h2-9H,1H2,(H2,10,11,12)(H2,13,14,15)/t2-,3-,4+,5-,6-/m1/s1 Key: RWHOZGRAXYWRNX-VFUOTHLCSA-N
- SMILES: O=P(O)(O)OC[C@H]1O[C@H](OP(=O)(O)O)[C@H](O)[C@@H](O)[C@@H]1O

Properties
Chemical formula	C_{6}H_{14}O_{12}P_{2}
Molar mass	340.114 g·mol^{−1}
- Except where otherwise noted, data are given for materials in their standard state (at 25 °C [77 °F], 100 kPa). Infobox references

Glucose 1,6-bisphosphate is a derivative of glucose 1-phosphate. In the glycogenesis metabolic pathway, glucose 1,6-bisphosphate is an intermediate in the conversion of glucose 6-phosphate into glucose 1-phosphate by the enzyme glucose-1,6-bisphosphate synthase. It can be produced by phosphoglucokinase, which converts glucose 1-phosphate into glucose 1,6-bisphosphate.
