= GGDEF domain =

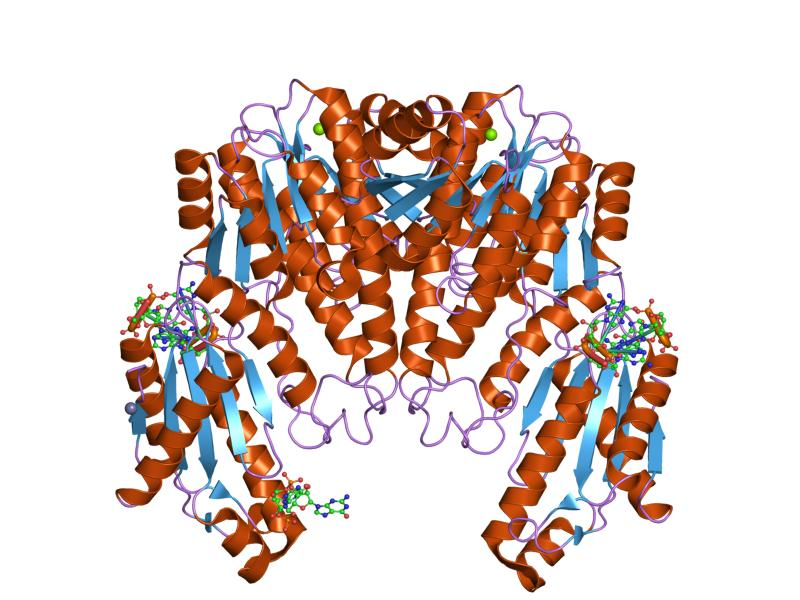
- response regulator PleD in complex with c-diGMP

Identifiers
- Symbol: GGDEF
- Pfam: PF00990
- Pfam clan: CL0276
- InterPro: IPR000160
- SCOP2: 1w25 / SCOPe / SUPFAM
- CDD: cd01949
Available protein structures:
- PDB: IPR000160 PF00990 (ECOD; PDBsum)
- AlphaFold: IPR000160; PF00990

In molecular biology, a GGDEF domain is a protein domain which appears to be ubiquitous in bacteria and is often linked to a regulatory domain, such as a phosphorylation receiver or oxygen sensing domain. Its function is to act as a diguanylate cyclase and synthesize cyclic di-GMP, which is used as an intracellular signalling molecule in a wide variety of bacteria. Enzymatic activity can be strongly influenced by the adjacent domains. Processes regulated by this domain include exopolysaccharide synthesis, biofilm formation, motility and cell differentiation.

Structural studies of PleD from Caulobacter crescentus show that this domain forms a five-stranded beta sheet surrounded by helices, similar to the catalytic core of adenylate cyclase.
