= Fructose 2,6-bisphosphate =

Names
- IUPAC name 2,6-Di-O-phosphono-β-D-fructofuranose

Identifiers
CAS Number	79082-92-1
3D model (JSmol)	Interactive image
ChEBI	CHEBI:28602
ChemSpider	94762
MeSH	fructose+2,6-bisphosphate
PubChem CID	105021
UNII	SE96VBE4LU
CompTox Dashboard (EPA)	DTXSID90897603
- InChI: InChI=1S/C6H14O12P2/c7-2-6(18-20(13,14)15)5(9)4(8)3(17-6)1-16-19(10,11)12/h3-5,7-9H,1-2H2,(H2,10,11,12)(H2,13,14,15)/t3-,4-,5+,6+/m1/s1 Key: YXWOAJXNVLXPMU-ZXXMMSQZSA-N
- SMILES: C([C@@H]1[C@H]([C@@H]([C@](O1)(CO)OP(=O)(O)O)O)O)OP(=O)(O)O

Properties
Chemical formula	C_{6}H_{14}O_{12}P_{2}
Molar mass	340.114 g·mol^{−1}
- Except where otherwise noted, data are given for materials in their standard state (at 25 °C [77 °F], 100 kPa). verify (what is ?) Infobox references

Fructose 2,6-bisphosphate, abbreviated Fru-2,6-P_{2}, is a metabolite that allosterically affects the activity of the enzymes phosphofructokinase 1 (PFK-1) and fructose 1,6-bisphosphatase (FBPase-1) to regulate glycolysis and gluconeogenesis. Fru-2,6-P_{2} itself is synthesized and broken down in either direction by the integrated bifunctional enzyme phosphofructokinase 2, also known as fructose 2,6-bisphosphotase (abbreviated PFK-2/FBPase-2), which contains kinase and phosphatase domains. Fru-2,6-P_{2} is an important regulator of glycolysis and gluconeogenesis and is itself hormonally regulated. Whether the kinase and phosphatase domains of PFK-2/FBPase-2 are active or inactive depends on the phosphorylation state of the enzyme.

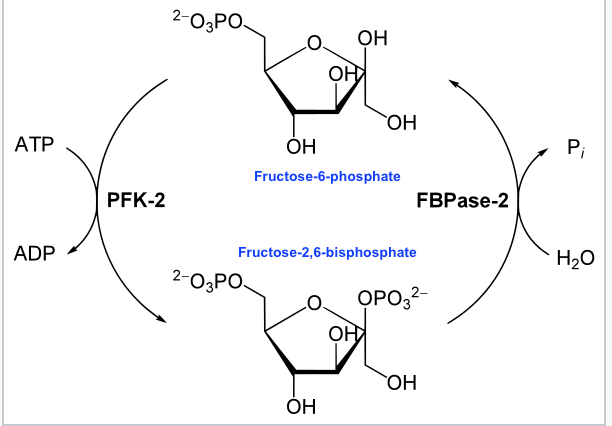
Diagram showing synthesis of Fru-2,6-P_{2}

The synthesis of Fru-2,6-P_{2} is performed when PFK-2/FBPase-2 is dephosphorylated, allowing the PFK-2 kinase domain to be active and phosphorylate fructose 6-phosphate using ATP. The breakdown of Fru-2,6-P_{2} is catalyzed by the phosphorylation of the bifunctional enzyme, which allows FBPase-2, the phosphatase domain, to dephosphorylate fructose 2,6-bisphosphate to produce fructose 6-phosphate and P_{i}.

It is important to distinguish that Fru-2,6-P_{2} is not the same as fructose 1,6-bisphosphate (Fru-1,6-P_{2}). Fru-1,6-P_{2} is an intermediate in the pathway of glycolysis. Fru-2,6-P_{2}, on the other hand, is not an intermediate molecule, but a regulatory metabolite for this pathway. The position of the phosphate group allows relevant enzymes to differentiate these molecules from one another.

== Effects on glucose metabolism ==
Fru-2,6-P_{2} strongly activates glucose breakdown in glycolysis through allosteric modulation (activation) of phosphofructokinase 1 (PFK-1). Elevated expression of Fru-2,6-P_{2} levels in the liver allosterically activates PFK-1 by increasing the enzyme’s affinity for fructose 6-phosphate, while simultaneously decreasing its affinity for inhibitory ATP and citrate. At physiological concentration, PFK-1 is almost completely inactive, but interaction with Fru-2,6-P_{2} activates the enzyme to stimulate glycolysis and enhance breakdown of glucose.

Cellular stress as a result of oncogenesis or DNA damage among others activates certain genes by the tumor suppressor p53. One such gene encodes TP53-inducible glycolysis and apoptosis regulator (TIGAR); an enzyme that inhibits glycolysis, monitors the cellular levels of reactive oxygen species, and protects cells from apoptosis. The structure of TIGAR is shown to be nearly identical to FBPase-2 on the bifunctional enzyme. TIGAR removes the allosteric effector, Fru-2,6-P_{2.}, therefore the activator does not enhance the affinity of the enzyme (PFK1) for its substrate (fructose 6-phosphate). Furthermore, TIGAR also removes the glycolytic intermediate fructose 1,6-bisphosphate, the product of the PFK catalyzed third reaction of glycolysis and the substrate for the following aldolase fourth reaction of glycolysis.

== Production regulation ==
The concentration of Fru-2,6-P_{2} in cells is controlled through regulation of the synthesis and breakdown by PFK-2/FBPase-2. The primary regulators of this are the hormones insulin, glucagon, and epinephrine which affect the enzyme through phosphorylation/dephosphorylation reactions.

Activation of the glucagon receptor (primarily coupled to G_{s}) triggers production of cyclic adenosine monophosphate (cAMP), which activates protein kinase A (PKA, or cAMP-dependent protein kinase). PKA phosphorylates the PFK-2/FBPase-2 enzyme at an NH_{2}-terminal Ser residue with ATP to activate the FBPase-2 activity and inhibit the PFK-2 activity of the enzyme, thus reducing levels of Fru-2,6-P_{2} in the cell. With decreasing amounts of Fru-2,6-P_{2}, glycolysis becomes inhibited while gluconeogenesis is activated.

Insulin triggers the opposite response by activating protein phosphatases that dephosphorylate PFK-2, thereby inhibiting the FBPase-2 domain. With additional Fru-2,6-P_{2} present, activation of PFK-1 occurs to stimulate glycolysis while inhibiting gluconeogenesis. As of 2023, which specific phosphatases are involved in mediating insulin's downstream effect specifically on PFK-2 are currently unclear; protein phosphatase 1 is known to be involved in mediating insulin's downstream effect of dephosphorylating glycogen synthase, thereby activating it.

== Regulation of sucrose production ==
Fru-2,6-P_{2} plays an important role in the regulation of triose phosphates, the end products of the Calvin Cycle. In the Calvin Cycle, 5/6th of triose phosphates are recycled to make ribulose 1,5-bisphosphate. The remaining 1/6 of triose phosphate can be converted into sucrose or stored as starch. Fru-2,6-P_{2} inhibits production of fructose 6-phosphate, a necessary element for sucrose synthesis. When the rate of photosynthesis in the light reactions is high, triose phosphates are constantly produced and the production of Fru-2,6-P_{2} is inhibited, thus producing sucrose. Fru-2,6-P_{2} production is activated when plants are in the dark and photosynthesis and triose phosphates are not produced.

== See also ==
- Fructose 2,6-bisphosphatase
- Fructose 1,6-bisphosphate
