= EAL domain =

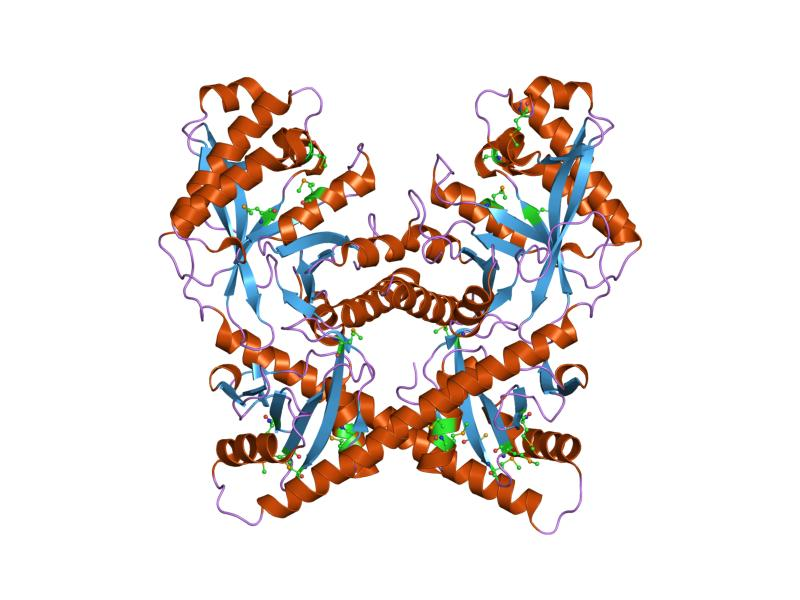
- crystal structure of the bacillus subtilis ykui protein, with an eal domain.

Identifiers
- Symbol: EAL
- Pfam: PF00563
- InterPro: IPR001633
- CDD: cd01948
Available protein structures:
- Pfam: structures / ECOD
- PDB: RCSB PDB; PDBe; PDBj
- PDBsum: structure summary

In molecular biology, the EAL domain is a conserved protein domain. It is found in diverse bacterial signalling proteins. It is named EAL after its conserved residues. The EAL domain may function as a diguanylate phosphodiesterase. The domain contains many conserved acidic residues that could participate in metal binding and might form the phosphodiesterase active site.
