= List of EC numbers (EC 4) =

This list contains a list of EC numbers for the fourth group, EC 4, lyases, placed in numerical order as determined by the Nomenclature Committee of the International Union of Biochemistry and Molecular Biology. All official information is tabulated at the website of the committee. The database is developed and maintained by Andrew McDonald.

== EC 4.1: Carbon-Carbon Lyases ==
=== EC 4.1.1: Carboxy-lyases ===
- EC 4.1.1.1: pyruvate decarboxylase
- EC 4.1.1.2: oxalate decarboxylase
- EC 4.1.1.3: Now recognized to be two enzymes EC 7.2.4.2 [oxaloacetate decarboxylase (Na^{+} extruding)] and EC 4.1.1.112 (oxaloacetate decarboxylase).
- EC 4.1.1.4: acetoacetate decarboxylase
- EC 4.1.1.5: acetolactate decarboxylase
- EC 4.1.1.6: cis-aconitate decarboxylase
- EC 4.1.1.7: benzoylformate decarboxylase
- EC 4.1.1.8: oxalyl-CoA decarboxylase
- EC 4.1.1.9: malonyl-CoA decarboxylase
- EC 4.1.1.10: Now included with EC 4.1.1.12, aspartate 4-decarboxylase
- EC 4.1.1.11: aspartate 1-decarboxylase
- EC 4.1.1.12: aspartate 4-decarboxylase
- EC 4.1.1.13: deleted
- EC 4.1.1.14: valine decarboxylase
- EC 4.1.1.15: glutamate decarboxylase
- EC 4.1.1.16: hydroxyglutamate decarboxylase
- EC 4.1.1.17: ornithine decarboxylase
- EC 4.1.1.18: lysine decarboxylase
- EC 4.1.1.19: arginine decarboxylase
- EC 4.1.1.20: diaminopimelate decarboxylase
- EC 4.1.1.21: phosphoribosylaminoimidazole carboxylase
- EC 4.1.1.22: histidine decarboxylase
- EC 4.1.1.23: orotidine-5′-phosphate decarboxylase
- EC 4.1.1.24: aminobenzoate decarboxylase
- EC 4.1.1.25: tyrosine decarboxylase
- EC 4.1.1.26: Now included with EC 4.1.1.28 aromatic-L-amino-acid decarboxylase
- EC 4.1.1.27: Now included with EC 4.1.1.28 aromatic-L-amino-acid decarboxylase
- EC 4.1.1.28: aromatic-L-amino-acid decarboxylase
- EC 4.1.1.29: sulfoalanine decarboxylase
- EC 4.1.1.30: pantothenoylcysteine decarboxylase
- EC 4.1.1.31: phosphoenolpyruvate carboxylase
- EC 4.1.1.32: phosphoenolpyruvate carboxykinase (GTP)
- EC 4.1.1.33: diphosphomevalonate decarboxylase
- EC 4.1.1.34: dehydro-L-gulonate decarboxylase
- EC 4.1.1.35: UDP-glucuronate decarboxylase
- EC 4.1.1.36: phosphopantothenoylcysteine decarboxylase
- EC 4.1.1.37: uroporphyrinogen decarboxylase
- EC 4.1.1.38: phosphoenolpyruvate carboxykinase (diphosphate)
- EC 4.1.1.39: ribulose-bisphosphate carboxylase
- EC 4.1.1.40: hydroxypyruvate decarboxylase
- EC 4.1.1.41: Now EC 7.2.4.3, (S)-methylmalonyl-CoA decarboxylase
- EC 4.1.1.42: carnitine decarboxylase
- EC 4.1.1.43: phenylpyruvate decarboxylase
- EC 4.1.1.44: 4-carboxymuconolactone decarboxylase
- EC 4.1.1.45: aminocarboxymuconate-semialdehyde decarboxylase
- EC 4.1.1.46: o-pyrocatechuate decarboxylase
- EC 4.1.1.47: tartronate-semialdehyde synthase
- EC 4.1.1.48: indole-3-glycerol-phosphate synthase
- EC 4.1.1.49: phosphoenolpyruvate carboxykinase (ATP)
- EC 4.1.1.50: adenosylmethionine decarboxylase
- EC 4.1.1.51: 3-hydroxy-2-methylpyridine-4,5-dicarboxylate 4-decarboxylase
- EC 4.1.1.52: 6-methylsalicylate decarboxylase
- EC 4.1.1.53: phenylalanine decarboxylase
- EC 4.1.1.54: dihydroxyfumarate decarboxylase
- EC 4.1.1.55: 4,5-dihydroxyphthalate decarboxylase
- EC 4.1.1.56: 3-oxolaurate decarboxylase
- EC 4.1.1.57: methionine decarboxylase
- EC 4.1.1.58: orsellinate decarboxylase
- EC 4.1.1.59: gallate decarboxylase
- EC 4.1.1.60: stipitatonate decarboxylase
- EC 4.1.1.61: 4-hydroxybenzoate decarboxylase
- EC 4.1.1.62: gentisate decarboxylase
- EC 4.1.1.63: protocatechuate decarboxylase
- EC 4.1.1.64: 2,2-dialkylglycine decarboxylase (pyruvate)
- EC 4.1.1.65: phosphatidylserine decarboxylase
- EC 4.1.1.66: uracil-5-carboxylate decarboxylase
- EC 4.1.1.67: UDP-galacturonate decarboxylase
- EC 4.1.1.68: 5-oxopent-3-ene-1,2,5-tricarboxylate decarboxylase
- EC 4.1.1.69: 3,4-dihydroxyphthalate decarboxylase
- EC 4.1.1.70: Now EC 7.2.4.5, glutaconyl-CoA decarboxylase
- EC 4.1.1.71: 2-oxoglutarate decarboxylase
- EC 4.1.1.72: branched-chain-2-oxoacid decarboxylase
- EC 4.1.1.73: tartrate decarboxylase
- EC 4.1.1.74: indolepyruvate decarboxylase
- EC 4.1.1.75: 5-guanidino-2-oxopentanoate decarboxylase
- EC 4.1.1.76: arylmalonate decarboxylase
- EC 4.1.1.77: 4-oxalocrotonate decarboxylase
- EC 4.1.1.78: acetylenedicarboxylate decarboxylase
- EC 4.1.1.79: sulfopyruvate decarboxylase
- EC 4.1.1.80: 4-hydroxyphenylpyruvate decarboxylase
- EC 4.1.1.81: threonine-phosphate decarboxylase
- EC 4.1.1.82: phosphonopyruvate decarboxylase
- EC 4.1.1.83: 4-hydroxyphenylacetate decarboxylase
- EC 4.1.1.84: D-dopachrome decarboxylase
- EC 4.1.1.85: 3-dehydro-L-gulonate-6-phosphate decarboxylase
- EC 4.1.1.86: diaminobutyrate decarboxylase
- EC 4.1.1.87: malonyl-S-ACP decarboxylase
- EC 4.1.1.88: biotin-independent malonate decarboxylase
- EC 4.1.1.89: Now EC 7.2.4.4 EC 7.2.4.4, biotin-dependent malonate decarboxylase
- EC 4.1.1.90: peptidyl-glutamate 4-carboxylase
- EC 4.1.1.91: salicylate decarboxylase
- EC 4.1.1.92: indole-3-carboxylate decarboxylase
- EC 4.1.1.93: pyrrole-2-carboxylate decarboxylase
- EC 4.1.1.94: ethylmalonyl-CoA decarboxylase
- EC 4.1.1.95: L-glutamyl-[BtrI acyl-carrier protein] decarboxylase
- EC 4.1.1.96: carboxynorspermidine decarboxylase
- EC 4.1.1.97: 2-oxo-4-hydroxy-4-carboxy-5-ureidoimidazoline decarboxylase
- EC 4.1.1.98: 4-hydroxy-3-polyprenylbenzoate decarboxylase
- EC 4.1.1.99: phosphomevalonate decarboxylase
- EC 4.1.1.100: prephenate decarboxylase
- EC 4.1.1.101: malolactic enzyme
- EC 4.1.1.102: phenacrylate decarboxylase
- EC 4.1.1.103: γ-resorcylate decarboxylase
- EC 4.1.1.104: 3-dehydro-4-phosphotetronate decarboxylase
- EC 4.1.1.105: L-tryptophan decarboxylase
- EC 4.1.1.106: fatty acid photodecarboxylase
- EC 4.1.1.107: 3,4-dihydroxyphenylacetaldehyde synthase
- EC 4.1.1.108: 4-hydroxyphenylacetaldehyde synthase
- EC 4.1.1.109: phenylacetaldehyde synthase
- EC 4.1.1.110: bisphosphomevalonate decarboxylase
- EC 4.1.1.111: siroheme decarboxylase
- EC 4.1.1.112: oxaloacetate decarboxylase
- EC 4.1.1.113: trans-aconitate decarboxylase
- EC 4.1.1.114: cis-3-alkyl-4-alkyloxetan-2-one decarboxylase
- EC 4.1.1.115: indoleacetate decarboxylase
- EC 4.1.1.116: D-ornithine/D-lysine decarboxylase
- EC 4.1.1.117: [[2-[(L-alanin-3-ylcarbamoyl)methyl]-2-hydroxybutanedioate decarboxylase|2-[(L-alanin-3-ylcarbamoyl)methyl]-2-hydroxybutanedioate decarboxylase]]
- EC 4.1.1.118: isophthalyl-CoA decarboxylase
- EC 4.1.1.119: phenylacetate decarboxylase
- EC 4.1.1.120: 3-oxoisoapionate decarboxylase
- EC 4.1.1.121: 3-oxoisoapionate-4-phosphate decarboxylase

=== EC 4.1.2: Aldehyde-lyases ===
- EC 4.1.2.1: Now included with EC 4.1.3.16 4-hydroxy-2-oxoglutarate aldolase
- EC 4.1.2.2: ketotetrose-phosphate aldolase
- EC 4.1.2.3: deleted, was pentosealdolase.
- EC 4.1.2.4: deoxyribose-phosphate aldolase
- EC 4.1.2.5: L-threonine aldolase
- EC 4.1.2.6: Deleted, reaction is due to EC 2.1.2.1, glycine hydroxymethyltransferase
- EC 4.1.2.7: Now included with EC 4.1.2.13 fructose-bisphosphate aldolase
- EC 4.1.2.8: indole-3-glycerol-phosphate lyase
- EC 4.1.2.9: phosphoketolase
- EC 4.1.2.10: (R)-mandelonitrile lyase
- EC 4.1.2.11: hydroxymandelonitrile lyase
- EC 4.1.2.12: 2-dehydropantoate aldolase
- EC 4.1.2.13: fructose-bisphosphate aldolase
- EC 4.1.2.14: 2-dehydro-3-deoxy-phosphogluconate aldolase
- EC 4.1.2.15: Now EC 2.5.1.54, 3-deoxy-7-phosphoheptulonate synthase
- EC 4.1.2.16: Now EC 2.5.1.55, 3-deoxy-8-phosphooctulonate synthase
- EC 4.1.2.17: L-fuculose-phosphate aldolase
- EC 4.1.2.18: 2-dehydro-3-deoxy-L-pentonate aldolase
- EC 4.1.2.19: rhamnulose-1-phosphate aldolase
- EC 4.1.2.20: 2-dehydro-3-deoxyglucarate aldolase
- EC 4.1.2.21: 2-dehydro-3-deoxy-6-phosphogalactonate aldolase
- EC 4.1.2.22: fructose-6-phosphate phosphoketolase
- EC 4.1.2.23: 3-deoxy-D-manno-octulosonate aldolase
- EC 4.1.2.24: dimethylaniline-N-oxide aldolase
- EC 4.1.2.25: dihydroneopterin aldolase
- EC 4.1.2.26: phenylserine aldolase
- EC 4.1.2.27: sphinganine-1-phosphate aldolase
- EC 4.1.2.28: 2-dehydro-3-deoxy-D-pentonate aldolase
- EC 4.1.2.29: 5-dehydro-2-deoxyphosphogluconate aldolase
- EC 4.1.2.30: Now EC 1.14.14.32}, 17α-hydroxyprogesterone deacetylase
- EC 4.1.2.31: Now included with EC 4.1.3.16 4-hydroxy-2-oxoglutarate aldolase
- EC 4.1.2.32: trimethylamine-oxide aldolase
- EC 4.1.2.33: fucosterol-epoxide lyase
- EC 4.1.2.34: 4-(2-carboxyphenyl)-2-oxobut-3-enoate aldolase
- EC 4.1.2.35: propioin synthase
- EC 4.1.2.36: lactate aldolase
- EC 4.1.2.37: Now covered by EC 4.1.2.46 [aliphatic (R)-hydroxynitrile lyase] and EC 4.1.2.47 [(S)-hydroxynitrile ketone-lyase (cyanide forming)]
- EC 4.1.2.38: benzoin aldolase
- EC 4.1.2.39: Deleted, identical to EC 4.1.2.37, hydroxynitrilase
- EC 4.1.2.40: tagatose-bisphosphate aldolase
- EC 4.1.2.41: Now included with EC 4.1.2.61, feruloyl-CoA hydratase/lyase
- EC 4.1.2.42: D-threonine aldolase
- EC 4.1.2.43: 3-hexulose-6-phosphate synthase
- EC 4.1.2.44: benzoyl-CoA-dihydrodiol lyase
- EC 4.1.2.45: trans-o-hydroxybenzylidenepyruvate hydratase-aldolase
- EC 4.1.2.46: aliphatic (R)-hydroxynitrile lyase
- EC 4.1.2.47: (S)-hydroxynitrile lyase
- EC 4.1.2.48: low-specificity L-threonine aldolase
- EC 4.1.2.49: L-allo-threonine aldolase
- EC 4.1.2.50: 6-carboxytetrahydropterin synthase
- * EC 4.1.2.50: 6-carboxytetrahydropterin synthase
- * EC 4.1.2.51: 2-dehydro-3-deoxy-D-gluconate aldolase
- * EC 4.1.2.52: 4-hydroxy-2-oxoheptanedioate aldolase
- * EC 4.1.2.53: 2-keto-3-deoxy-L-rhamnonate aldolase
- * EC 4.1.2.54: L-threo-3-deoxy-hexylosonate aldolase
- * EC 4.1.2.55: 2-dehydro-3-deoxy-phosphogluconate/2-dehydro-3-deoxy-6-phosphogalactonate aldolase
- * EC 4.1.2.56: 2-amino-4,5-dihydroxy-6-oxo-7-(phosphooxy)heptanoate synthase
- * EC 4.1.2.57: sulfofructosephosphate aldolase
- * EC 4.1.2.58: 2-dehydro-3,6-dideoxy-6-sulfogluconate aldolase
- * EC 4.1.2.59: dihydroneopterin phosphate aldolase
- * EC 4.1.2.60: dihydroneopterin triphosphate aldolase
- * EC 4.1.2.61: feruloyl-CoA hydratase/lyase
- * EC 4.1.2.62: 5-deoxyribulose 1-phosphate aldolase
- * EC 4.1.2.63: 2-hydroxyacyl-CoA lyase

=== EC 4.1.3: Oxo-Acid-Lyases ===
- EC 4.1.3.1: isocitrate lyase
- EC 4.1.3.2: Now EC 2.3.3.9, malate synthase
- EC 4.1.3.3: N-acetylneuraminate lyase
- EC 4.1.3.4: hydroxymethylglutaryl-CoA lyase
- EC 4.1.3.5: Now EC 2.3.3.10, hydroxymethylglutaryl-CoA synthase
- EC 4.1.3.6: citrate (pro-3S)-lyase
- EC 4.1.3.7: Now EC 2.3.3.1, citrate (Si)-synthase
- EC 4.1.3.8: Now EC 2.3.3.8, ATP citrate synthase
- EC 4.1.3.9: Now EC 2.3.3.11, 2-hydroxyglutarate synthase
- EC 4.1.3.10: Now EC 2.3.3.7, 3-ethylmalate synthase
- EC 4.1.3.11: Now EC 2.3.3.12, 3-propylmalate synthase
- EC 4.1.3.12: Now EC 2.3.3.13, 2-isopropylmalate synthase
- EC 4.1.3.13: oxalomalate lyase
- EC 4.1.3.14: L-erythro-3-hydroxyaspartate aldolase
- EC 4.1.3.15: Now EC 2.2.1.5, 2-hydroxy-3-oxoadipate synthase
- EC 4.1.3.16: 4-hydroxy-2-oxoglutarate aldolase
- EC 4.1.3.17: 4-hydroxy-4-methyl-2-oxoglutarate aldolase
- EC 4.1.3.18: Now EC 2.2.1.6, acetolactate synthase
- EC 4.1.3.19: Now EC 2.5.1.56
- EC 4.1.3.20: Now EC 2.5.1.57
- EC 4.1.3.21: Now EC 2.3.3.14
- EC 4.1.3.22: citramalate lyase
- EC 4.1.3.23: Now EC 2.3.3.2, decylcitrate synthase
- EC 4.1.3.24: malyl-CoA lyase
- EC 4.1.3.25: (S)-citramalyl-CoA lyase
- EC 4.1.3.26: 3-hydroxy-3-isohexenylglutaryl-CoA lyase
- EC 4.1.3.27: anthranilate synthase
- EC 4.1.3.28: Now EC 2.3.3.3, citrate (Re)-synthase
- EC 4.1.3.29: Now EC 2.3.3.4, decylhomocitrate synthase
- EC 4.1.3.30: methylisocitrate lyase
- EC 4.1.3.31: Now EC 2.3.3.5, 2-methylcitrate synthase
- EC 4.1.3.32: 2,3-dimethylmalate lyase
- EC 4.1.3.33: Now EC 2.3.3.6
- EC 4.1.3.34: citryl-CoA lyase
- EC 4.1.3.35: (1-hydroxycyclohexan-1-yl)acetyl-CoA lyase
- EC 4.1.3.36: naphthoate synthase
- EC 4.1.3.37: Now EC 2.2.1.7, 1-deoxy-D-xylulose 5-phosphate synthase
- EC 4.1.3.38: aminodeoxychorismate lyase
- EC 4.1.3.39: 4-hydroxy-2-oxovalerate aldolase
- EC 4.1.3.40: chorismate lyase
- EC 4.1.3.41: 3-hydroxy-D-aspartate aldolase
- EC 4.1.3.42: (4S)-4-hydroxy-2-oxoglutarate aldolase
- EC 4.1.3.43: 4-hydroxy-2-oxohexanoate aldolase
- EC 4.1.3.44: tRNA 4-demethylwyosine synthase (AdoMet-dependent)
- EC 4.1.3.45: 3-hydroxybenzoate synthase
- EC 4.1.3.46: (R)-citramalyl-CoA lyase

=== EC 4.1.99: Other Carbon-Carbon Lyases ===
- EC 4.1.99.1: tryptophanase
- EC 4.1.99.2: tyrosine phenol-lyase
- EC 4.1.99.3: deoxyribodipyrimidine photo-lyase
- EC 4.1.99.4: Now EC 3.5.99.7, 1-aminocyclopropane-1-carboxylate deaminase
- EC 4.1.99.5: octadecanal decarbonylase
- EC 4.1.99.6: Now EC 4.2.3.6, trichodiene synthase
- EC 4.1.99.7: Now EC 4.2.3.9, aristolochene synthase
- EC 4.1.99.8: Now EC 4.2.3.14, pinene synthase
- EC 4.1.99.9: Now EC 4.2.3.15, myrcene synthase
- EC 4.1.99.10: Now EC 4.2.3.16, (4S)-limonene synthase
- EC 4.1.99.11: benzylsuccinate synthase
- EC 4.1.99.12: 3,4-dihydroxy-2-butanone-4-phosphate synthase
- EC 4.1.99.13: (6-4)DNA photolyase
- EC 4.1.99.14: spore photoproduct lyase
- EC 4.1.99.15: The activity is covered by EC 4.1.99.14, spore photoproduct lyase
- EC 4.1.99.16: geosmin synthase
- EC 4.1.99.17: phosphomethylpyrimidine synthase
- EC 4.1.99.18: Now known to be catalysed by the combined effect of EC 4.1.99.22, GTP 3,8-cyclase, and EC 4.6.1.17, cyclic pyranopterin monophosphate synthase
- EC 4.1.99.19: 2-iminoacetate synthase
- EC 4.1.99.20: 3-amino-4-hydroxybenzoate synthase
- EC 4.1.99.21: Now EC 4.2.3.153 (5-formylfuran-3-yl)methyl phosphate synthase.
- EC 4.1.99.22: GTP 3′,8-cyclase
- EC 4.1.99.23: 5-hydroxybenzimidazole synthase
- EC 4.1.99.24: L-tyrosine isonitrile synthase
- EC 4.1.99.25: L-tryptophan isonitrile synthase
- EC 4.1.99.26: [[3-amino-5-[(4-hydroxyphenyl)methyl]-4,4-dimethylpyrrolidin-2-one|3-amino-5-[(4-hydroxyphenyl)methyl]-4,4-dimethylpyrrolidin-2-one]]

== EC 4.2: Carbon-Oxygen Lyases ==
=== EC 4.2.1: Hydro-lyases ===
- EC 4.2.1.1: carbonic anhydrase
- EC 4.2.1.2: fumarate hydratase
- EC 4.2.1.3: aconitate hydratase
- EC 4.2.1.4: Now known to be a partial reaction catalysed by EC 4.2.1.3, aconitate hydratase
- EC 4.2.1.5: arabinonate dehydratase
- EC 4.2.1.6: galactonate dehydratase
- EC 4.2.1.7: altronate dehydratase
- EC 4.2.1.8: mannonate dehydratase
- EC 4.2.1.9: dihydroxy-acid dehydratase
- EC 4.2.1.10: 3-dehydroquinate dehydratase
- EC 4.2.1.11: phosphopyruvate hydratase (enolase)
- EC 4.2.1.12: phosphogluconate dehydratase
- EC 4.2.1.13: Now EC 4.3.1.17, L-serine ammonia-lyase
- EC 4.2.1.14: Now EC 4.3.1.18, D-serine ammonia-lyase
- EC 4.2.1.15: Identical with EC 4.4.1.1 cystathionine γ-lyase
- EC 4.2.1.16: Now EC 4.3.1.19, threonine ammonia-lyase
- EC 4.2.1.17: enoyl-CoA hydratase
- EC 4.2.1.18: methylglutaconyl-CoA hydratase
- EC 4.2.1.19: imidazoleglycerol-phosphate dehydratase
- EC 4.2.1.20: tryptophan synthase
- EC 4.2.1.21: Now EC 4.2.1.22 cystathionine β-synthase
- EC 4.2.1.22: cystathionine β-synthase
- EC 4.2.1.23: deleted, the reaction was due to a side-reaction of EC 4.2.1.22 cystathionine β-synthase
- EC 4.2.1.24: porphobilinogen synthase
- EC 4.2.1.25: L-arabinonate dehydratase
- EC 4.2.1.26: identical to EC 4.3.1.9, glucosaminate ammonia-lyase
- EC 4.2.1.27: acetylenecarboxylate hydratase
- EC 4.2.1.28: propanediol dehydratase
- EC 4.2.1.29: Now EC 4.99.1.6, indoleacetaldoxime dehydratase
- EC 4.2.1.30: glycerol dehydratase
- EC 4.2.1.31: maleate hydratase
- EC 4.2.1.32: L(+)-tartrate dehydratase
- EC 4.2.1.33: 3-isopropylmalate dehydratase
- EC 4.2.1.34: (S)-2-methylmalate dehydratase
- EC 4.2.1.35: (R)-2-methylmalate dehydratase
- EC 4.2.1.36: homoaconitate hydratase
- EC 4.2.1.37: Now EC 3.3.2.4, trans-epoxysuccinate hydrolase
- EC 4.2.1.38: Now EC 4.3.1.20, erythro-3-hydroxyaspartate ammonia-lyase
- EC 4.2.1.39: gluconate dehydratase
- EC 4.2.1.40: glucarate dehydratase
- EC 4.2.1.41: 5-dehydro-4-deoxyglucarate dehydratase
- EC 4.2.1.42: galactarate dehydratase
- EC 4.2.1.43: 2-dehydro-3-deoxy-L-arabinonate dehydratase
- EC 4.2.1.44: myo-inosose-2 dehydratase
- EC 4.2.1.45: CDP-glucose 4,6-dehydratase
- EC 4.2.1.46: dTDP-glucose 4,6-dehydratase
- EC 4.2.1.47: GDP-mannose 4,6-dehydratase
- EC 4.2.1.48: D-glutamate cyclase
- EC 4.2.1.49: urocanate hydratase
- EC 4.2.1.50: pyrazolylalanine synthase
- EC 4.2.1.51: prephenate dehydratase
- EC 4.2.1.52: Now EC 4.3.3.7, 4-hydroxy-2,3,4,5-tetrahydrodipicolinate synthase.
- EC 4.2.1.53: oleate hydratase
- EC 4.2.1.54: lactoyl-CoA dehydratase
- EC 4.2.1.55: 3-hydroxybutyryl-CoA dehydratase
- EC 4.2.1.56: itaconyl-CoA hydratase
- EC 4.2.1.57: isohexenylglutaconyl-CoA hydratase
- EC 4.2.1.58: The reaction described is covered by EC 4.2.1.59
- EC 4.2.1.59: 3-hydroxyacyl-[acyl-carrier-protein] dehydratase
- EC 4.2.1.60: 3-hydroxydecanoyl-(acyl-carrier-protein) dehydratase
- EC 4.2.1.61: The reaction described is covered by EC 4.2.1.59.
- EC 4.2.1.62: 5α-hydroxysteroid dehydratase
- EC 4.2.1.63: Now known to comprise two enzymes, microsomal epoxide hydrolase (EC 3.3.2.9) and soluble epoxide hydrolase (EC 3.3.2.10)
- EC 4.2.1.64: Now known to comprise two enzymes, microsomal epoxide hydrolase (EC 3.3.2.9) and soluble epoxide hydrolase (EC 3.3.2.10)
- EC 4.2.1.65: 3-cyanoalanine hydratase
- EC 4.2.1.66: cyanide hydratase
- EC 4.2.1.67: D-fuconate dehydratase
- EC 4.2.1.68: L-fuconate dehydratase
- EC 4.2.1.69: cyanamide hydratase
- EC 4.2.1.70: pseudouridylate synthase
- EC 4.2.1.71: identical to EC 4.2.1.27, acetylenecarboxylate hydratase
- EC 4.2.1.72: Now EC 4.1.1.78, acetylenedicarboxylate decarboxylase
- EC 4.2.1.73: protoaphin-aglucone dehydratase (cyclizing)
- EC 4.2.1.74: long-chain-enoyl-CoA hydratase
- EC 4.2.1.75: uroporphyrinogen-III synthase
- EC 4.2.1.76: UDP-glucose 4,6-dehydratase
- EC 4.2.1.77: trans-L-3-hydroxyproline dehydratase
- EC 4.2.1.78: Now EC 3.5.99.14, (S)-norcoclaurine synthase
- EC 4.2.1.79: 2-methylcitrate dehydratase
- EC 4.2.1.80: 2-oxopent-4-enoate hydratase
- EC 4.2.1.81: D(-)-tartrate dehydratase
- EC 4.2.1.82: xylonate dehydratase
- EC 4.2.1.83: 4-oxalmesaconate hydratase
- EC 4.2.1.84: nitrile hydratase
- EC 4.2.1.85: dimethylmaleate hydratase
- EC 4.2.1.86: identical to EC 4.2.1.98, 16α-hydroxyprogesterone dehydratase
- EC 4.2.1.87: octopamine dehydratase
- EC 4.2.1.88: synephrine dehydratase
- EC 4.2.1.89: The activity has now been shown to be due to EC 2.8.3.21, L-carnitine CoA-transferase and EC 4.2.1.149, crotonobetainyl-CoA hydratase
- EC 4.2.1.90: L-rhamnonate dehydratase
- EC 4.2.1.91: arogenate dehydratase
- EC 4.2.1.92: hydroperoxide dehydratase
- EC 4.2.1.93: ATP-dependent NAD(P)H-hydrate dehydratase
- EC 4.2.1.94: scytalone dehydratase
- EC 4.2.1.95: kievitone hydratase
- EC 4.2.1.96: 4a-hydroxytetrahydrobiopterin dehydratase
- EC 4.2.1.97: phaseollidin hydratase
- EC 4.2.1.98: 16α-hydroxyprogesterone dehydratase
- EC 4.2.1.99: 2-methylisocitrate dehydratase
- EC 4.2.1.100: cyclohexa-1,5-dienecarbonyl-CoA hydratase
- EC 4.2.1.101: Now included with EC 4.1.2.61, feruloyl-CoA hydratase/lyase
- EC 4.2.1.102: Now EC 4.2.1.100, cyclohexa-1,5-dienecarbonyl-CoA hydratase
- EC 4.2.1.103: cyclohexyl-isocyanide hydratase
- EC 4.2.1.104: cyanase
- EC 4.2.1.105: 2-hydroxyisoflavanone dehydratase
- EC 4.2.1.106: bile-acid 7α-dehydratase
- EC 4.2.1.107: 3α,7α,12α-trihydroxy-5β-cholest-24-enoyl-CoA hydratase
- EC 4.2.1.108: ectoine synthase
- EC 4.2.1.109: methylthioribulose 1-phosphate dehydratase
- EC 4.2.1.110: aldos-2-ulose dehydratase
- EC 4.2.1.111: 1,5-anhydro-D-fructose dehydratase
- EC 4.2.1.112: acetylene hydratase
- EC 4.2.1.113: o-succinylbenzoate synthase
- EC 4.2.1.114: methanogen homoaconitase
- EC 4.2.1.115: UDP-N-acetylglucosamine 4,6-dehydratase (configuration-inverting)
- EC 4.2.1.116: 3-hydroxypropionyl-CoA dehydratase
- EC 4.2.1.117: 2-methylcitrate dehydratase (2-methyl-trans-aconitate forming)
- EC 4.2.1.118: 3-dehydroshikimate dehydratase
- EC 4.2.1.119: enoyl-CoA hydratase 2
- EC 4.2.1.120: 4-hydroxybutanoyl-CoA dehydratase
- EC 4.2.1.121: colneleate synthase
- EC 4.2.1.122: tryptophan synthase (indole-salvaging)
- EC 4.2.1.123: tetrahymanol synthase
- EC 4.2.1.124: arabidiol synthase
- EC 4.2.1.125: dammarenediol II synthase
- EC 4.2.1.126: N-acetylmuramic acid 6-phosphate etherase
- EC 4.2.1.127: linalool dehydratase
- EC 4.2.1.128: lupan-3β,20-diol synthase
- EC 4.2.1.129: squalene—hopanol cyclase
- EC 4.2.1.130: D-lactate dehydratase
- EC 4.2.1.131: carotenoid 1,2-hydratase
- EC 4.2.1.132: 2-hydroxyhexa-2,4-dienoate hydratase
- EC 4.2.1.133: copal-8-ol diphosphate hydratase
- EC 4.2.1.134: very-long-chain (3R)-3-hydroxyacyl-CoA dehydratase
- EC 4.2.1.135: UDP-N-acetylglucosamine 4,6-dehydratase (configuration-retaining)
- EC 4.2.1.136: ADP-dependent NAD(P)H-hydrate dehydratase
- EC 4.2.1.137: sporulenol synthase
- EC 4.2.1.138: (+)-Caryolan-1-ol synthase
- EC 4.2.1.139: pterocarpan synthase
- EC 4.2.1.140: gluconate/galactonate dehydratase
- EC 4.2.1.141: 2-dehydro-3-deoxyD-arabinonate dehydratase
- EC 4.2.1.142: 5′-oxoaverantin cyclase
- EC 4.2.1.143: versicolorin B synthase
- EC 4.2.1.144: 3-amino-5-hydroxybenzoate synthase
- EC 4.2.1.145: capreomycidine synthase
- EC 4.2.1.146: L-galactonate dehydratase
- EC 4.2.1.147: 5,6,7,8-tetrahydromethanopterin hydro-lyase
- EC 4.2.1.148: 2-methylfumaryl-CoA hydratase
- EC 4.2.1.149: crotonobetainyl-CoA hydratase
- EC 4.2.1.150: short-chain-enoyl-CoA hydratase
- EC 4.2.1.151: chorismate dehydratase
- EC 4.2.1.152: hydroperoxy icosatetraenoate dehydratase
- EC 4.2.1.153: 3-methylfumaryl-CoA hydratase
- EC 4.2.1.154: tetracenomycin F2 cyclase
- EC 4.2.1.155: (methylthio)acryloyl-CoA hydratase
- EC 4.2.1.156: L-talarate dehydratase
- EC 4.2.1.157: (R)-2-hydroxyisocaproyl-CoA dehydratase
- EC 4.2.1.158: galactarate dehydratase (D-threo-forming)
- EC 4.2.1.159: dTDP-4-dehydro-6-deoxy-α-glucopyranose 2,3-dehydratase
- EC 4.2.1.160: 2,5-diamino-6-(5-phospho-D-ribosylamino)pyrimidin-4(3H)-one isomerase/dehydratase
- EC 4.2.1.161: bisanhydrobacterioruberin hydratase
- EC 4.2.1.162: 6-deoxy-6-sulfo-D-gluconate dehydratase
- EC 4.2.1.163: 2-oxo-hept-4-ene-1,7-dioate hydratase
- EC 4.2.1.164: dTDP-4-dehydro-2,6-dideoxy-D-glucose 3-dehydratase
- EC 4.2.1.165: chlorophyllide a 3^{1}-hydratase
- EC 4.2.1.166: phosphinomethylmalate isomerase
- EC 4.2.1.167: (R)-2-hydroxyglutaryl-CoA dehydratase
- EC 4.2.1.168: GDP-4-dehydro-6-deoxy-α-D-mannose 3-dehydratase
- EC 4.2.1.169: 3-vinyl bacteriochlorophyllide d 3^{1}-hydratase
- EC 4.2.1.170: 2-(ω-methylthio)alkylmalate dehydratase
- EC 4.2.1.171: cis-L-3-hydroxyproline dehydratase
- EC 4.2.1.172: trans-4-hydroxy-L-proline dehydratase
- EC 4.2.1.173: ent-8α-hydroxylabd-13-en-15-yl diphosphate synthase
- EC 4.2.1.174: peregrinol diphosphate synthase
- EC 4.2.1.175: (R)-3-(aryl)lactoyl-CoA dehydratase
- EC 4.2.1.176: L-lyxonate dehydratase
- EC 4.2.1.177: (2S)-3-sulfopropanediol dehydratase
- EC 4.2.1.178: difructose-dianhydride-III synthase
- EC 4.2.1.179: difructose-anhydride synthase

=== EC 4.2.2: Acting on Polysaccharides ===
- EC 4.2.2.1: hyaluronate lyase
- EC 4.2.2.2: pectate lyase
- EC 4.2.2.3: mannuronate-specific alginate lyase
- EC 4.2.2.4: Now known to comprise two enzymes: EC 4.2.2.20, chondroitin-sulfate-ABC endolyase and EC 4.2.2.21, chondroitin-sulfate-ABC exolyase
- EC 4.2.2.5: chondroitin AC lyase
- EC 4.2.2.6: oligogalacturonide lyase
- EC 4.2.2.7: heparin lyase
- EC 4.2.2.8: heparin-sulfate lyase
- EC 4.2.2.9: pectate disaccharide-lyase
- EC 4.2.2.10: pectin lyase
- EC 4.2.2.11: guluronate-specific alginate lyase
- EC 4.2.2.12: xanthan lyase
- EC 4.2.2.13: exo-(1→4)-α-D-glucan lyase
- EC 4.2.2.14: glucuronan lyase
- EC 4.2.2.15: anhydrosialidase
- EC 4.2.2.16: levan fructotransferase (DFA-IV-forming)
- EC 4.2.2.17: inulin fructotransferase (DFA-I-forming)
- EC 4.2.2.18: inulin fructotransferase (DFA-III-forming)
- EC 4.2.2.19: chondroitin B lyase
- EC 4.2.2.20: chondroitin-sulfate-ABC endolyase
- EC 4.2.2.21: chondroitin-sulfate-ABC exolyase
- EC 4.2.2.22: pectate trisaccharide-lyase
- EC 4.2.2.23: rhamnogalacturonan endolyase
- EC 4.2.2.24: rhamnogalacturonan exolyase
- EC 4.2.2.25: gellan lyase
- EC 4.2.2.26: oligo-alginate lyase
- EC 4.2.2.27: pectin monosaccharide-lyase

=== EC 4.2.3: Acting on phosphates ===
- EC 4.2.3.1: threonine synthase
- EC 4.2.3.2: ethanolamine-phosphate phospho-lyase
- EC 4.2.3.3: methylglyoxal synthase
- EC 4.2.3.4: 3-dehydroquinate synthase
- EC 4.2.3.5: chorismate synthase
- EC 4.2.3.6: trichodiene synthase
- EC 4.2.3.7: pentalenene synthase
- EC 4.2.3.8: casbene synthase
- EC 4.2.3.9: aristolochene synthase
- EC 4.2.3.10: (–)-endo-fenchol synthase
- EC 4.2.3.11: sabinene-hydrate synthase
- EC 4.2.3.12: 6-pyruvoyltetrahydropterin synthase
- EC 4.2.3.13: (+)-δ-cadinene synthase
- EC 4.2.3.14: Now covered by EC 4.2.3.119, (–)-α-pinene synthase, and EC 4.2.3.120, (–)-β-pinene synthase
- EC 4.2.3.15: myrcene synthase
- EC 4.2.3.16: (4S)-limonene synthase
- EC 4.2.3.17: taxadiene synthase
- EC 4.2.3.18: abietadiene synthase
- EC 4.2.3.19: ent-kaurene synthase
- EC 4.2.3.20: (R)-limonene synthase
- EC 4.2.3.21: vetispiradiene synthase
- EC 4.2.3.22: germacradienol synthase
- EC 4.2.3.23: germacrene-A synthase
- EC 4.2.3.24: amorpha-4,11-diene synthase
- EC 4.2.3.25: S-linalool synthase
- EC 4.2.3.26: R-linalool synthase
- EC 4.2.3.27: isoprene synthase
- EC 4.2.3.28: ent-cassa-12,15-diene synthase
- EC 4.2.3.29: ent-sandaracopimaradiene synthase
- EC 4.2.3.30: ent-pimara-8(14),15-diene synthase
- EC 4.2.3.31: ent-pimara-9(11),15-diene synthase
- EC 4.2.3.32: levopimaradiene synthase
- EC 4.2.3.33: stemar-13-ene synthase
- EC 4.2.3.34: stemod-13(17)-ene synthase
- EC 4.2.3.35: syn-pimara-7,15-diene synthase
- EC 4.2.3.36: terpentetriene synthase
- EC 4.2.3.37: epi-isozizaene synthase
- EC 4.2.3.38: α-bisabolene synthase
- EC 4.2.3.39: epi-cedrol synthase
- EC 4.2.3.40: (Z)-γ-bisabolene synthase
- EC 4.2.3.41: elisabethatriene synthase
- EC 4.2.3.42: aphidicolan-16β-ol synthase
- EC 4.2.3.43: fusicocca-2,10(14)-diene synthase
- EC 4.2.3.44: isopimara-7,15-diene synthase
- EC 4.2.3.45: phyllocladan-16α-ol synthase
- EC 4.2.3.46: α-farnesene synthase
- EC 4.2.3.47: β-farnesene synthase
- EC 4.2.3.48: (3S,6E)-nerolidol synthase
- EC 4.2.3.49: (3R,6E)-nerolidol synthase
- EC 4.2.3.50: (+)-α-santalene synthase [(2Z,6Z)-farnesyl diphosphate cyclizing]
- EC 4.2.3.51: β-phellandrene synthase (neryl-diphosphate-cyclizing)
- EC 4.2.3.52: (4S)-β-phellandrene synthase (geranyl-diphosphate-cyclizing)
- EC 4.2.3.53: (+)-endo-β-bergamotene synthase [(2Z,6Z)-farnesyl diphosphate cyclizing]
- EC 4.2.3.54: (–)-endo-α-bergamotene synthase [(2Z,6Z)-farnesyl diphosphate cyclizing]
- EC 4.2.3.55: (S)-β-bisabolene synthase
- EC 4.2.3.56: γ-humulene synthase
- EC 4.2.3.57: (–)-β-caryophyllene synthase
- EC 4.2.3.58: longifolene synthase
- EC 4.2.3.59: (E)-γ-bisabolene synthase
- EC 4.2.3.60: germacrene C synthase
- EC 4.2.3.61: 5-epiaristolochene synthase
- EC 4.2.3.62: (–)-γ-cadinene synthase [(2Z,6E)-farnesyl diphosphate cyclizing]
- EC 4.2.3.63: (+)-cubenene synthase
- EC 4.2.3.64: (+)-epicubenol synthase
- EC 4.2.3.65: zingiberene synthase
- EC 4.2.3.66: β-selinene cyclase
- EC 4.2.3.67: cis-muuroladiene synthase
- EC 4.2.3.68: β-eudesmol synthase
- EC 4.2.3.69: (+)-α-barbatene synthase
- EC 4.2.3.70: patchoulol synthase
- EC 4.2.3.71: (E,E)-germacrene B synthase
- EC 4.2.3.72: α-gurjunene synthase
- EC 4.2.3.73: valencene synthase
- EC 4.2.3.74: presilphiperfolanol synthase
- EC 4.2.3.75: (–)-germacrene D synthase
- EC 4.2.3.76: (+)-δ-selinene synthase
- EC 4.2.3.77: (+)-germacrene D synthase
- EC 4.2.3.78: β-chamigrene synthase
- EC 4.2.3.79: thujopsene synthase
- EC 4.2.3.80: α-longipinene synthase
- EC 4.2.3.81: exo-α-bergamotene synthase
- EC 4.2.3.82: α-santalene synthase
- EC 4.2.3.83: β-santalene synthase
- EC 4.2.3.84: 10-epi-γ-eudesmol synthase
- EC 4.2.3.85: α-eudesmol synthase
- EC 4.2.3.86: 7-epi-α-selinene synthase
- EC 4.2.3.87: α-guaiene synthase
- EC 4.2.3.88: viridiflorene synthase
- EC 4.2.3.89: (+)-β-caryophyllene synthase
- EC 4.2.3.90: 5-epi-α-selinene synthase
- EC 4.2.3.91: cubebol synthase
- EC 4.2.3.92: (+)-γ-cadinene synthase
- EC 4.2.3.93: δ-guaiene synthase
- EC 4.2.3.94: γ-curcumene synthase
- EC 4.2.3.95: (–)-α-cuprenene synthase
- EC 4.2.3.96: avermitilol synthase
- EC 4.2.3.97: (–)-δ-cadinene synthase
- EC 4.2.3.98: (+)-T-muurolol synthase
- EC 4.2.3.99: labdatriene synthase
- EC 4.2.3.100: bicyclogermacrene synthase
- EC 4.2.3.101: 7-epi-sesquithujene synthase
- EC 4.2.3.102: sesquithujene synthase
- EC 4.2.3.103: ent-isokaurene synthase
- EC 4.2.3.104: α-humulene synthase
- EC 4.2.3.105: tricyclene synthase
- EC 4.2.3.106: (E)-β-ocimene synthase
- EC 4.2.3.107: (+)-car-3-ene synthase
- EC 4.2.3.108: 1,8-cineole synthase
- EC 4.2.3.109: (–)-sabinene synthase
- EC 4.2.3.110: (+)-sabinene synthase
- EC 4.2.3.111: (–)-α-terpineol synthase
- EC 4.2.3.112: (+)-α-terpineol synthase
- EC 4.2.3.113: terpinolene synthase
- EC 4.2.3.114: γ-terpinene synthase
- EC 4.2.3.115: α-terpinene synthase
- EC 4.2.3.116: (+)-camphene synthase
- EC 4.2.3.117: (–)-camphene synthase
- EC 4.2.3.118: 2-methylisoborneol synthase
- EC 4.2.3.119: (-)-α-pinene synthase
- EC 4.2.3.120: (-)-β-pinene synthase
- EC 4.2.3.121: (+)-α-pinene synthase
- EC 4.2.3.122: (+)-β-pinene synthase
- EC 4.2.3.123: β-sesquiphellandrene synthase
- EC 4.2.3.124: 2-deoxy-scyllo-inosose synthase
- EC 4.2.3.125: α-muurolene synthase
- EC 4.2.3.126: γ-muurolene synthase
- EC 4.2.3.127: β-copaene synthase
- EC 4.2.3.128: β-cubebene synthase
- EC 4.2.3.129: (+)-sativene synthase
- EC 4.2.3.130: tetraprenyl-β-curcumene synthase
- EC 4.2.3.131: miltiradiene synthase
- EC 4.2.3.132: neoabietadiene synthase
- EC 4.2.3.133: α-copaene synthase
- EC 4.2.3.134: 5-phosphooxy-L-lysine phospho-lyase
- EC 4.2.3.135: Δ^{6}-protoilludene synthase
- EC 4.2.3.136: α-isocomene synthase
- EC 4.2.3.137: (E)-2-epi-β-caryophyllene synthase
- EC 4.2.3.138: (+)-epi-α-bisabolol synthase
- EC 4.2.3.139: valerena-4,7(11)-diene synthase
- EC 4.2.3.140: cis-abienol synthase
- EC 4.2.3.141: sclareol synthase
- EC 4.2.3.142: 7-epizingiberene synthase [(2Z,6Z)-farnesyl diphosphate cyclizing]
- EC 4.2.3.143: kunzeaol synthase
- EC 4.2.3.144: geranyllinalool synthase
- EC 4.2.3.145: ophiobolin F synthase
- EC 4.2.3.146: cyclooctat-9-en-7-ol synthase
- EC 4.2.3.147: pimaradiene synthase
- EC 4.2.3.148: cembrene C synthase
- EC 4.2.3.149: nephthenol synthase
- EC 4.2.3.150: cembrene A synthase
- EC 4.2.3.151: pentamethylcyclopentadecatrienol synthase
- EC 4.2.3.152: 2-epi-5-epi-valiolone synthase
- EC 4.2.3.153: (5-formylfuran-3-yl)methyl phosphate synthase
- EC 4.2.3.154: demethyl-4-deoxygadusol synthase
- EC 4.2.3.155: 2-epi-valiolone synthase
- EC 4.2.3.156: hydroxysqualene synthase
- EC 4.2.3.157: (+)-isoafricanol synthase
- EC 4.2.3.158: (–)-spiroviolene synthase
- EC 4.2.3.159: tsukubadiene synthase
- EC 4.2.3.160: (2S,3R,6S,9S)-(–)-protoillud-7-ene synthase
- EC 4.2.3.161: (3S)-(+)-asterisca-2(9),6-diene synthase
- EC 4.2.3.162: (–)-α-amorphene synthase
- EC 4.2.3.163: (+)-corvol ether B synthase
- EC 4.2.3.164: (+)-eremophilene synthase
- EC 4.2.3.165: (1R,4R,5S)-(–)-guaia-6,10(14)-diene synthase
- EC 4.2.3.166: (+)-(1E,4E,6S,7R)-germacra-1(10),4-dien-6-ol synthase
- EC 4.2.3.167: dolabella-3,7-dien-18-ol synthase
- EC 4.2.3.168: dolathalia-3,7,11-triene synthase
- EC 4.2.3.169: 7-epi-α-eudesmol synthase
- EC 4.2.3.170: 4-epi-cubebol synthase
- EC 4.2.3.171: (+)-corvol ether A synthase
- EC 4.2.3.172: 10-epi-juneol synthase
- EC 4.2.3.173: τ-cadinol synthase
- EC 4.2.3.174: (2E,6E)-hedycaryol synthase
- EC 4.2.3.175: 10-epi-cubebol synthase
- EC 4.2.3.176: sesterfisherol synthase
- EC 4.2.3.177: β-thujene synthase
- EC 4.2.3.178: stellata-2,6,19-triene synthase
- EC 4.2.3.179: guaia-4,6-diene synthase
- EC 4.2.3.180: pseudolaratriene synthase
- EC 4.2.3.181: selina-4(15),7(11)-diene synthase
- EC 4.2.3.182: pristinol synthase
- EC 4.2.3.183: nezukol synthase
- EC 4.2.3.184: 5-hydroxy-α-gurjunene synthase
- EC 4.2.3.185: ent-atiserene synthase
- EC 4.2.3.186: ent-13-epi-manoyl oxide synthase
- EC 4.2.3.187: (2Z,6E)-hedycaryol synthase
- EC 4.2.3.188: β-geranylfarnesene synthase
- EC 4.2.3.189: 9,13-epoxylabd-14-ene synthase
- EC 4.2.3.190: manoyl oxide synthase
- EC 4.2.3.191: cycloaraneosene synthase
- EC 4.2.3.192: labda-7,13(16),14-triene synthase
- EC 4.2.3.193: (12E)-labda-8(17),12,14-triene synthase
- EC 4.2.3.194: (–)-drimenol synthase
- EC 4.2.3.195: rhizathalene A synthase
- EC 4.2.3.196: dolabradiene synthase
- EC 4.2.3.197: eudesmane-5,11-diol synthase
- EC 4.2.3.198: α-selinene synthase
- EC 4.2.3.199: (–)-5-epieremophilene synthase
- EC 4.2.3.200: β-pinacene synthase
- EC 4.2.3.201: hydropyrene synthase
- EC 4.2.3.202: hydropyrenol synthase
- EC 4.2.3.203: isoelisabethatriene synthase
- EC 4.2.3.204: valerianol synthase
- EC 4.2.3.205: sodorifen synthase

=== EC 4.2.99: Other Carbon-Oxygen Lyases ===
- EC 4.2.99.1: Now EC 4.2.2.1, hyaluronate lyase
- EC 4.2.99.2: Now EC 4.2.3.1, threonine synthase
- EC 4.2.99.3: Now EC 4.2.2.2, pectate lyase
- EC 4.2.99.4: Now EC 4.2.2.3, poly(β-D-mannuronate) lyase
- EC 4.2.99.5: deleted
- EC 4.2.99.6: Now included with EC 4.2.2.4 (chondroitin ABC lyase) and EC 4.2.2.5 (chondroitin AC lyase)
- EC 4.2.99.7: Now EC 4.2.3.2, ethanolamine-phosphate phospho-lyase
- EC 4.2.99.8: Now EC 2.5.1.47, cysteine synthase
- EC 4.2.99.9: Now EC 2.5.1.48, cystathionine γ-synthase
- EC 4.2.99.10: Now EC 2.5.1.49 EC 2.5.1.49, O-acetylhomoserine aminocarboxypropyltransferase
- EC 4.2.99.11: Now EC 4.2.3.3, methylglyoxal synthase
- EC 4.2.99.12: carboxymethyloxysuccinate lyase
- EC 4.2.99.13: Now EC 2.5.1.50, zeatin 9-aminocarboxyethyltransferase
- EC 4.2.99.14: Now EC 2.5.1.51, β-pyrazolylalanine synthase
- EC 4.2.99.15: Now EC 2.5.1.52, L-mimosine synthase
- EC 4.2.99.16: Now EC 2.5.1.53, uracilylalanine synthase
- EC 4.2.99.17: Listed as EC 2.5.1.51, β-pyrazolylalanine synthase
- EC 4.2.99.18: DNA-(apurinic or apyrimidinic site) lyase
- EC 4.2.99.19: Now EC 4.4.1.23, 2-hydroxypropyl-CoM lyase
- EC 4.2.99.20: 2-succinyl-6-hydroxy-2,4-cyclohexadiene-1-carboxylate synthase
- EC 4.2.99.21: isochorismate lyase
- EC 4.2.99.22: tuliposide A-converting enzyme
- EC 4.2.99.23: tuliposide B-converting enzyme
- EC 4.2.99.24: thebaine synthase

== EC 4.3: Carbon-Nitrogen Lyases ==
=== EC 4.3.1: Ammonia-Lyases ===
- EC 4.3.1.1: aspartate ammonia-lyase
- EC 4.3.1.2: methylaspartate ammonia-lyase
- EC 4.3.1.3: histidine ammonia-lyase
- EC 4.3.1.4: formiminotetrahydrofolate cyclodeaminase
- EC 4.3.1.5: Now divided into EC 4.3.1.23 (tyrosine ammonia-lyase), EC 4.3.1.24 (phenylalanine ammonia-lyase) and EC 4.3.1.25 (phenylalanine/tyrosine ammonia-lyase)
- EC 4.3.1.6: β-alanyl-CoA ammonia-lyase
- EC 4.3.1.7: ethanolamine ammonia-lyase
- EC 4.3.1.8: Now EC 2.5.1.61, hydroxymethylbilane synthase
- EC 4.3.1.9: glucosaminate ammonia-lyase
- EC 4.3.1.10: serine-sulfate ammonia-lyase
- EC 4.3.1.11: Deleted: inadequately characterized
- EC 4.3.1.12: ornithine cyclodeaminase
- EC 4.3.1.13: carbamoyl-serine ammonia-lyase
- EC 4.3.1.14: 3-aminobutyryl-CoA ammonia-lyase
- EC 4.3.1.15: diaminopropionate ammonia-lyase
- EC 4.3.1.16: threo-3-hydroxy-L-aspartate ammonia-lyase
- EC 4.3.1.17: L-serine ammonia-lyase
- EC 4.3.1.18: D-serine ammonia-lyase
- EC 4.3.1.19: threonine ammonia-lyase
- EC 4.3.1.20: erythro-3-hydroxy-L-aspartate ammonia-lyase
- EC 4.3.1.21: identical to EC 4.3.1.9, glucosaminate ammonia-lyase
- EC 4.3.1.22: 3,4-dihydroxyphenylalanine reductive deaminase
- EC 4.3.1.23: tyrosine ammonia-lyase
- EC 4.3.1.24: phenylalanine ammonia-lyase
- EC 4.3.1.25: phenylalanine/tyrosine ammonia-lyase
- EC 4.3.1.26: Now EC 1.21.3.9, dichlorochromopyrrolate synthase
- EC 4.3.1.27: threo-3-hydroxy-D-aspartate ammonia-lyase
- EC 4.3.1.28: L-lysine cyclodeaminase
- EC 4.3.1.29: D-glucosaminate-6-phosphate ammonia-lyase
- EC 4.3.1.30: dTDP-4-amino-4,6-dideoxy-D-glucose ammonia-lyase
- EC 4.3.1.31: L-tryptophan ammonia lyase
- EC 4.3.1.32: 7,8-didemethyl-8-hydroxy-5-deazariboflavin synthase

=== EC 4.3.2: Amidine-Lyases ===
- EC 4.3.2.1: argininosuccinate lyase
- EC 4.3.2.2: adenylosuccinate lyase
- EC 4.3.2.3: ureidoglycolate lyase
- EC 4.3.2.4: purine imidazole-ring cyclase
- EC 4.3.2.5: peptidylamidoglycolate lyase
- EC 4.3.2.6: γ-L-glutamyl-butirosin B γ-glutamyl cyclotransferase
- EC 4.3.2.7: glutathione-specific γ-glutamylcyclotransferase
- EC 4.3.2.8: γ-glutamylamine cyclotransferase
- EC 4.3.2.9: γ-glutamylcyclotransferase
- EC 4.3.2.10: imidazole glycerol-phosphate synthase

=== EC 4.3.3: Amine-Lyases ===
- EC 4.3.3.1: 3-ketovalidoxylamine C-N-lyase
- EC 4.3.3.2: strictosidine synthase
- EC 4.3.3.3: deacetylisoipecoside synthase
- EC 4.3.3.4: deacetylipecoside synthase
- EC 4.3.3.5: 4′-demethylrebeccamycin synthase
- EC 4.3.3.6: pyridoxal 5′-phosphate synthase (glutamine hydrolysing)
- EC 4.3.3.7: 4-hydroxy-tetrahydrodipicolinate synthase
- EC 4.3.3.8: mimosinase

=== EC 4.3.99: Other Carbon-Nitrogen Lyases ===
- EC 4.3.99.1: Now EC 4.2.1.104, cyanate hydratase
- EC 4.3.99.2: Now EC 7.2.4.1, carboxybiotin decarboxylase
- EC 4.3.99.3: 7-carboxy-7-deazaguanine synthase
- EC 4.3.99.4: choline trimethylamine-lyase

== EC 4.4: Carbon-Sulfur Lyases ==
=== EC 4.4.1: Carbon-sulfur lyases (only sub-subclass identified to date) ===
- EC 4.4.1.1: cystathionine γ-lyase
- EC 4.4.1.2: homocysteine desulfhydrase
- EC 4.4.1.3: dimethylpropiothetin dethiomethylase
- EC 4.4.1.4: alliin lyase
- EC 4.4.1.5: lactoylglutathione lyase
- EC 4.4.1.6: Now included in EC 4.4.1.13, cysteine-S-conjugate β-lyase
- EC 4.4.1.7: Now included with EC 2.5.1.18 glutathione transferase
- EC 4.4.1.8: Now included in EC 4.4.1.13, cysteine-S-conjugate β-lyase
- EC 4.4.1.9: L-3-cyanoalanine synthase
- EC 4.4.1.10: cysteine lyase
- EC 4.4.1.11: methionine γ-lyase
- EC 4.4.1.12: deleted: activity due to EC 2.3.3.15, sulfoacetaldehyde acetyltransferase
- EC 4.4.1.13: cysteine-S-conjugate β-lyase
- EC 4.4.1.14: 1-aminocyclopropane-1-carboxylate synthase
- EC 4.4.1.15: D-cysteine desulfhydrase
- EC 4.4.1.16: selenocysteine lyase
- EC 4.4.1.17: holocytochrome-c synthase
- EC 4.4.1.18: Now EC 1.8.3.5, prenylcysteine oxidase
- EC 4.4.1.19: phosphosulfolactate synthase
- EC 4.4.1.20: leukotriene-C_{4} synthase
- EC 4.4.1.21: S-ribosylhomocysteine lyase
- EC 4.4.1.22: S-(hydroxymethyl)glutathione synthase
- EC 4.4.1.23: 2-hydroxypropyl-CoM lyase
- EC 4.4.1.24: (2R)-sulfolactate sulfo-lyase
- EC 4.4.1.25: L-cysteate sulfo-lyase
- EC 4.4.1.26: olivetolic acid cyclase
- EC 4.4.1.27: Now EC 3.13.1.5, carbon disulfide hydrolase
- EC 4.4.1.42: S-adenosyl-L-methionine lyase

== EC 4.5: Carbon-Halide Lyases ==
=== EC 4.5.1: Carbon-halide lyases (only sub-subclass identified to date) ===
- EC 4.5.1.1: DDT-dehydrochlorinase
- EC 4.5.1.2: 3-chloro-D-alanine dehydrochlorinase
- EC 4.5.1.3: dichloromethane dehalogenase
- EC 4.5.1.4: L-2-amino-4-chloropent-4-enoate dehydrochlorinase
- EC 4.5.1.5: S-carboxymethylcysteine synthase

== EC 4.6: Phosphorus-Oxygen Lyases ==
=== EC 4.6.1: Phosphorus-oxygen lyases (only sub-subclass identified to date) ===
- EC 4.6.1.1: adenylate cyclase
- EC 4.6.1.2: guanylate cyclase
- EC 4.6.1.3: Now EC 4.2.3.4, 3-dehydroquinate synthase
- EC 4.6.1.4: Now EC 4.2.3.5, chorismate synthase
- EC 4.6.1.5: Now EC 4.2.3.7, pentalenene synthase
- EC 4.6.1.6: cytidylate cyclase
- EC 4.6.1.7: Now EC 4.2.3.8, casbene synthase
- EC 4.6.1.8: Now EC 4.2.3.10, (-)-endo-fenchol synthase
- EC 4.6.1.9: Now Now EC 4.2.3.11, sabinene-hydrate synthase
- EC 4.6.1.10: Now EC 4.2.3.12, 6-pyruvoyltetrahydropterin synthase
- EC 4.6.1.11: Now EC 4.2.3.13, (+)-δ-cadinene synthase
- EC 4.6.1.12: 2-C-methyl-D-erythritol 2,4-cyclodiphosphate synthase
- EC 4.6.1.13: phosphatidylinositol diacylglycerol-lyase
- EC 4.6.1.14: glycosylphosphatidylinositol diacylglycerol-lyase
- EC 4.6.1.15: FAD-AMP lyase (cyclizing)
- EC 4.6.1.16: tRNA-intron lyase
- EC 4.6.1.17: cyclic pyranopterin monophosphate synthase
- EC 4.6.1.18: pancreatic ribonuclease
- EC 4.6.1.19: ribonuclease T_{2}
- EC 4.6.1.20: ribonuclease U_{2}
- EC 4.6.1.21: Enterobacter ribonuclease
- EC 4.6.1.22: Bacillus subtilis ribonuclease
- EC 4.6.1.23: ribotoxin *
- EC 4.6.1.24: ribonuclease T_{1}
- EC 4.6.1.25: bacteriophage T_{4} restriction endoribonuclease RegB

== EC 4.7: Carbon-phosphorus lyases ==
=== EC 4.7.1: Carbon-phosphorus lyases (only sub-subclass identified to date) ===
- EC 4.7.1.1 α-D ribose 1-methylphosphonate 5-phosphate C-P-lyase *

== EC 4.8: Nitrogen-oxygen lyases ==
=== EC 4.8.1: Hydro-lyases ===
- EC 4.8.1.1: L-piperazate synthase
- EC 4.8.1.2: aliphatic aldoxime dehydratase
- EC 4.8.1.3: indoleacetaldoxime dehydratase
- EC 4.8.1.4: phenylacetaldoxime dehydratase

== EC 4.98: ATP-independent chelatases ==
=== EC 4.98.1: Forming coordination complexes ===
- EC 4.98.1.1: protoporphyrin ferrochelatase

== EC 4.99: Other Lyases ==
=== EC 4.99.1: Sole sub-subclass for lyases that do not belong in the other subclasses ===
- EC 4.99.1.1: Now EC 4.98.1.1
- EC 4.99.1.2: alkylmercury lyase
- EC 4.99.1.3: sirohydrochlorin cobaltochelatase
- EC 4.99.1.4: sirohydrochlorin ferrochelatase
- EC 4.99.1.5: Now EC 4.8.1.2, aliphatic aldoxime dehydratase
- EC 4.99.1.6: Now EC 4.8.1.3, indoleacetaldoxime dehydratase
- EC 4.99.1.7: Now EC 4.8.1.4, phenylacetaldoxime dehydratase
- EC 4.99.1.8: heme ligase
- EC 4.99.1.9:: coproporphyrin ferrochelatase
- EC 4.99.1.10: magnesium dechelatase
- EC 4.99.1.11: sirohydrochlorin nickelchelatase
- EC 4.99.1.12: pyridinium-3,5-bisthiocarboxylic acid mononucleotide nickel chelatase
