= UDP-N-acetyl-alpha-D-glucosamine hydro-lyase =

UDP-N-acetyl-alpha-D-glucosamine hydro-lyase may refer to:

- UDP-N-acetylglucosamine 4,6-dehydratase (configuration-inverting), an enzyme
- UDP-N-acetylglucosamine 4,6-dehydratase (configuration-retaining), an enzyme
