= PHS1 =

PHS1 may refer to:

- PTGS1, an enzyme
- Very-long-chain (3R)-3-hydroxyacyl-(acyl-carrier protein) dehydratase, an enzyme
- Beta-phellandrene synthase (neryl-diphosphate-cyclizing), an enzyme
