= Threo-3-hydroxy-D-aspartate ammonia-lyase =

threo-3-hydroxy-D-aspartate ammonia-lyase

Identifiers
- EC no.: 4.3.1.27

Databases
- IntEnz: IntEnz view
- BRENDA: BRENDA entry
- ExPASy: NiceZyme view
- KEGG: KEGG entry
- MetaCyc: metabolic pathway
- PRIAM: profile
- PDB structures: RCSB PDB PDBe PDBsum
Search
- PMC: articles
- PubMed: articles
- NCBI: proteins

threo-3-Hydroxy-D-aspartate ammonia-lyase (EC 4.3.1.27, D-threo-3-hydroxyaspartate dehydratase) is an enzyme with systematic name threo-3-hydroxy-D-aspartate ammonia-lyase (oxaloacetate-forming). This enzyme catalyses the following chemical reaction

threo-3-hydroxy-D-aspartate $\rightleftharpoons$ oxaloacetate + NH_{3}

This enzyme is a pyridoxal-phosphate protein.
