= L-glutamyl-(BtrI acyl-carrier protein) decarboxylase =

Identifiers
- EC no.: 4.1.1.95

Databases
- IntEnz: IntEnz view
- BRENDA: BRENDA entry
- ExPASy: NiceZyme view
- KEGG: KEGG entry
- MetaCyc: metabolic pathway
- PRIAM: profile
- PDB structures: RCSB PDB PDBe PDBsum
Search
- PMC: articles
- PubMed: articles
- NCBI: proteins

L-glutamyl-(BtrI acyl-carrier protein) decarboxylase (EC 4.1.1.95, btrK (gene)) is an enzyme with systematic name L-glutamyl-(BtrI acyl-carrier protein) carboxy-lyase. This enzyme catalyses the following chemical reaction

L-glutamyl-[BtrI acyl-carrier protein] $\rightleftharpoons$ 4-amino butanoyl-[BtrI acyl-carrier protein] + CO_{2}

This enzyme binds pyridoxal 5'-phosphate.
