= Kievitone hydratase =

kievitone hydratase

Identifiers
- EC no.: 4.2.1.95

Databases
- IntEnz: IntEnz view
- BRENDA: BRENDA entry
- ExPASy: NiceZyme view
- KEGG: KEGG entry
- MetaCyc: metabolic pathway
- PRIAM: profile
- PDB structures: RCSB PDB PDBe PDBsum
- Gene Ontology: AmiGO / QuickGO
Search
- PMC: articles
- PubMed: articles
- NCBI: proteins

The enzyme kievitone hydratase (EC 4.2.1.95) catalyzes the chemical reaction

kievitone hydrate $\rightleftharpoons$ kievitone + H_{2}O

This enzyme belongs to the family of lyases, specifically the hydro-lyases, which cleave carbon-oxygen bonds. The systematic name of this enzyme class is kievitone-hydrate hydro-lyase (kievitone-forming). Other names in common use include KHase, and kievitone-hydrate hydro-lyase.
