= D-glutamate cyclase =

Identifiers
- EC no.: 4.2.1.48
- CAS no.: 37290-80-5

Databases
- IntEnz: IntEnz view
- BRENDA: BRENDA entry
- ExPASy: NiceZyme view
- KEGG: KEGG entry
- MetaCyc: metabolic pathway
- PRIAM: profile
- PDB structures: RCSB PDB PDBe PDBsum
- Gene Ontology: AmiGO / QuickGO
Search
- PMC: articles
- PubMed: articles
- NCBI: proteins

The enzyme D-glutamate cyclase (EC 4.2.1.48) catalyzes the chemical reaction

D-glutamate $\rightleftharpoons$ 5-oxo-Dproline + H_{2}O

This enzyme belongs to the family of lyases, specifically the hydro-lyases, which cleave carbon-oxygen bonds. The systematic name of this enzyme class is D-glutamate hydro-lyase (cyclizing; 5-oxo-D-proline-forming). This enzyme is also called D-glutamate hydro-lyase (cyclizing). This enzyme participates in D-glutamine and D-glutamate metabolism.
