= FAD-AMP lyase (cyclizing) =

Identifiers
- EC no.: 4.6.1.15
- CAS no.: 208349-48-8

Databases
- BRENDA: enzyme data
- ExPASy: NiceZyme view
- KEGG: enzyme entry
- MetaCyc: metabolic pathway
- Rhea: reactions
- PDB structures: RCSB PDB PDBe PDBsum
Search
- PMC: articles
- PubMed: articles
- NCBI: proteins

The enzyme FAD-AMP lyase (cyclizing) (EC 4.6.1.15) catalyzes the reaction

FAD $\rightleftharpoons$ AMP + riboflavin cyclic-4′,5′--phosphate

This enzyme belongs to the family of lyases, specifically the class of phosphorus-oxygen lyases. The systematic name of this enzyme class is FAD AMP-lyase (riboflavin-cyclic-4′,5′-phosphate-forming). Other names in common use include FMN cyclase and FAD AMP-lyase (cyclic-FMN-forming).
