= 2-methylisocitrate dehydratase =

Class of enzymes

Identifiers
- EC no.: 4.2.1.99
- CAS no.: 170780-51-5

Databases
- IntEnz: IntEnz view
- BRENDA: BRENDA entry
- ExPASy: NiceZyme view
- KEGG: KEGG entry
- MetaCyc: metabolic pathway
- PRIAM: profile
- PDB structures: RCSB PDB PDBe PDBsum
- Gene Ontology: AmiGO / QuickGO
Search
- PMC: articles
- PubMed: articles
- NCBI: proteins

The enzyme 2-methylisocitrate dehydratase (EC 4.2.1.99) catalyzes the chemical reaction

(2S,3R)-3-hydroxybutane-1,2,3-tricarboxylate $\rightleftharpoons$ (Z)-but-2-ene-1,2,3-tricarboxylate + H_{2}O

This enzyme belongs to the family of lyases, specifically the hydro-lyases, which cleave carbon-oxygen bonds. The systematic name of this enzyme class is (2S,3R)-3-hydroxybutane-1,2,3-tricarboxylate hydro-lyase [(Z)-but-2-ene-1,2,3-tricarboxylate-forming]. This enzyme is also called (2S,3R)-3-hydroxybutane-1,2,3-tricarboxylate hydro-lyase. This enzyme participates in propanoate metabolism.
