= Carboxymethyloxysuccinate lyase =

Class of enzymes

carboxymethyloxysuccinate lyase

Identifiers
- EC no.: 4.2.99.12
- CAS no.: 53167-89-8

Databases
- IntEnz: IntEnz view
- BRENDA: BRENDA entry
- ExPASy: NiceZyme view
- KEGG: KEGG entry
- MetaCyc: metabolic pathway
- PRIAM: profile
- PDB structures: RCSB PDB PDBe PDBsum
- Gene Ontology: AmiGO / QuickGO
Search
- PMC: articles
- PubMed: articles
- NCBI: proteins

The enzyme carboxymethyloxysuccinate lyase (EC 4.2.99.12) catalyzes the chemical reaction

carboxymethyloxysuccinate $\rightleftharpoons$ fumarate + glycolate

This enzyme belongs to the family of lyases, specifically the "catch-all" class of lyases that cleave carbon-oxygen bonds. The systematic name of this enzyme class is carboxymethyloxysuccinate glycolate-lyase (fumarate-forming). Other names in common use include carbon-oxygen lyase, and carboxymethyloxysuccinate glycolate-lyase.
