= Epi-cedrol synthase =

epi-cedrol synthase

Identifiers
- EC no.: 4.2.3.39

Databases
- IntEnz: IntEnz view
- BRENDA: BRENDA entry
- ExPASy: NiceZyme view
- KEGG: KEGG entry
- MetaCyc: metabolic pathway
- PRIAM: profile
- PDB structures: RCSB PDB PDBe PDBsum
Search
- PMC: articles
- PubMed: articles
- NCBI: proteins

epi-Cedrol synthase (EC 4.2.3.39, 8-epicedrol synthase, epicedrol synthase) is an enzyme with systematic name (2E,6E)-farnesyl-diphosphate diphosphate-lyase (8-epi-cedrol-forming). This enzyme catalyses the following chemical reaction

(2E,6E)-farnesyl diphosphate + H_{2}O $\rightleftharpoons$ 8-epi-cedrol + diphosphate

This enzyme is activated by Mg^{2+}.
