= 3-aminobutyryl-CoA ammonia-lyase =

Class of enzymes

Identifiers
- EC no.: 4.3.1.14
- CAS no.: 55467-41-9

Databases
- IntEnz: IntEnz view
- BRENDA: BRENDA entry
- ExPASy: NiceZyme view
- KEGG: KEGG entry
- MetaCyc: metabolic pathway
- PRIAM: profile
- PDB structures: RCSB PDB PDBe PDBsum
- Gene Ontology: AmiGO / QuickGO
Search
- PMC: articles
- PubMed: articles
- NCBI: proteins

The enzyme 3-aminobutyryl-CoA ammonia-lyase (EC 4.3.1.14) catalyzes the chemical reaction

L-3-aminobutyryl-CoA $\rightleftharpoons$ crotonoyl-CoA + NH_{3}

This enzyme belongs to the family of lyases, specifically ammonia lyases, which cleave carbon-nitrogen bonds. The systematic name of this enzyme class is L-3-aminobutyryl-CoA ammonia-lyase (crotonoyl-CoA-forming). Other names in common use include L-3-aminobutyryl-CoA deaminase, and L-3-aminobutyryl-CoA ammonia-lyase.
