= Protoaphin-aglucone dehydratase (cyclizing) =

Enzyme

protoaphin-aglucone dehydratase (cyclizing)

Identifiers
- EC no.: 4.2.1.73
- CAS no.: 64177-87-3

Databases
- IntEnz: IntEnz view
- BRENDA: BRENDA entry
- ExPASy: NiceZyme view
- KEGG: KEGG entry
- MetaCyc: metabolic pathway
- PRIAM: profile
- PDB structures: RCSB PDB PDBe PDBsum
- Gene Ontology: AmiGO / QuickGO
Search
- PMC: articles
- PubMed: articles
- NCBI: proteins

The enzyme protoaphin-aglucone dehydratase (cyclizing) (EC 4.2.1.73) catalyzes the chemical reaction

protoaphin aglucone $\rightleftharpoons$ xanthoaphin + H_{2}O

This enzyme belongs to the family of lyases, specifically the hydro-lyases, which cleave carbon-oxygen bonds. The systematic name of this enzyme class is protoaphin-aglucone hydro-lyase (cyclizing; xanthoaphin-forming). Other names in common use include protoaphin dehydratase, protoaphin dehydratase (cyclizing), and protoaphin-aglucone hydro-lyase (cyclizing).
