= 2-dehydro-3-deoxy-L-arabinonate dehydratase =

Class of enzymes

Identifiers
- EC no.: 4.2.1.43
- CAS no.: 37263-10-8

Databases
- IntEnz: IntEnz view
- BRENDA: BRENDA entry
- ExPASy: NiceZyme view
- KEGG: KEGG entry
- MetaCyc: metabolic pathway
- PRIAM: profile
- PDB structures: RCSB PDB PDBe PDBsum
- Gene Ontology: AmiGO / QuickGO
Search
- PMC: articles
- PubMed: articles
- NCBI: proteins

The enzyme 2-dehydro-3-deoxy-L-arabinonate dehydratase (EC 4.2.1.43) catalyzes the chemical reaction

2-dehydro-3-deoxy-L-arabinonate $\rightleftharpoons$ 2,5-dioxopentanoate + H_{2}O

This enzyme belongs to the family of lyases, specifically the hydro-lyases, which cleave carbon-oxygen bonds. The systematic name of this enzyme class is 2-dehydro-3-deoxy-L-arabinonate hydro-lyase (2,5-dioxopentanoate-forming). Other names in common use include 2-keto-3-deoxy-L-arabinonate dehydratase, and 2-dehydro-3-deoxy-L-arabinonate hydro-lyase. This enzyme participates in ascorbate and aldarate metabolism.
