= 3-hydroxypropionyl-CoA dehydratase =

Class of enzymes

Identifiers
- EC no.: 4.2.1.116

Databases
- IntEnz: IntEnz view
- BRENDA: BRENDA entry
- ExPASy: NiceZyme view
- KEGG: KEGG entry
- MetaCyc: metabolic pathway
- PRIAM: profile
- PDB structures: RCSB PDB PDBe PDBsum
Search
- PMC: articles
- PubMed: articles
- NCBI: proteins

3-hydroxypropionyl-CoA dehydratase (EC 4.2.1.116) is an enzyme with systematic name 3-hydroxypropionyl-CoA hydro-lyase. This enzyme catalyses the following chemical reaction

3-hydroxypropanoyl-CoA $\rightleftharpoons$ acrylyl-CoA + H_{2}O

This enzyme catalyses a step in the 3-hydroxypropionate/4-hydroxybutyrate cycle.
