= 5-phosphonooxy-L-lysine phospho-lyase =

Class of enzymes

Identifiers
- EC no.: 4.2.3.134

Databases
- IntEnz: IntEnz view
- BRENDA: BRENDA entry
- ExPASy: NiceZyme view
- KEGG: KEGG entry
- MetaCyc: metabolic pathway
- PRIAM: profile
- PDB structures: RCSB PDB PDBe PDBsum
Search
- PMC: articles
- PubMed: articles
- NCBI: proteins

5-Phosphonooxy-L-lysine phospho-lyase (EC 4.2.3.134, 5-phosphohydroxy-L-lysine ammoniophospholyase, AGXT2L2 (gene)) is an enzyme with systematic name (5R)-5-phosphonooxy-L-lysine phosphate-lyase (deaminating; (S)-2-amino-6-oxohexanoate-forming). This enzyme catalyses the following chemical reaction

(5R)-5-phosphonooxy-L-lysine + H_{2}O $\rightleftharpoons$ (S)-2-amino-6-oxohexanoate + NH_{3} + phosphate

This enzyme is a pyridoxal-phosphate protein.
