= 2-hydroxyhexa-2,4-dienoate hydratase =

Class of enzymes

Identifiers
- EC no.: 4.2.1.132

Databases
- IntEnz: IntEnz view
- BRENDA: BRENDA entry
- ExPASy: NiceZyme view
- KEGG: KEGG entry
- MetaCyc: metabolic pathway
- PRIAM: profile
- PDB structures: RCSB PDB PDBe PDBsum
Search
- PMC: articles
- PubMed: articles
- NCBI: proteins

2-hydroxyhexa-2,4-dienoate hydratase (EC 4.2.1.132, tesE (gene), hsaE (gene)) is an enzyme with systematic name 4-hydroxy-2-oxohexanoate hydro-lyase ((2Z,4Z)-2-hydroxyhexa-2,4-dienoate-forming). This enzyme catalyses the following chemical reaction

4-hydroxy-2-oxohexanoate $\rightleftharpoons$ (2Z,4Z)-2-hydroxyhexa-2,4-dienoate + H_{2}O

This enzyme catalyses a late step in the bacterial steroid degradation pathway.
