= Avermitilol synthase =

Identifiers
- EC no.: 4.2.3.96

Databases
- IntEnz: IntEnz view
- BRENDA: BRENDA entry
- ExPASy: NiceZyme view
- KEGG: KEGG entry
- MetaCyc: metabolic pathway
- PRIAM: profile
- PDB structures: RCSB PDB PDBe PDBsum
Search
- PMC: articles
- PubMed: articles
- NCBI: proteins

Avermitilol synthase (EC 4.2.3.96) is an enzyme with systematic name avermitilol hydrolase (cyclizing, avermitilol-forming). This enzyme catalyses the following chemical reaction

(2E,6E)-farnesyl diphosphate + H_{2}O $\rightleftharpoons$ avermitilol + diphosphate

This enzyme requires Mg^{2+}.
