= Rhamnogalacturonan exolyase =

Identifiers
- EC no.: 4.2.2.24

Databases
- IntEnz: IntEnz view
- BRENDA: BRENDA entry
- ExPASy: NiceZyme view
- KEGG: KEGG entry
- MetaCyc: metabolic pathway
- PRIAM: profile
- PDB structures: RCSB PDB PDBe PDBsum
Search
- PMC: articles
- PubMed: articles
- NCBI: proteins

Rhamnogalacturonan exolyase (EC 4.2.2.24, YesX) is an enzyme with systematic name α-L-rhamnopyranosyl-(1→4)-α-D-galactopyranosyluronate exolyase. This enzyme catalyses the following chemical reaction

Exotype eliminative cleavage of α-L-rhamnopyranosyl-(1→4)-α-D-galactopyranosyluronic acid bonds of rhamnogalacturonan I oligosaccharides containing α-L-rhamnopyranose at the reducing end and 4-deoxy-4,5-unsaturated D-galactopyranosyluronic acid at the non-reducing end. The products are the disaccharide 2-O-(4-deoxy-β-L-threo-hex-4-enopyranuronosyl)-α-Lrhamnopyranose and the shortened rhamnogalacturonan oligosaccharide containing one 4-deoxy-4,5-unsaturated D-galactopyranosyluronic acid at the non-reducing end.

The enzyme is part of the degradation system for rhamnogalacturonan I in Bacillus subtilis strain 168.
