= Alpha-farnesene synthase =

α-farnesene synthase

Identifiers
- EC no.: 4.2.3.46

Databases
- IntEnz: IntEnz view
- BRENDA: BRENDA entry
- ExPASy: NiceZyme view
- KEGG: KEGG entry
- MetaCyc: metabolic pathway
- PRIAM: profile
- PDB structures: RCSB PDB PDBe PDBsum
Search
- PMC: articles
- PubMed: articles
- NCBI: proteins

α-Farnesene synthase (EC 4.2.3.46, (E,E)-α-farnesene synthase, AFS1, MdAFS1) is an enzyme with systematic name (2E,6E)-farnesyl-diphosphate lyase ((3E,6E)-α-farnesene-forming). This enzyme catalyses the following chemical reaction

(2E,6E)-farnesyl diphosphate $\rightleftharpoons$ (3E,6E)-α-farnesene + diphosphate
