= Threo-3-hydroxyaspartate ammonia-lyase =

threo-3-hydroxyaspartate ammonia-lyase

Identifiers
- EC no.: 4.3.1.16

Databases
- IntEnz: IntEnz view
- BRENDA: BRENDA entry
- ExPASy: NiceZyme view
- KEGG: KEGG entry
- MetaCyc: metabolic pathway
- PRIAM: profile
- PDB structures: RCSB PDB PDBe PDBsum
- Gene Ontology: AmiGO / QuickGO
Search
- PMC: articles
- PubMed: articles
- NCBI: proteins

The enzyme threo-3-hydroxyaspartate ammonia-lyase (EC 4.3.1.16) is an enzyme that catalyzes the chemical reaction

threo-3-hydroxy-L-aspartate $\rightleftharpoons$ oxaloacetate + NH_{3}

== Nomenclature ==
This enzyme belongs to the family of lyases, specifically ammonia lyases, which cleave carbon-nitrogen bonds. The systematic name of this enzyme class is threo-3-hydroxy-L-aspartate ammonia-lyase (oxaloacetate-forming). Other names in common use include threo-3-hydroxyaspartate dehydratase, L-threo-3-hydroxyaspartate dehydratase, and threo-3-hydroxy-L-aspartate ammonia-lyase.
