= D-serine ammonia-lyase =

Type of enzyme (protein)

Identifiers
- EC no.: 4.3.1.18
- CAS no.: 9015-88-7

Databases
- IntEnz: IntEnz view
- BRENDA: BRENDA entry
- ExPASy: NiceZyme view
- KEGG: KEGG entry
- MetaCyc: metabolic pathway
- PRIAM: profile
- PDB structures: RCSB PDB PDBe PDBsum
- Gene Ontology: AmiGO / QuickGO
Search
- PMC: articles
- PubMed: articles
- NCBI: proteins

The enzyme D-serine ammonia-lyase (EC 4.3.1.18), with systematic name D-serine ammonia-lyase (pyruvate-forming), catalyzes the chemical reaction

D-serine = pyruvate + NH_{3} (overall reaction)

(1a) D-serine = 2-aminoprop-2-enoate + H_{2}O
(1b) 2-aminoprop-2-enoate = 2-iminopropanoate (spontaneous)
(1c) 2-iminopropanoate + H_{2}O = pyruvate + NH_{3} (spontaneous

Other names in common use include D-hydroxyaminoacid dehydratase, D-serine dehydrase, D-hydroxy amino acid dehydratase, D-serine hydrolase, D-serine dehydratase (deaminating), D-serine deaminase, and D-serine hydro-lyase (deaminating). This enzyme participates in glycine, serine and threonine metabolism. It employs one cofactor, pyridoxal phosphate.
