= L-fuconate dehydratase =

Identifiers
- EC no.: 4.2.1.68
- CAS no.: 37292-84-5

Databases
- IntEnz: IntEnz view
- BRENDA: BRENDA entry
- ExPASy: NiceZyme view
- KEGG: KEGG entry
- MetaCyc: metabolic pathway
- PRIAM: profile
- PDB structures: RCSB PDB PDBe PDBsum
- Gene Ontology: AmiGO / QuickGO
Search
- PMC: articles
- PubMed: articles
- NCBI: proteins

The enzyme L-fuconate dehydratase (EC 4.2.1.68) catalyzes the chemical reaction

L-fuconate $\rightleftharpoons$ 2-dehydro-3-deoxy-L-fuconate + H_{2}O

This enzyme belongs to the family of lyases, specifically the hydro-lyases, which cleave carbon-oxygen bonds. The systematic name of this enzyme class is L-fuconate hydro-lyase (2-dehydro-3-deoxy-L-fuconate-forming). This enzyme is also called L-fuconate hydro-lyase.
