= 5alpha-hydroxysteroid dehydratase =

Class of enzymes

5α-hydroxysteroid dehydratase

Identifiers
- EC no.: 4.2.1.62
- CAS no.: 9075-27-8

Databases
- IntEnz: IntEnz view
- BRENDA: BRENDA entry
- ExPASy: NiceZyme view
- KEGG: KEGG entry
- MetaCyc: metabolic pathway
- PRIAM: profile
- PDB structures: RCSB PDB PDBe PDBsum
- Gene Ontology: AmiGO / QuickGO
Search
- PMC: articles
- PubMed: articles
- NCBI: proteins

The enzyme 5α-hydroxysteroid dehydratase (EC 4.2.1.62) catalyzes the chemical reaction

5α-ergosta-7,22-diene-3β,5-diol $\rightleftharpoons$ ergosterol + H_{2}O

This enzyme belongs to the family of lyases, specifically the hydro-lyases, which cleave carbon-oxygen bonds. The systematic name of this enzyme class is 5α-ergosta-7,22-diene-3β,5-diol 5,6-hydro-lyase (ergosterol-forming). This enzyme is also called 5α-ergosta-7,22-diene-3β,5-diol 5,6-hydro-lyase.
