= Germacradienol synthase =

Identifiers
- EC no.: 4.2.3.22
- CAS no.: 211049-88-6

Databases
- IntEnz: IntEnz view
- BRENDA: BRENDA entry
- ExPASy: NiceZyme view
- KEGG: KEGG entry
- MetaCyc: metabolic pathway
- PRIAM: profile
- PDB structures: RCSB PDB PDBe PDBsum
Search
- PMC: articles
- PubMed: articles
- NCBI: proteins

Germacradienol synthase (EC 4.2.3.22, germacradienol/germacrene-D synthase, 2-trans,6-trans-farnesyl-diphosphate diphosphate-lyase [(1E,4S,5E,7R)-germacra-1(10),5-dien-11-ol-forming]) is an enzyme with systematic name (2E,6E)-farnesyl-diphosphate diphosphate-lyase ((1E,4S,5E,7R)-germacra-1(10),5-dien-11-ol-forming). This enzyme catalyses the following chemical reaction

(2E,6E)-farnesyl diphosphate + H_{2}O $\rightleftharpoons$ (1E,4S,5E,7R)-germacra-1(10),5-dien-11-ol + diphosphate

This enzyme requires Mg^{2+} for activity.
