= Magnesium dechelatase =

Magnesium dechelatase is a lyase enzyme that removes magnesium from chlorophyll a in plants to form pheophytin a. Its gene is Stay-Green, which is linked to the green cotyledon trait studied by Gregor Mendel. Its putative structure was deduced in 2021, and it is predicted to be a homo-oligomer.
