= 2,3-dimethylmalate lyase =

Class of enzymes

Identifiers
- EC no.: 4.1.3.32
- CAS no.: 73562-28-4

Databases
- IntEnz: IntEnz view
- BRENDA: BRENDA entry
- ExPASy: NiceZyme view
- KEGG: KEGG entry
- MetaCyc: metabolic pathway
- PRIAM: profile
- PDB structures: RCSB PDB PDBe PDBsum
- Gene Ontology: AmiGO / QuickGO
Search
- PMC: articles
- PubMed: articles
- NCBI: proteins

The enzyme 2,3-dimethylmalate lyase (EC 4.1.3.32) catalyzes the chemical reaction

(2R,3S)-2,3-dimethylmalate $\rightleftharpoons$ propanoate + pyruvate

This enzyme belongs to the family of lyases, specifically the oxo-acid-lyases, which cleave carbon-carbon bonds. The systematic name of this enzyme class is (2R,3S)-2,3-dimethylmalate pyruvate-lyase (propanoate-forming). Other names in common use include 2,3-dimethylmalate pyruvate-lyase, and (2R,3S)-2,3-dimethylmalate pyruvate-lyase. This enzyme participates in c5-branched dibasic acid metabolism.
