= 16-alpha-hydroxyprogesterone dehydratase =

Class of enzymes

16α-hydroxyprogesterone dehydratase

Identifiers
- EC no.: 4.2.1.98

Databases
- IntEnz: IntEnz view
- BRENDA: BRENDA entry
- ExPASy: NiceZyme view
- KEGG: KEGG entry
- MetaCyc: metabolic pathway
- PRIAM: profile
- PDB structures: RCSB PDB PDBe PDBsum
- Gene Ontology: AmiGO / QuickGO
Search
- PMC: articles
- PubMed: articles
- NCBI: proteins

The enzyme 16α-hydroxyprogesterone dehydratase (EC 4.2.1.98) catalyzes the chemical reaction

16α-hydroxyprogesterone = 16,17-didehydroprogesterone + H_{2}O

This enzyme belongs to the family of lyases, specifically the hydro-lyases, which cleave carbon-oxygen bonds. The systematic name of this enzyme class is 16α-hydroxyprogesterone hydro-lyase (16,17-didehydroprogesterone-forming). Other names in common use include hydroxyprogesterone dehydroxylase, 16α-hydroxyprogesterone dehydroxylase, 16α-dehydroxylase, and 16α-hydroxyprogesterone hydro-lyase.
