= 2-methylcitrate dehydratase (2-methyl-trans-aconitate forming) =

Class of enzymes

Identifiers
- EC no.: 4.2.1.117

Databases
- IntEnz: IntEnz view
- BRENDA: BRENDA entry
- ExPASy: NiceZyme view
- KEGG: KEGG entry
- MetaCyc: metabolic pathway
- PRIAM: profile
- PDB structures: RCSB PDB PDBe PDBsum
Search
- PMC: articles
- PubMed: articles
- NCBI: proteins

2-methylcitrate dehydratase (2-methyl-trans-aconitate forming) (EC 4.2.1.117) is an enzyme with systematic name (2S,3S)-2-hydroxybutane-1,2,3-tricarboxylate hydro-lyase (2-methyl-trans-aconitate forming). This enzyme catalyses the following chemical reaction

(2S,3S)-2-methylcitrate $\rightleftharpoons$ 2-methyl-trans-aconitate + H_{2}O
