= Propioin synthase =

propioin synthase

Identifiers
- EC no.: 4.1.2.35
- CAS no.: 114189-86-5

Databases
- IntEnz: IntEnz view
- BRENDA: BRENDA entry
- ExPASy: NiceZyme view
- KEGG: KEGG entry
- MetaCyc: metabolic pathway
- PRIAM: profile
- PDB structures: RCSB PDB PDBe PDBsum
- Gene Ontology: AmiGO / QuickGO
Search
- PMC: articles
- PubMed: articles
- NCBI: proteins

The enzyme propioin synthase (EC 4.1.2.35) catalyzes the chemical reaction

4-hydroxy-3-hexanone $\rightleftharpoons$ 2 propanal

This enzyme belongs to the family of lyases, specifically the aldehyde-lyases, which cleave carbon-carbon bonds. The systematic name of this enzyme class is 4-hydroxy-3-hexanone propanal-lyase (propanal-forming). Other names in common use include 4-hydroxy-3-hexanone aldolase, and 4-hydroxy-3-hexanone propanal-lyase.
