= 5-dehydro-4-deoxyglucarate dehydratase =

InterPro Family

Identifiers
- EC no.: 4.2.1.41
- CAS no.: 37290-77-0

Databases
- IntEnz: IntEnz view
- BRENDA: BRENDA entry
- ExPASy: NiceZyme view
- KEGG: KEGG entry
- MetaCyc: metabolic pathway
- PRIAM: profile
- PDB structures: RCSB PDB PDBe PDBsum
- Gene Ontology: AmiGO / QuickGO
Search
- PMC: articles
- PubMed: articles
- NCBI: proteins

The enzyme 5-dehydro-4-deoxyglucarate dehydratase (EC 4.2.1.41) catalyzes the chemical reaction

5-dehydro-4-deoxy-D-glucarate $\rightleftharpoons$ 2,5-dioxopentanoate + H_{2}O + CO_{2}

== Enzyme class ==
This enzyme belongs to the family of lyases, specifically the hydro-lyases, which cleave carbon-oxygen bonds. The systematic name of this enzyme class is 5-dehydro-4-deoxy-D-glucarate hydro-lyase (decarboxylating 2,5-dioxopentanoate-forming). Other names in common use include 5-keto-4-deoxy-glucarate dehydratase, deoxyketoglucarate dehydratase, D-4-deoxy-5-ketoglucarate hydro-lyase, and 5-dehydro-4-deoxy-D-glucarate hydro-lyase (decarboxylating). This enzyme participates in ascorbate and aldarate metabolism.
