= Galactonate dehydratase =

galactonate dehydratase

Identifiers
- EC no.: 4.2.1.6
- CAS no.: 9024-38-8

Databases
- IntEnz: IntEnz view
- BRENDA: BRENDA entry
- ExPASy: NiceZyme view
- KEGG: KEGG entry
- MetaCyc: metabolic pathway
- PRIAM: profile
- PDB structures: RCSB PDB PDBe PDBsum
- Gene Ontology: AmiGO / QuickGO
Search
- PMC: articles
- PubMed: articles
- NCBI: proteins

The enzyme galactonate dehydratase (EC 4.2.1.6) catalyzes the chemical reaction

D-galactonate $\rightleftharpoons$ 2-dehydro-3-deoxy-D-galactonate + H_{2}O

This enzyme belongs to the family of lyases, specifically the hydro-lyases, which cleave carbon-oxygen bonds. The systematic name of this enzyme class is D-galactonate hydro-lyase (2-dehydro-3-deoxy-D-alactonate-forming). Other names in common use include D-galactonate dehydrase, D-galactonate dehydratase, and D-galactonate hydro-lyase. This enzyme participates in galactose metabolism.
