= Synephrine dehydratase =

synephrine dehydratase

Identifiers
- EC no.: 4.2.1.88
- CAS no.: 104118-54-9

Databases
- IntEnz: IntEnz view
- BRENDA: BRENDA entry
- ExPASy: NiceZyme view
- KEGG: KEGG entry
- MetaCyc: metabolic pathway
- PRIAM: profile
- PDB structures: RCSB PDB PDBe PDBsum
- Gene Ontology: AmiGO / QuickGO
Search
- PMC: articles
- PubMed: articles
- NCBI: proteins

The enzyme synephrine dehydratase (EC 4.2.1.88) catalyzes the chemical reaction

(R)-synephrine $\rightleftharpoons$ (4-hydroxyphenyl)acetaldehyde + methylamine

This enzyme belongs to the family of lyases, specifically the hydro-lyases, which cleave carbon-oxygen bonds. The systematic name of this enzyme class is (R)-synephrine hydro-lyase (methylamine-forming).
