= 3-hydroxy-3-isohexenylglutaryl-CoA lyase =

Class of enzymes

Identifiers
- EC no.: 4.1.3.26
- CAS no.: 37290-69-0

Databases
- IntEnz: IntEnz view
- BRENDA: BRENDA entry
- ExPASy: NiceZyme view
- KEGG: KEGG entry
- MetaCyc: metabolic pathway
- PRIAM: profile
- PDB structures: RCSB PDB PDBe PDBsum
- Gene Ontology: AmiGO / QuickGO
Search
- PMC: articles
- PubMed: articles
- NCBI: proteins

The enzyme 3-hydroxy-3-isohexenylglutaryl-CoA lyase (EC 4.1.3.26) catalyzes the chemical reaction

3-hydroxy-3-(4-methylpent-3-en-1-yl)glutaryl-CoA $\rightleftharpoons$ 7-methyl-3-oxooct-6-enoyl-CoA + acetate

This enzyme belongs to the family of lyases, specifically the oxo-acid-lyases, which cleave carbon-carbon bonds. The systematic name of this enzyme class is 3-hydroxy-3-(4-methylpent-3-en-1-yl)glutaryl-CoA acetate-lyase (7-methyl-3-oxooct-6-enoyl-CoA-forming). Other names in common use include beta-hydroxy-beta-isohexenylglutaryl CoA-lyase, hydroxyisohexenylglutaryl-CoA:acetatelyase, 3-hydroxy-3-isohexenylglutaryl coenzyme A lyase, 3-hydroxy-3-isohexenylglutaryl-CoA isopentenylacetoacetyl-CoA-lyase, and 3-hydroxy-3-(4-methylpent-3-en-1-yl)glutaryl-CoA acetate-lyase.
