= Tryptophan synthase (indole-salvaging) =

Identifiers
- EC no.: 4.2.1.122

Databases
- IntEnz: IntEnz view
- BRENDA: BRENDA entry
- ExPASy: NiceZyme view
- KEGG: KEGG entry
- MetaCyc: metabolic pathway
- PRIAM: profile
- PDB structures: RCSB PDB PDBe PDBsum
Search
- PMC: articles
- PubMed: articles
- NCBI: proteins

Tryptophan synthase (indole-salvaging) (EC 4.2.1.122, tryptophan synthase beta2) is an enzyme with systematic name L-serine hydro-lyase (adding indole, L-tryptophan-forming). This enzyme catalyses the following chemical reaction

L-serine + indole $\rightleftharpoons$ L-tryptophan + H_{2}O

This enzyme salvages the lost indole to L-tryptophan.
