= L-arabinonate dehydratase =

Identifiers
- EC no.: 4.2.1.25
- CAS no.: 9024-30-0

Databases
- IntEnz: IntEnz view
- BRENDA: BRENDA entry
- ExPASy: NiceZyme view
- KEGG: KEGG entry
- MetaCyc: metabolic pathway
- PRIAM: profile
- PDB structures: RCSB PDB PDBe PDBsum
- Gene Ontology: AmiGO / QuickGO
Search
- PMC: articles
- PubMed: articles
- NCBI: proteins

The enzyme L-arabinonate dehydratase (EC 4.2.1.25) catalyzes the chemical reaction

L-arabinonate $\rightleftharpoons$ 2-dehydro-3-deoxy-L-arabinonate + H_{2}O

This enzyme belongs to the family of lyases, specifically the hydro-lyases, which cleave carbon-oxygen bonds. The systematic name of this enzyme class is L-arabinonate hydro-lyase (2-dehydro-3-deoxy-L-arabinonate-forming). Other names in common use include L-arabonate dehydrase, L-arabonate dehydratase, and L-arabinonate hydro-lyase. This enzyme participates in ascorbate and aldarate metabolism.
