= Galactarate dehydratase =

galactarate dehydratase

Identifiers
- EC no.: 4.2.1.42
- CAS no.: 37290-78-1

Databases
- IntEnz: IntEnz view
- BRENDA: BRENDA entry
- ExPASy: NiceZyme view
- KEGG: KEGG entry
- MetaCyc: metabolic pathway
- PRIAM: profile
- PDB structures: RCSB PDB PDBe PDBsum
- Gene Ontology: AmiGO / QuickGO
Search
- PMC: articles
- PubMed: articles
- NCBI: proteins

The enzyme galactarate dehydratase (EC 4.2.1.42) catalyzes the chemical reaction

D-galactarate $\rightleftharpoons$ 5-dehydro-4-deoxy-D-glucarate + H_{2}O

This enzyme belongs to the family of lyases, specifically the hydro-lyases, which cleave carbon-oxygen bonds. The systematic name of this enzyme class is D-galactarate hydro-lyase (5-dehydro-4-deoxy-D-glucarate-forming). This enzyme is also called D-galactarate hydro-lyase. This enzyme participates in ascorbate and aldarate metabolism.
