= 3-hydroxyaspartate aldolase =

Class of enzymes

L-erythro-3-hydroxyaspartate aldolase

Identifiers
- EC no.: 4.1.3.14
- CAS no.: 37290-64-5

Databases
- IntEnz: IntEnz view
- BRENDA: BRENDA entry
- ExPASy: NiceZyme view
- KEGG: KEGG entry
- MetaCyc: metabolic pathway
- PRIAM: profile
- PDB structures: RCSB PDB PDBe PDBsum
- Gene Ontology: AmiGO / QuickGO
Search
- PMC: articles
- PubMed: articles
- NCBI: proteins

The enzyme L-erythro-3-hydroxyaspartate aldolase (EC 4.1.3.14) catalyzes the chemical reaction

L-erythro-3-hydroxy-aspartate $\rightleftharpoons$ glycine + glyoxylate

This enzyme belongs to the family of lyases, specifically the oxo-acid-lyases, which cleave carbon-carbon bonds. The systematic name of this enzyme class is L-erythro-3-hydroxy-aspartate glyoxylate-lyase (glycine-forming). Other names in common use include erythro-beta-hydroxyaspartate aldolase, erythro-beta-hydroxyaspartate glycine-lyase, and erythro-3-hydroxy-Ls-aspartate glyoxylate-lyase.
