= Itaconyl-CoA hydratase =

itaconyl-CoA hydratase

Identifiers
- EC no.: 4.2.1.56
- CAS no.: 37290-83-8

Databases
- IntEnz: IntEnz view
- BRENDA: BRENDA entry
- ExPASy: NiceZyme view
- KEGG: KEGG entry
- MetaCyc: metabolic pathway
- PRIAM: profile
- PDB structures: RCSB PDB PDBe PDBsum
- Gene Ontology: AmiGO / QuickGO
Search
- PMC: articles
- PubMed: articles
- NCBI: proteins

The enzyme itaconyl-CoA hydratase (EC 4.2.1.56) catalyzes the chemical reaction

citramalyl-CoA $\rightleftharpoons$ itaconyl-CoA + H_{2}O

This enzyme belongs to the family of lyases, specifically the hydro-lyases, which cleave carbon-oxygen bonds. The systematic name of this enzyme class is citramalyl-CoA hydro-lyase (itaconyl-CoA-forming). Other names in common use include itaconyl coenzyme A hydratase, and citramalyl-CoA hydro-lyase. This enzyme participates in c5-branched dibasic acid metabolism.
