= Casbene synthase =

Enzyme

casbene synthase

Identifiers
- EC no.: 4.2.3.8
- CAS no.: 69106-45-2

Databases
- IntEnz: IntEnz view
- BRENDA: BRENDA entry
- ExPASy: NiceZyme view
- KEGG: KEGG entry
- MetaCyc: metabolic pathway
- PRIAM: profile
- PDB structures: RCSB PDB PDBe PDBsum
- Gene Ontology: AmiGO / QuickGO
Search
- PMC: articles
- PubMed: articles
- NCBI: proteins

The enzyme casbene synthase (EC 4.2.3.8) catalyzes the chemical reaction

geranylgeranyl diphosphate $\rightleftharpoons$ casbene + diphosphate

This enzyme belongs to the family of lyases, specifically those carbon-oxygen lyases acting on phosphates. The systematic name of this enzyme class is geranylgeranyl-diphosphate diphosphate-lyase (cyclizing, casbene-forming). Other names in common use include casbene synthetase, and geranylgeranyl-diphosphate diphosphate-lyase (cyclizing). This enzyme participates in diterpenoid biosynthesis.
