= Glucarate dehydratase =

glucarate dehydratase
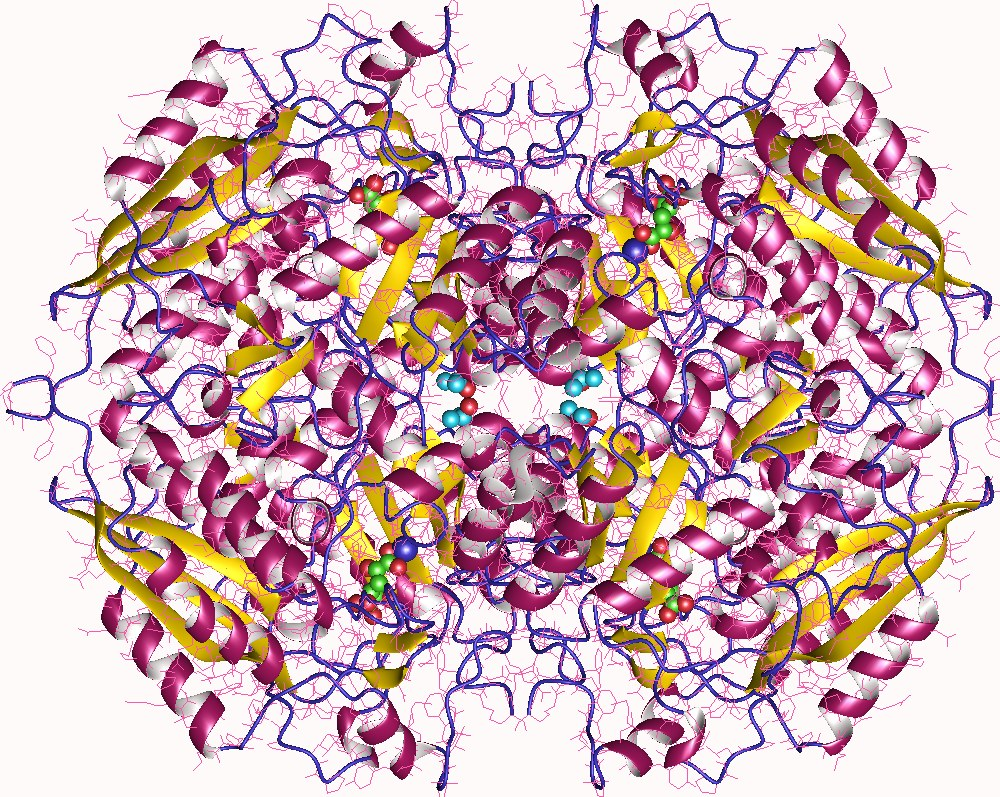
- glucarate dehydratase tetramer, E.Coli

Identifiers
- EC no.: 4.2.1.40
- CAS no.: 9059-02-3

Databases
- IntEnz: IntEnz view
- BRENDA: BRENDA entry
- ExPASy: NiceZyme view
- KEGG: KEGG entry
- MetaCyc: metabolic pathway
- PRIAM: profile
- PDB structures: RCSB PDB PDBe PDBsum
- Gene Ontology: AmiGO / QuickGO
Search
- PMC: articles
- PubMed: articles
- NCBI: proteins

The enzyme glucarate dehydratase (EC 4.2.1.40) catalyzes the chemical reaction

D-glucarate $\rightleftharpoons$ 5-dehydro-4-deoxy-D-glucarate + H_{2}O

This enzyme belongs to the family of lyases, specifically the hydro-lyases, which cleave carbon-oxygen bonds. The systematic name of this enzyme class is D-glucarate hydro-lyase (5-dehydro-4-deoxy-D-glucarate-forming). Other names in common use include D-glucarate dehydratase, and D-glucarate hydro-lyase. This enzyme participates in ascorbate and aldarate metabolism.

== Structural studies ==
As of late 2007, 7 structures have been solved for this class of enzymes, with PDB accession codes 1BQG, 1EC7, 1EC8, 1EC9, 1ECQ, 1JCT, and 1JDF.
