= Cytidylate cyclase =

cytidylate cyclase

Identifiers
- EC no.: 4.6.1.6
- CAS no.: 65357-82-6

Databases
- IntEnz: IntEnz view
- BRENDA: BRENDA entry
- ExPASy: NiceZyme view
- KEGG: KEGG entry
- MetaCyc: metabolic pathway
- PRIAM: profile
- PDB structures: RCSB PDB PDBe PDBsum
- Gene Ontology: AmiGO / QuickGO
Search
- PMC: articles
- PubMed: articles
- NCBI: proteins

The enzyme cytidylate cyclase (EC 4.6.1.6) is an enzyme that catalyzes the reaction

CTP = 3′,5′-cyclic CMP + diphosphate

This enzyme belongs to the family of lyases, specifically the class of phosphorus-oxygen lyases. The systematic name of this enzyme class is CTP diphosphate-lyase (cyclizing; 3′,5′-cyclic-CMP-forming). Other names in common use include 3',5'-cyclic-CMP synthase, cytidylyl cyclase, cytidyl cyclase, and CTP diphosphate-lyase (cyclizing).
