= Trans-o-hydroxybenzylidenepyruvate hydratase-aldolase =

trans-o-Hydroxybenzylidenepyruvate hydratase-aldolase

Identifiers
- EC no.: 4.1.2.45

Databases
- IntEnz: IntEnz view
- BRENDA: BRENDA entry
- ExPASy: NiceZyme view
- KEGG: KEGG entry
- MetaCyc: metabolic pathway
- PRIAM: profile
- PDB structures: RCSB PDB PDBe PDBsum
Search
- PMC: articles
- PubMed: articles
- NCBI: proteins

trans-o-Hydroxybenzylidenepyruvate hydratase-aldolase (EC 4.1.2.45, 2′-hydroxybenzalpyruvate aldolase, NsaE, tHBPA hydratase-aldolase) is an enzyme with systematic name (3E)-4-(2-hydroxyphenyl)-2-oxobut-3-enoate hydro-lyase. This enzyme catalyses the following chemical reaction

(3E)-4-(2-hydroxyphenyl)-2-oxobut-3-enoate + H_{2}O $\rightleftharpoons$ salicylaldehyde + pyruvate

This enzyme is involved in naphthalene degradation.
