= Arabinonate dehydratase =

Enzyme

arabinonate dehydratase

Identifiers
- EC no.: 4.2.1.5
- CAS no.: 9024-36-6

Databases
- BRENDA: enzyme data
- ExPASy: NiceZyme view
- KEGG: enzyme entry
- MetaCyc: metabolic pathway
- Rhea: reactions
- PDB structures: RCSB PDB PDBe PDBsum
- Gene Ontology: AmiGO / QuickGO
Search
- PMC: articles
- PubMed: articles
- NCBI: proteins

The enzyme arabinonate dehydratase (EC 4.2.1.5) catalyzes the chemical reaction

D-arabinonate $\rightleftharpoons$ 2-dehydro-3-deoxy-D-arabinonate + H_{2}O

This enzyme belongs to the family of lyases, specifically the hydro-lyases, which cleave carbon-oxygen bonds. The systematic name of this enzyme class is D-arabinonate hydro-lyase (2-dehydro-3-deoxy-D-arabinonate-forming). This enzyme is also called D-arabinonate hydro-lyase.
