= 3-hydroxy-D-aspartate aldolase =

Class of enzymes

Identifiers
- EC no.: 4.1.3.41

Databases
- IntEnz: IntEnz view
- BRENDA: BRENDA entry
- ExPASy: NiceZyme view
- KEGG: KEGG entry
- MetaCyc: metabolic pathway
- PRIAM: profile
- PDB structures: RCSB PDB PDBe PDBsum
Search
- PMC: articles
- PubMed: articles
- NCBI: proteins

3-hydroxy-D-aspartate aldolase (EC 4.1.3.41, D-3-hydroxyaspartate aldolase) is an enzyme with systematic name 3-hydroxy-D-aspartate glyoxylate-lyase (glycine-forming). This enzyme catalyses the following chemical reaction

(1) threo-3-hydroxy-D-aspartate $\rightleftharpoons$ glycine + glyoxylate
(2) D-erythro-3-hydroxyaspartate $\rightleftharpoons$ glycine + glyoxylate

This enzyme is a pyridoxal-phosphate protein.
