= 5-oxopent-3-ene-1,2,5-tricarboxylate decarboxylase =

Enzyme

Identifiers
- EC no.: 4.1.1.68

Databases
- IntEnz: IntEnz view
- BRENDA: BRENDA entry
- ExPASy: NiceZyme view
- KEGG: KEGG entry
- MetaCyc: metabolic pathway
- PRIAM: profile
- PDB structures: RCSB PDB PDBe PDBsum
- Gene Ontology: AmiGO / QuickGO
Search
- PMC: articles
- PubMed: articles
- NCBI: proteins

The enzyme 5-oxopent-3-ene-1,2,5-tricarboxylate decarboxylase (EC 4.1.1.68) catalyzes the chemical reaction

5-oxopent-3-ene-1,2,5-tricarboxylate $\rightleftharpoons$ 2-oxohept-3-enedioate + CO_{2}

This enzyme belongs to the family of lyases, specifically the carboxy-lyases, which cleave carbon-carbon bonds. The systematic name of this enzyme class is 5-oxopent-3-ene-1,2,5-tricarboxylate carboxy-lyase (2-oxohept-3-enedioate-forming). Other names in common use include 5-carboxymethyl-2-oxo-hex-3-ene-1,6-dioate decarboxylase, and 5-oxopent-3-ene-1,2,5-tricarboxylate carboxy-lyase. This enzyme participates in tyrosine metabolism.

== Structural studies ==
As of late 2007, only one structure has been solved for this class of enzymes, with the PDB accession code 1I7O.
