= Ribonuclease U2 =

Identifiers
- EC no.: 3.1.27.4
- CAS no.: 37205-57-5

Databases
- IntEnz: IntEnz view
- BRENDA: BRENDA entry
- ExPASy: NiceZyme view
- KEGG: KEGG entry
- MetaCyc: metabolic pathway
- PRIAM: profile
- PDB structures: RCSB PDB PDBe PDBsum
Search
- PMC: articles
- PubMed: articles
- NCBI: proteins

Ribonuclease U2 (EC 3.1.27.4, purine specific endoribonuclease, ribonuclease U3, RNase U3, RNase U2, purine-specific ribonuclease, purine-specific RNase, Pleospora RNase, Trichoderma koningi RNase III, ribonuclease (purine)) is an enzyme. This enzyme catalyses the following chemical reaction

Two-stage endonucleolytic cleavage to nucleoside 3'-phosphates and 3'-phosphooligonucleotides ending in Ap or Gp with 2',3'-cyclic phosphate intermediates
