= 3-cyanoalanine hydratase =

Class of enzymes

Identifiers
- EC no.: 4.2.1.65
- CAS no.: 37259-64-6

Databases
- IntEnz: IntEnz view
- BRENDA: BRENDA entry
- ExPASy: NiceZyme view
- KEGG: KEGG entry
- MetaCyc: metabolic pathway
- PRIAM: profile
- PDB structures: RCSB PDB PDBe PDBsum
- Gene Ontology: AmiGO / QuickGO
Search
- PMC: articles
- PubMed: articles
- NCBI: proteins

The enzyme 3-cyanoalanine hydratase (EC 4.2.1.65) catalyzes the chemical reaction

L-asparagine $\rightleftharpoons$ 3-cyanoalanine + H_{2}O

This enzyme belongs to the family of lyases, specifically the hydro-lyases, which cleave carbon-oxygen bonds. The systematic name of this enzyme class is L-asparagine hydro-lyase (3-cyanoalanine-forming). Other names in common use include β-cyanoalanine hydrolase, β-cyanoalanine hydratase, β-CNAla hydrolase, β-CNA nitrilase, and L-asparagine hydro-lyase. This enzyme participates in cyanoamino acid metabolism.
