= 4-hydroxybutanoyl-CoA dehydratase =

Class of enzymes

Identifiers
- EC no.: 4.2.1.120

Databases
- IntEnz: IntEnz view
- BRENDA: BRENDA entry
- ExPASy: NiceZyme view
- KEGG: KEGG entry
- MetaCyc: metabolic pathway
- PRIAM: profile
- PDB structures: RCSB PDB PDBe PDBsum
Search
- PMC: articles
- PubMed: articles
- NCBI: proteins

4-hydroxybutanoyl-CoA dehydratase (EC 4.2.1.120) is an enzyme with systematic name 4-hydroxybutanoyl-CoA hydro-lyase. This enzyme catalyses the following chemical reaction

4-hydroxybutanoyl-CoA $\rightleftharpoons$ (E)-but-3-enoyl-CoA + H_{2}O

This enzyme contains FAD and a [4Fe-4S] iron-sulfur cluster.
