= Trans-L-3-hydroxyproline dehydratase =

trans-L-3-hydroxyproline dehydratase

Identifiers
- EC no.: 4.2.1.77

Databases
- IntEnz: IntEnz view
- BRENDA: BRENDA entry
- ExPASy: NiceZyme view
- KEGG: KEGG entry
- MetaCyc: metabolic pathway
- PRIAM: profile
- PDB structures: RCSB PDB PDBe PDBsum
- Gene Ontology: AmiGO / QuickGO
Search
- PMC: articles
- PubMed: articles
- NCBI: proteins

The enzyme trans-L-3-hydroxyproline dehydratase (EC 4.2.1.77) catalyzes the chemical reaction

trans-L-3-hydroxyproline $\rightleftharpoons$ Δ_{1}-pyrroline 2-carboxylate + H_{2}O

This enzyme belongs to the family of lyases, specifically the hydro-lyases, which cleave carbon-oxygen bonds. The systematic name of this enzyme class is trans-L-3-hydroxyproline hydro-lyase (Δ_{1}-pyrroline-2-carboxylate-forming). This enzyme is also called trans-L-3-hydroxyproline hydro-lyase.
