= Oleate hydratase =

oleate hydratase

Identifiers
- EC no.: 4.2.1.53
- CAS no.: 9073-51-2

Databases
- IntEnz: IntEnz view
- BRENDA: BRENDA entry
- ExPASy: NiceZyme view
- KEGG: KEGG entry
- MetaCyc: metabolic pathway
- PRIAM: profile
- PDB structures: RCSB PDB PDBe PDBsum
- Gene Ontology: AmiGO / QuickGO
Search
- PMC: articles
- PubMed: articles
- NCBI: proteins

Oleate hydratase (EC 4.2.1.53) is an enzyme that catalyzes the conversion of oleic acid, a common monounsaturated fatty acid, into (R)-10-hydroxystearic acid. This reaction is a type of hydration, where a water molecule is added across the carbon-carbon double bond of oleic acid. Oleate hydratase is primarily found in bacteria and plays a role in microbial fatty acid metabolism. This enzyme has attracted industrial interest because its product is used in the production of bioplastics, lubricants, surfactants, and other bio-based applications.

== History and discovery ==
The conversion of oleic acid into 10-hydroxystearic acid was first observed in 1962 in a bacterial strain later identified as Elizabethkingia meningoseptica. Scientists noticed that the product accumulated outside the cells, suggesting a specific enzyme was responsible. This enzyme was later named oleate hydratase. Early studies confirmed that the enzyme works by adding a water molecule to the double bond of oleic acid. In 2009, researchers isolated the enzyme for the first time, and in 2015, its crystal structure was solved. These studies confirmed the presence of FAD in the enzyme and helped explain how it carries out the hydration reaction with high specificity. This discovery marked the beginning of using oleate hydratase in biotechnology and industrial research.

== Reaction and classification ==
Oleate hydratase catalyzes a reversible reaction where oleic is converted into (R)-10-hydroxystearic acid by adding a water molecule. The chemical reaction can be written as:

(R)-10-hydroxystearate $\rightleftharpoons$ oleate + H_{2}O

This enzyme belongs to the family of lyases, specifically the hydro-lyases, which are enzymes that break or form carbon-oxygen bonds. Its EC number is 4.2.1.53, and each part of this number describes its function:

- “4” indicates it is a lyase (enzymes that break bonds down without using water or oxidation).
- “2” specifies that it acts on carbon-oxygen bonds.
- “1” shows it is a hydro-lyase, which adds or removes water.
- “53” is the unique number assigned to oleate hydratase.

== Organisms ==
Oleate hydratase is primarily produced by various bacterial species that metabolize fatty acids as part of their energy and survival processes. This enzyme has been found in several bacteria, especially those that live in environments rich in fatty acids such as soil and the human gut. These include species such as Elizabethkingia meningoseptica and Staphylococcus aureus. Many microbes use the enzyme as part of fatty acid metabolism or for producing hydroxylated fatty acids. These products can help bacteria survive in different environments or interact with host organisms.

== Function ==
In microbes, oleate hydratase connects fatty acid metabolism to other cellular pathways. By adding a hydroxyl group to fatty acids, it produces new molecules that can be used as:

- Precursors for polymers or bioactive compounds.
- Modified energy storage molecules that have different properties (such as solubility) compared to regular fatty acids.

These products can help bacteria survive environmental stress and adapt to different growth conditions.

== Crystal structure ==
The crystal structure of oleate hydratase has been studied in several bacterial species. These studies show that the enzyme often functions as a dimer, meaning it is made of two identical subunits that work together. The enzyme contains a hydrophobic pocket that helps the fatty acid substrate fit into the active site in the correct position. In many species, a flavin adenine dinucleotide (FAD) molecule is also found inside the structure. FAD is not always required for the reaction, it helps stabilize the overall structure of the enzyme and supports proper substrate binding.

== Active site ==
The active site contains hydrophobic regions that hold the fatty acid chain in place and align the double bond for the hydration reaction. Key amino acids, such as histidine or tyrosine (depending on the bacterial species), help activate the water molecule. The enzyme is also stereospecific, meaning it only produces the (R)-10-hydroxystearic acid form. The stereospecific nature of the active site is one of the key reasons why this enzyme is valuable for industrial and biochemical applications.

== Industrial applications ==
Oleate hydratase is important in biotechnology because it produces (R)-10-hydroxystearic acid, a useful compound made from natural fatty acids. This product is used in making eco-friendly materials such as bioplastics, bio-based lubricants, surfactants, and cosmetic ingredients. One thing about this enzyme is that it works under gentle conditions and does not require harsh chemicals, making it a cleaner and more sustainable option compared to traditional chemical methods.
