= Citramalate lyase =

citramalate lyase

Identifiers
- EC no.: 4.1.3.22
- CAS no.: 9027-93-4

Databases
- IntEnz: IntEnz view
- BRENDA: BRENDA entry
- ExPASy: NiceZyme view
- KEGG: KEGG entry
- MetaCyc: metabolic pathway
- PRIAM: profile
- PDB structures: RCSB PDB PDBe PDBsum
- Gene Ontology: AmiGO / QuickGO
Search
- PMC: articles
- PubMed: articles
- NCBI: proteins

The enzyme citramalate lyase (EC 4.1.3.22) catalyzes the chemical reaction

(2S)-2-hydroxy-2-methylbutanedioate $\rightleftharpoons$ acetate + pyruvate

This enzyme belongs to the family of lyases, specifically the oxo-acid-lyases, which cleave carbon-carbon bonds. The systematic name of this enzyme class is (2S)-2-hydroxy-2-methylbutanedioate pyruvate-lyase (acetate-forming). Other names in common use include citramalate pyruvate-lyase, citramalate synthase, citramalic-condensing enzyme, citramalate synthetase, citramalic synthase, (S)-citramalate lyase, (+)-citramalate pyruvate-lyase, citramalate pyruvate lyase, (3S)-citramalate pyruvate-lyase, and (2S)-2-hydroxy-2-methylbutanedioate pyruvate-lyase. This enzyme participates in c5-branched dibasic acid metabolism.
