= 3-hydroxydecanoyl-(acyl-carrier-protein) dehydratase =

Class of enzymes

Identifiers
- EC no.: 4.2.1.60
- CAS no.: 9030-79-9

Databases
- BRENDA: enzyme data
- ExPASy: NiceZyme view
- KEGG: enzyme entry
- MetaCyc: metabolic pathway
- Rhea: reactions
- PDB structures: RCSB PDB PDBe PDBsum
Search
- PMC: articles
- PubMed: articles
- NCBI: proteins

3-hydroxydecanoyl-(acyl-carrier-protein) dehydratase (EC 4.2.1.60, D-3-hydroxydecanoyl-[acyl-carrier protein] dehydratase, 3-hydroxydecanoyl-acyl carrier protein dehydrase, 3-hydroxydecanoyl-acyl carrier protein dehydratase, β-hydroxydecanoyl thioester dehydrase, β-hydroxydecanoate dehydrase, beta-hydroxydecanoyl thiol ester dehydrase, FabA, β-hydroxyacyl-acyl carrier protein dehydratase, HDDase, β-hydroxyacyl-ACP dehydrase, (3R)-3-hydroxydecanoyl-[acyl-carrier-protein] hydro-lyase) is an enzyme with systematic name (3R)-3-hydroxydecanoyl-(acyl-carrier protein) hydro-lyase. This enzyme catalyses the following chemical reaction

(1) a (3R)-3-hydroxydecanoyl-[acyl-carrier protein] $\rightleftharpoons$ a trans-dec-2-enoyl-[acyl-carrier protein] + H_{2}O
(2) a (3R)-3-hydroxydecanoyl-[acyl-carrier protein] $\rightleftharpoons$ a cis-dec-3-enoyl-[acyl-carrier protein] + H_{2}O

This enzyme is specific for C10 chain length.
