= (S)-2-methylmalate dehydratase =

Class of enzymes

Identifiers
- EC no.: 4.2.1.34
- CAS no.: 9027-94-5

Databases
- IntEnz: IntEnz view
- BRENDA: BRENDA entry
- ExPASy: NiceZyme view
- KEGG: KEGG entry
- MetaCyc: metabolic pathway
- PRIAM: profile
- PDB structures: RCSB PDB PDBe PDBsum
- Gene Ontology: AmiGO / QuickGO
Search
- PMC: articles
- PubMed: articles
- NCBI: proteins

The enzyme (S)-2-methylmalate dehydratase (EC 4.2.1.34) catalyzes the chemical reaction:

(S)-2-methylmalate $\rightleftharpoons$ 2-methylfumarate + H_{2}O

This enzyme belongs to the family of lyases, specifically the hydro-lyases, which cleave carbon-oxygen bonds. The systematic name of this enzyme class is (S)-2-methylmalate hydro-lyase (2-methylfumarate-forming). Other names in common use include mesaconate hydratase, (+)-citramalate hydro-lyase, L-citramalate hydrolase, citramalate dehydratase, (+)-citramalic hydro-lyase, mesaconate mesaconase, mesaconase, and (S)-2-methylmalate hydro-lyase.

This enzyme participates in c5-branched dibasic acid metabolism. In addition, the family of lyases which is also an enzyme catalyzes the breaking the elimination reaction of the variety of amounts of chemical bonds from hydrolysis (a substitution reaction ) and oxidation, which forms a new double bond or a new ring structure.
