= 3-dehydroshikimate dehydratase =

Class of enzymes

Identifiers
- EC no.: 4.2.1.118

Databases
- IntEnz: IntEnz view
- BRENDA: BRENDA entry
- ExPASy: NiceZyme view
- KEGG: KEGG entry
- MetaCyc: metabolic pathway
- PRIAM: profile
- PDB structures: RCSB PDB PDBe PDBsum
Search
- PMC: articles
- PubMed: articles
- NCBI: proteins

3-dehydroshikimate dehydratase (EC 4.2.1.118) is an enzyme with systematic name 3-dehydroshikimate hydro-lyase. This enzyme catalyses the following chemical reaction

3-dehydro-shikimate $\rightleftharpoons$ 3,4-dihydroxybenzoate + H_{2}O

This enzyme catalyses an early step in the biosynthesis of petrobactin.
