= 2-iminoacetate synthase =

Class of enzymes

Identifiers
- EC no.: 4.1.99.19

Databases
- IntEnz: IntEnz view
- BRENDA: BRENDA entry
- ExPASy: NiceZyme view
- KEGG: KEGG entry
- MetaCyc: metabolic pathway
- PRIAM: profile
- PDB structures: RCSB PDB PDBe PDBsum
Search
- PMC: articles
- PubMed: articles
- NCBI: proteins

2-iminoacetate synthase (EC 4.1.99.19, thiH (gene)) is an enzyme with systematic name L-tyrosine 4-methylphenol-lyase (2-iminoacetate-forming). This enzyme catalyses the following chemical reaction

L-tyrosine + S-adenosyl-L-methionine + reduced acceptor $\rightleftharpoons$ 2-iminoacetate + 4-methylphenol + 5'-deoxyadenosine + L-methionine + acceptor + 2 H^{+}

This enzyme binds a 4Fe-4S cluster.
