= Copal-8-ol diphosphate hydratase =

Enzyme

Identifiers
- EC no.: 4.2.1.133

Databases
- IntEnz: IntEnz view
- BRENDA: BRENDA entry
- ExPASy: NiceZyme view
- KEGG: KEGG entry
- MetaCyc: metabolic pathway
- PRIAM: profile
- PDB structures: RCSB PDB PDBe PDBsum
Search
- PMC: articles
- PubMed: articles
- NCBI: proteins

Copal-8-ol diphosphate hydratase (EC 4.2.1.133, CcCLS) is an enzyme with systematic name geranylgeranyl-diphosphate hydro-lyase ((13E)-8α-hydroxylabda-13-en-15-yl diphosphate forming). This enzyme catalyses the following chemical reaction

(13E)-8α-hydroxylabda-13-en-15-yl diphosphate $\rightleftharpoons$ geranylgeranyl diphosphate + H_{2}O

This enzyme requires Mg^{2+}.
