= Gellan lyase =

Class of enzymes

Identifiers
- EC no.: 4.2.2.25

Databases
- IntEnz: IntEnz view
- BRENDA: BRENDA entry
- ExPASy: NiceZyme view
- KEGG: KEGG entry
- MetaCyc: metabolic pathway
- PRIAM: profile
- PDB structures: RCSB PDB PDBe PDBsum
Search
- PMC: articles
- PubMed: articles
- NCBI: proteins

Gellan lyase (EC 4.2.2.25) is an enzyme with systematic name gellan β-D-glucopyranosyl-(1→4)-D-glucopyranosyluronate lyase. This enzyme catalyses the following process:

Eliminative cleavage of β-D-glucopyranosyl-(1→4)-β-D-glucopyranosyluronate bonds of gellan backbone releasing tetrasaccharides containing a 4-deoxy-4,5-unsaturated D-glucopyranosyluronic acid at the non-reducing end. The tetrasaccharide produced from deacetylated gellan is β-D-4-deoxy-Δ^{4}-GlcAp-(1→4)-β-D-Glcp-(1→4)-α-L-Rhap-(1→3)-β-D-Glcp.
