= D-lactate dehydratase =

Enzyme

Identifiers
- EC no.: 4.2.1.130

Databases
- IntEnz: IntEnz view
- BRENDA: BRENDA entry
- ExPASy: NiceZyme view
- KEGG: KEGG entry
- MetaCyc: metabolic pathway
- PRIAM: profile
- PDB structures: RCSB PDB PDBe PDBsum
Search
- PMC: articles
- PubMed: articles
- NCBI: proteins

D-lactate dehydratase (EC 4.2.1.130, glyoxylase III) is an enzyme with systematic name (R)-lactate hydro-lyase. This enzyme catalyses the following chemical reaction

(R)-lactate $\rightleftharpoons$ methylglyoxal + H_{2}O

The enzyme converts methylglyoxal to (R)-lactate.
