= 7-carboxy-7-deazaguanine synthase =

Class of enzymes

Identifiers
- EC no.: 4.3.99.3

Databases
- IntEnz: IntEnz view
- BRENDA: BRENDA entry
- ExPASy: NiceZyme view
- KEGG: KEGG entry
- MetaCyc: metabolic pathway
- PRIAM: profile
- PDB structures: RCSB PDB PDBe PDBsum
Search
- PMC: articles
- PubMed: articles
- NCBI: proteins

7-Carboxy-7-deazaguanine synthase (EC 4.3.99.3, 7-carboxy-7-carbaguanine synthase, queE (gene)) is an enzyme with systematic name 6-carboxy-5,6,7,8-tetrahydropterin ammonia-lyase. This enzyme catalyses the following chemical reaction

6-carboxy-5,6,7,8-tetrahydropterin $\rightleftharpoons$ 7-carboxy-7-carbaguanine + NH_{3}

The enzyme is a member of the superfamily of S-adenosyl-L-methionine-dependent radical enzymes.
