= Cyclohexa-1,5-dienecarbonyl-CoA hydratase =

cyclohexa-1,5-dienecarbonyl-CoA hydratase

Identifiers
- EC no.: 4.2.1.100

Databases
- IntEnz: IntEnz view
- BRENDA: BRENDA entry
- ExPASy: NiceZyme view
- KEGG: KEGG entry
- MetaCyc: metabolic pathway
- PRIAM: profile
- PDB structures: RCSB PDB PDBe PDBsum
- Gene Ontology: AmiGO / QuickGO
Search
- PMC: articles
- PubMed: articles
- NCBI: proteins

The enzyme cyclohexa-1,5-dienecarbonyl-CoA hydratase (EC 4.2.1.100) catalyzes the chemical reaction

6-hydroxycyclohex-1-enecarbonyl-CoA $\rightleftharpoons$ cyclohexa-1,5-dienecarbonyl-CoA + H_{2}O

This enzyme belongs to the family of lyases, specifically the hydro-lyases, which cleave carbon-oxygen bonds. The systematic name of this enzyme class is 6-hydroxycyclohex-1-enecarbonyl-CoA (cyclohexa-1,5-dienecarbonyl-CoA-forming). Other names in common use include cyclohexa-1,5-diene-1-carbonyl-CoA hydratase, dienoyl-CoA hydratase, and cyclohexa-1,5-dienecarbonyl-CoA hydro-lyase (incorrect). This enzyme participates in benzoate degradation via CoA ligation.
