= Isopimara-7,15-diene synthase =

Identifiers
- EC no.: 4.2.3.44

Databases
- IntEnz: IntEnz view
- BRENDA: BRENDA entry
- ExPASy: NiceZyme view
- KEGG: KEGG entry
- MetaCyc: metabolic pathway
- PRIAM: profile
- PDB structures: RCSB PDB PDBe PDBsum
Search
- PMC: articles
- PubMed: articles
- NCBI: proteins

Isopimara-7,15-diene synthase (EC 4.2.3.44, PaTPS-Iso, copalyl diphosphate-lyase (isopimara-7,15-diene-forming)) is an enzyme with systematic name (+)-copalyl diphosphate-lyase (isopimara-7,15-diene-forming). This enzyme catalyses the following chemical reaction

(+)-copalyl diphosphate $\rightleftharpoons$ isopimara-7,15-diene + diphosphate

The enzyme only forms isopimara-7,15-diene.
