= Difructose-anhydride synthase =

Class of enzymes

difructose-anhydride synthase

Identifiers
- EC no.: 4.2.1.179
- CAS no.: 121479-55-8

Databases
- BRENDA: enzyme data
- ExPASy: NiceZyme view
- KEGG: enzyme entry
- MetaCyc: metabolic pathway
- Rhea: reactions
- PDB structures: RCSB PDB PDBe PDBsum
- Gene Ontology: AmiGO / QuickGO
Search
- PMC: articles
- PubMed: articles
- NCBI: proteins

In enzymology, a difructose-anhydride synthase (EC 4.2.1.179) is an enzyme that catalyzes the chemical reaction

bis-D-fructose 2',1:2,1'-dianhydride + H_{2}O $\rightleftharpoons$ inulobiose

Thus, the two substrates of this enzyme are bis-D-fructose 2',1:2,1'-dianhydride and H_{2}O, whereas its product is inulobiose.

This enzyme belongs to the family of hydrolases, specifically those glycosidases that hydrolyse O- and S-glycosyl compounds. The systematic name of this enzyme class is bis-D-fructose 2',1:2,1'-dianhydride fructohydrolase. This enzyme is also called inulobiose hydrolase.
