= Fusicocca-2,10(14)-diene synthase =

Identifiers
- EC no.: 4.2.3.43

Databases
- BRENDA: enzyme data
- ExPASy: NiceZyme view
- KEGG: enzyme entry
- MetaCyc: metabolic pathway
- Rhea: reactions
- PDB structures: RCSB PDB PDBe PDBsum
Search
- PMC: articles
- PubMed: articles
- NCBI: proteins

Fusicocca-2,10(14)-diene synthase (EC 4.2.3.43, fusicoccadiene synthase, PaFS, PaDC4) is an enzyme with systematic name geranylgeranyl diphosphate-lyase (fusicocca-2,10(14)-diene-forming). This enzyme catalyses the following chemical reaction

geranylgeranyl diphosphate $\rightleftharpoons$ fusicocca-2,10(14)-diene + diphosphate

This multifunctional enzyme also has EC 2.5.1.29, farnesyltranstransferase, activity. In 2016, the crystal structures of individual prenyltransferase and cyclase domains were reported by the research group of David W. Christianson at the University of Pennsylvania. The structure of the intact, full-length enzyme was studied using negative-stain electron microscopy and cryo-electron microscopy, showing that a central prenyltransferase octamer was surrounded by eight randomly splayed-out cyclase domains capable of transient association with the prenyltransferase.
