= Chondroitin AC lyase =

Enzyme

chondroitin AC lyase

Identifiers
- EC no.: 4.2.2.5
- CAS no.: 9047-57-8

Databases
- IntEnz: IntEnz view
- BRENDA: BRENDA entry
- ExPASy: NiceZyme view
- KEGG: KEGG entry
- MetaCyc: metabolic pathway
- PRIAM: profile
- PDB structures: RCSB PDB PDBe PDBsum
- Gene Ontology: AmiGO / QuickGO
Search
- PMC: articles
- PubMed: articles
- NCBI: proteins

The enzyme chondroitin AC lyase (EC 4.2.2.5) catalyzes the chemical reaction

Eliminative degradation of polysaccharides containing 1,4-β-D-hexosaminyl and 1,3-β-D-glucuronosyl linkages to disaccharides containing 4-deoxy-β-D-gluc-4-enuronosyl groups

This enzyme belongs to the family of lyases, specifically those carbon-oxygen lyases acting on polysaccharides. The systematic name of this enzyme class is chondroitin AC lyase. Other names in common use include chondroitinase (ambiguous), chondroitin sulfate lyase, chondroitin AC eliminase, chondroitin AC lyase, chondroitinase AC, and ChnAC.

== Structural studies ==
As of late 2007, 11 structures have been solved for this class of enzymes, with PDB accession codes 1CB8, 1HM2, 1HM3, 1HMU, 1HMW, 1RW9, 1RWA, 1RWC, 1RWF, 1RWG, and 1RWH.
