= ADP-dependent NAD(P)H-hydrate dehydratase =

Identifiers
- EC no.: 4.2.1.136

Databases
- IntEnz: IntEnz view
- BRENDA: BRENDA entry
- ExPASy: NiceZyme view
- KEGG: KEGG entry
- MetaCyc: metabolic pathway
- PRIAM: profile
- PDB structures: RCSB PDB PDBe PDBsum
Search
- PMC: articles
- PubMed: articles
- NCBI: proteins

ADP-dependent NAD(P)H-hydrate dehydratase (EC 4.2.1.136, (6S)-β-6-hydroxy-1,4,5,6-tetrahydronicotinamide-adenine-dinucleotide hydro-lyase (ADP-hydrolysing), (6S)-6-β-hydroxy-1,4,5,6-tetrahydronicotinamide-adenine-dinucleotide hydro-lyase (ADP-hydrolysing, NADH-forming)) is an enzyme with systematic name (6S)-6β-hydroxy-1,4,5,6-tetrahydronicotinamide-adenine-dinucleotide hydro-lyase (ADP-hydrolysing; NADH-forming). This enzyme catalyses the following chemical reaction

(1) ADP + (6S)-6β-hydroxy-1,4,5,6-tetrahydronicotinamide-adenine dinucleotide $\rightleftharpoons$ AMP + phosphate + NADH
(2) ADP + (6S)-6β-hydroxy-1,4,5,6-tetrahydronicotinamide-adenine dinucleotide phosphate $\rightleftharpoons$ AMP + phosphate + NADPH

This enzyme acts equally well on hydrated NADH and hydrated NADPH.
