= Levan fructotransferase (DFA-IV-forming) =

Identifiers
- EC no.: 4.2.2.16

Databases
- IntEnz: IntEnz view
- BRENDA: BRENDA entry
- ExPASy: NiceZyme view
- KEGG: KEGG entry
- MetaCyc: metabolic pathway
- PRIAM: profile
- PDB structures: RCSB PDB PDBe PDBsum
Search
- PMC: articles
- PubMed: articles
- NCBI: proteins

The enzyme levan fructotransferase (DFA-IV-forming) (EC 4.2.2.16) catalyzes the following process:

Produces di-β-D-fructofuranose 2,6′:2′,6-dianhydride (DFA IV) by successively eliminating the diminishing (2→6)-β-D-fructan (levan) chain from the terminal D-fructosyl-D-fructosyl disaccharide

This enzyme belongs to the family of lyases, specifically those carbon-oxygen lyases acting on polysaccharides. The systematic name of this enzyme class is 2→6-β-D-fructan lyase (di-β-D-fructofuranose-2,6′:2′,6-dianhydride-forming).

Other names in common use include 2,6-β-D-fructan D-fructosyl-D-fructosyltransferase (forming, di-β-Dfructofuranose 2,6′:2′,6-dianhydride), and levan fructotransferase.
