= L-2-amino-4-chloropent-4-enoate dehydrochlorinase =

Identifiers
- EC no.: 4.5.1.4
- CAS no.: 113066-37-8

Databases
- IntEnz: IntEnz view
- BRENDA: BRENDA entry
- ExPASy: NiceZyme view
- KEGG: KEGG entry
- MetaCyc: metabolic pathway
- PRIAM: profile
- PDB structures: RCSB PDB PDBe PDBsum
- Gene Ontology: AmiGO / QuickGO
Search
- PMC: articles
- PubMed: articles
- NCBI: proteins

The enzyme L-2-amino-4-chloropent-4-enoate dehydrochlorinase (EC 4.5.1.4) catalyzes the reaction

L-2-amino-4-chloropent-4-enoate + H_{2}O $\rightleftharpoons$ 2-oxopent-4-enoate + chloride + NH_{3}

This enzyme belongs to the family of lyases, specifically the class of carbon-halide lyases. The systematic name of this enzyme class is L-2-amino-4-chloropent-4-enoate chloride-lyase (adding water; deaminating; 2-oxopent-4-enoate-forming). Other names in common use include L-2-amino-4-chloro-4-pentenoate dehalogenase, and L-2-amino-4-chloropent-4-enoate chloride-lyase (deaminating).
