= Lactoyl-CoA dehydratase =

lactoyl-CoA dehydratase

Identifiers
- EC no.: 4.2.1.54
- CAS no.: 9031-12-3

Databases
- IntEnz: IntEnz view
- BRENDA: BRENDA entry
- ExPASy: NiceZyme view
- KEGG: KEGG entry
- MetaCyc: metabolic pathway
- PRIAM: profile
- PDB structures: RCSB PDB PDBe PDBsum
- Gene Ontology: AmiGO / QuickGO
Search
- PMC: articles
- PubMed: articles
- NCBI: proteins

The enzyme lactoyl-CoA dehydratase (EC 4.2.1.54) catalyzes the chemical reaction

lactoyl-CoA $\rightleftharpoons$ acryloyl-CoA + H_{2}O

This enzyme belongs to the family of lyases, specifically the hydro-lyases, which cleave carbon-oxygen bonds. The systematic name of this enzyme class is lactoyl-CoA hydro-lyase (acryloyl-CoA-forming). Other names in common use include lactoyl coenzyme A dehydratase, lactyl-coenzyme A dehydrase, lactyl CoA dehydratase, acrylyl coenzyme A hydratase, and lactoyl-CoA hydro-lyase. This enzyme participates in propanoate metabolism and styrene degradation.
