= 4a-hydroxytetrahydrobiopterin dehydratase =

Enzyme

Identifiers
- EC no.: 4.2.1.96

Databases
- IntEnz: IntEnz view
- BRENDA: BRENDA entry
- ExPASy: NiceZyme view
- KEGG: KEGG entry
- MetaCyc: metabolic pathway
- PRIAM: profile
- PDB structures: RCSB PDB PDBe PDBsum
- Gene Ontology: AmiGO / QuickGO
Search
- PMC: articles
- PubMed: articles
- NCBI: proteins

The enzyme 4a-hydroxytetrahydrobiopterin dehydratase (EC 4.2.1.96) catalyzes the chemical reaction

4a-hydroxytetrahydrobiopterin $\rightleftharpoons$ 6,7-dihydrobiopterin + H_{2}O

This enzyme belongs to the family of lyases, specifically the hydro-lyases, which cleave carbon-oxygen bonds. The systematic name of this enzyme class is 4a-hydroxytetrahydrobiopterin hydro-lyase (6,7-dihydrobiopterin-forming). Other names in common use include 4a-hydroxy-tetrahydropterin dehydratase, pterin-4α-carbinolamine dehydratase, and 4a-hydroxytetrahydrobiopterin hydro-lyase.

== Structural studies ==
As of late 2007, 3 structures have been solved for this class of enzymes, with PDB accession codes 1DCO, 1DCP, and 1RU0.
