= Phaseollidin hydratase =

phaseollidin hydratase

Identifiers
- EC no.: 4.2.1.97

Databases
- IntEnz: IntEnz view
- BRENDA: BRENDA entry
- ExPASy: NiceZyme view
- KEGG: KEGG entry
- MetaCyc: metabolic pathway
- PRIAM: profile
- PDB structures: RCSB PDB PDBe PDBsum
- Gene Ontology: AmiGO / QuickGO
Search
- PMC: articles
- PubMed: articles
- NCBI: proteins

The enzyme phaseollidin hydratase (EC 4.2.1.97) catalyzes the chemical reaction

phaseollidin hydrate $\rightleftharpoons$ phaseollidin + H_{2}O

This enzyme belongs to the family of lyases, specifically the hydro-lyases, which cleave carbon-oxygen bonds. The systematic name of this enzyme class is phaseollidin-hydrate hydro-lyase (phaseollidin-forming). This enzyme is also called phaseollidin-hydrate hydro-lyase.
