= 3alpha,7alpha,12alpha-trihydroxy-5beta-cholest-24-enoyl-CoA hydratase =

Enzyme

3α,7α,12α-trihydroxy-5β-cholest-24-enoyl-CoA hydratase

Identifiers
- EC no.: 4.2.1.107

Databases
- IntEnz: IntEnz view
- BRENDA: BRENDA entry
- ExPASy: NiceZyme view
- KEGG: KEGG entry
- MetaCyc: metabolic pathway
- PRIAM: profile
- PDB structures: RCSB PDB PDBe PDBsum
Search
- PMC: articles
- PubMed: articles
- NCBI: proteins

The enzyme 3α,7α,12α-trihydroxy-5β-cholest-24-enoyl-CoA hydratase (EC 4.2.1.107) catalyzes the chemical reaction

(24R,25R)-3α,7α,12α,24-tetrahydroxy-5β-cholestanoyl-CoA $\rightleftharpoons$

(24E)-3α,7α,12α-trihydroxy-5β-cholest-24-enoyl-CoA + H_{2}O

== Nomenclature ==
This enzyme belongs to the family of lyases, specifically the hydro-lyases, which cleave carbon-oxygen bonds. The systematic name of this enzyme class is (24R,25R)-3α,7α,12α,24-tetrahydroxy-5beta-cholestanoyl-CoA hydro-lyase [(24E)-3α,7α,12α-trihydroxy-5β-cholest-24-enoyl-CoA-forming]. Other names in common use include 46 kDa hydratase 2, and (24R,25R)-3α,7α,12α,24-tetrahydroxy-5β-cholestanoyl-CoA hydro-lyase.
