= Octopamine dehydratase =

octopamine dehydratase

Identifiers
- EC no.: 4.2.1.87
- CAS no.: 109456-55-5

Databases
- IntEnz: IntEnz view
- BRENDA: BRENDA entry
- ExPASy: NiceZyme view
- KEGG: KEGG entry
- MetaCyc: metabolic pathway
- PRIAM: profile
- PDB structures: RCSB PDB PDBe PDBsum
- Gene Ontology: AmiGO / QuickGO
Search
- PMC: articles
- PubMed: articles
- NCBI: proteins

The enzyme octopamine dehydratase (EC 4.2.1.87) catalyzes the chemical reaction

1-(4-hydroxyphenyl)-2-aminoethanol $\rightleftharpoons$ (4-hydroxyphenyl)acetaldehyde + NH_{3}

This enzyme belongs to the family of lyases, specifically the hydro-lyases, which cleave carbon-oxygen bonds. The systematic name of this enzyme class is 1-(4-hydroxyphenyl)-2-aminoethanol hydro-lyase [deaminating (4-hydroxyphenyl)acetaldehyde-forming]. Other names in common use include octopamine hydrolyase, and octopamine hydro-lyase (deaminating).
