= S-(hydroxymethyl)glutathione synthase =

Identifiers
- EC no.: 4.4.1.22

Databases
- IntEnz: IntEnz view
- BRENDA: BRENDA entry
- ExPASy: NiceZyme view
- KEGG: KEGG entry
- MetaCyc: metabolic pathway
- PRIAM: profile
- PDB structures: RCSB PDB PDBe PDBsum
- Gene Ontology: AmiGO / QuickGO
Search
- PMC: articles
- PubMed: articles
- NCBI: proteins

The enzyme S-(hydroxymethyl)glutathione synthase (EC 4.4.1.22) catalyzes the reaction

S-(hydroxymethyl)glutathione $\rightleftharpoons$ glutathione + formaldehyde

This enzyme belongs to the family of lyases, specifically the class of carbon-sulfur lyases. The systematic name of this enzyme class is S-(hydroxymethyl)glutathione formaldehyde-lyase (glutathione-forming). Other names in common use include glutathione-dependent formaldehyde-activating enzyme, Gfa, and S-(hydroxymethyl)glutathione formaldehyde-lyase. This enzyme participates in methane metabolism.
