= Serine-sulfate ammonia-lyase =

serine-sulfate ammonia-lyase

Identifiers
- EC no.: 4.3.1.10
- CAS no.: 9054-70-0

Databases
- IntEnz: IntEnz view
- BRENDA: BRENDA entry
- ExPASy: NiceZyme view
- KEGG: KEGG entry
- MetaCyc: metabolic pathway
- PRIAM: profile
- PDB structures: RCSB PDB PDBe PDBsum
- Gene Ontology: AmiGO / QuickGO
Search
- PMC: articles
- PubMed: articles
- NCBI: proteins

The enzyme Serine-sulfate ammonia-lyase (EC 4.3.1.10) catalyzes the chemical reaction

L-serine O-sulfate + H_{2}O $\rightleftharpoons$ pyruvate + NH_{3} + sulfate

This enzyme belongs to the family of lyases, specifically ammonia lyases, which cleave carbon-nitrogen bonds. The systematic name of this enzyme class is L-serine-O-sulfate ammonia-lyase (pyruvate-forming). It is also called (L-SOS)lyase.
