= Exo-(1-4)-α-D-glucan lyase =

Exo-(1→4)-α-D-glucan lyase

Identifiers
- EC no.: 4.2.2.13
- CAS no.: 148710-18-3

Databases
- IntEnz: IntEnz view
- BRENDA: BRENDA entry
- ExPASy: NiceZyme view
- KEGG: KEGG entry
- MetaCyc: metabolic pathway
- PRIAM: profile
- PDB structures: RCSB PDB PDBe PDBsum
Search
- PMC: articles
- PubMed: articles
- NCBI: proteins

The enzyme exo-(1→4)-α-D-glucan lyase (EC 4.2.2.13, α-(1→4)-glucan 1,5-anhydro-D-fructose eliminase, α-1,4-glucan exo-lyase, α-1,4-glucan lyase, GLase) is an enzyme with systematic name (1→4)-α-D-glucan exo-4-lyase (1,5-anhydro-D-fructose-forming). This enzyme catalyses the following chemical reaction

linear α-glucan = (n-1) 1,5-anhydro-D-fructose + D-glucose

The enzyme catalyses the sequential degradation of (1→4)-α-D-glucans from the non-reducing end.
