= UDP-N-acetylglucosamine 4,6-dehydratase (configuration-retaining) =

Class of enzymes

Identifiers
- EC no.: 4.2.1.135

Databases
- IntEnz: IntEnz view
- BRENDA: BRENDA entry
- ExPASy: NiceZyme view
- KEGG: KEGG entry
- MetaCyc: metabolic pathway
- PRIAM: profile
- PDB structures: RCSB PDB PDBe PDBsum
Search
- PMC: articles
- PubMed: articles
- NCBI: proteins

UDP-N-acetylglucosamine 4,6-dehydratase (configuration-retaining) (EC 4.2.1.135, PglF) is an enzyme with systematic name UDP-N-acetyl-α-Dglucosamine hydro-lyase (configuration-retaining; UDP-2-acetamido-2,6-dideoxy-α-Dxylo-hex-4-ulose-forming). This enzyme catalyses the following chemical reaction

UDP-N-acetyl-α-D-glucosamine $\rightleftharpoons$ UDP-2-acetamido-2,6-dideoxy-α-D-xylo-hex-4-ulose + H_{2}O

This enzyme contains NAD^{+} as a cofactor.
