= Beta-phellandrene synthase (neryl-diphosphate-cyclizing) =

Enzyme

β-phellandrene synthase (neryl-diphosphate-cyclizing)

Identifiers
- EC no.: 4.2.3.51

Databases
- IntEnz: IntEnz view
- BRENDA: BRENDA entry
- ExPASy: NiceZyme view
- KEGG: KEGG entry
- MetaCyc: metabolic pathway
- PRIAM: profile
- PDB structures: RCSB PDB PDBe PDBsum
Search
- PMC: articles
- PubMed: articles
- NCBI: proteins

β-Phellandrene synthase (neryl-diphosphate-cyclizing) (EC 4.2.3.51, phellandrene synthase 1, PHS1, monoterpene synthase PHS1) is an enzyme with systematic name neryl-diphosphate diphosphate-lyase (cyclizing; beta-phellandrene-forming). This enzyme catalyses the following chemical reaction

neryl diphosphate $\rightleftharpoons$ β-phellandrene + diphosphate

The enzyme from Solanum lycopersicum has very poor affinity with geranyl diphosphate.
