= (2E,6E)-farnesyl-diphosphate diphosphate-lyase =

(2E,6E)-farnesyl-diphosphate diphosphate-lyase may refer to:

Enzymes

- Epi-isozizaene synthase
- Alpha-bisabolene synthase
- (Z)-gamma-bisabolene synthase
- Beta-farnesene synthase
- (3S,6E)-nerolidol synthase
- (3R,6E)-nerolidol synthase
- (S)-beta-bisabolene synthase
- Gamma-humulene synthase
- (−)-beta-caryophyllene synthase
- (E)-gamma-bisabolene synthase
- Germacrene C synthase
- 5-epiaristolochene synthase
- (+)-cubenene synthase
- (+)-epicubenol synthase
- Zingiberene synthase
- Beta-selinene cyclase
- Cis-muuroladiene synthase
- Beta-eudesmol synthase
- (+)-alpha-barbatene synthase
- Patchoulol synthase
- (E,E)-germacrene B synthase
- Alpha-gurjunene synthase
- Valencene synthase
- Presilphiperfolanol synthase
- (−)-germacrene D synthase
- (+)-delta-selinene synthase
- (+)-germacrene D synthase
- Beta-chamigrene synthase
- Thujopsene synthase
- Alpha-longipinene synthase
- Exo-alpha-bergamotene synthase
- Alpha-santalene synthase
- Beta-santalene synthase
- 10-epi-gamma-eudesmol synthase
- Alpha-eudesmol synthase
- 7-epi-alpha-selinene synthase
- Viridiflorene synthase
- (+)-beta-caryophyllene synthase
- Cubebol synthase
- (+)-gamma-cadinene synthase
- Delta-guaiene synthase
- Gamma-curcumene synthase
- (−)-delta-cadinene synthase
- (+)-T-muurolol synthase
- Bicyclogermacrene synthase
- 7-epi-sesquithujene synthase
- Sesquithujene synthase
- Alpha-humulene synthase
- Beta-sesquiphellandrene synthase
- Alpha-muurolene synthase
- Beta-copaene synthase
- Beta-cubebene synthase
- (+)-sativene synthase
- Alpha-copaene synthase
- Delta6-protoilludene synthase
- Alpha-isocomene synthase
- (E)-2-epi-beta-caryophyllene synthase
- (+)-epi-alpha-bisabolol synthase
- Valerena-4,7(11)-diene synthase
