= C15H24 =

The molecular formula C_{15}H_{24} (molar mass : 204.35 g/mol) may refer to:

== Sesquiterpenes ==
=== Acyclic ===
- Farnesene

=== Monocyclic ===
- Bergamotene
- Bisabolene
- Elemene
- Germacrene
- Humulene
- Zingiberene

=== Bicyclic ===
- Amorpha-4,11-diene
- Aristolochene
- Cadinene
- Caryophyllene
- Guaiene
- Selinene
- Thujopsene
- Valencene

=== Tricyclic ===
- Capnellene
- Cedrene
- Copaene
- Cubebene
- Gurjunene
- Isocomene
- Longifolene
