= Cop4 =

Cop4 or COP4 may refer to:

- 1998 United Nations Climate Change Conference
- Cubebol synthase, an enzyme
- Beta-copaene synthase, an enzyme
- Beta-cubebene synthase, an enzyme
- (+)-sativene synthase, an enzyme
- Orilla/Pumpkin Bay Water Aerodrome, Transport Canada location identifier COP4
- The COP400 series of 4-bit microcontrollers
