= Terpene synthase =

Terpene synthases include:

- β-farnesene synthase
- (3R,6E)-nerolidol synthase
- (-)-α-pinene synthase
- (E)-β-ocimene synthase

These synthases' structures may include:

- Terpene synthase N terminal domain
- Terpene synthase C terminal domain
