= COP3 =

COP3 or COP 3 may refer to:

- 1997 United Nations Climate Change conference, the third session of the Conference of Parties to the UNFCCC (COP 3) in Kyoto, Japan, where the Kyoto Protocol was adopted
- Alpha-muurolene synthase, an enzyme
- Gamma-muurolene synthase, an enzyme
- Lake Rosseau/Onnalinda Point Water Aerodrome, the Transport Canada LID for the aerodrome in Ontario
