= GcoA =

GcoA may refer to:

- (+)-Caryolan-1-ol synthase, an enzyme
- (+)-beta-caryophyllene synthase, an enzyme
