= Farnesyl pyrophosphate cyclase =

Farnesyl pyrophosphate cyclase may refer to the following enzymes:

- 5-epiaristolochene synthase
- (+)-epicubenol synthase
