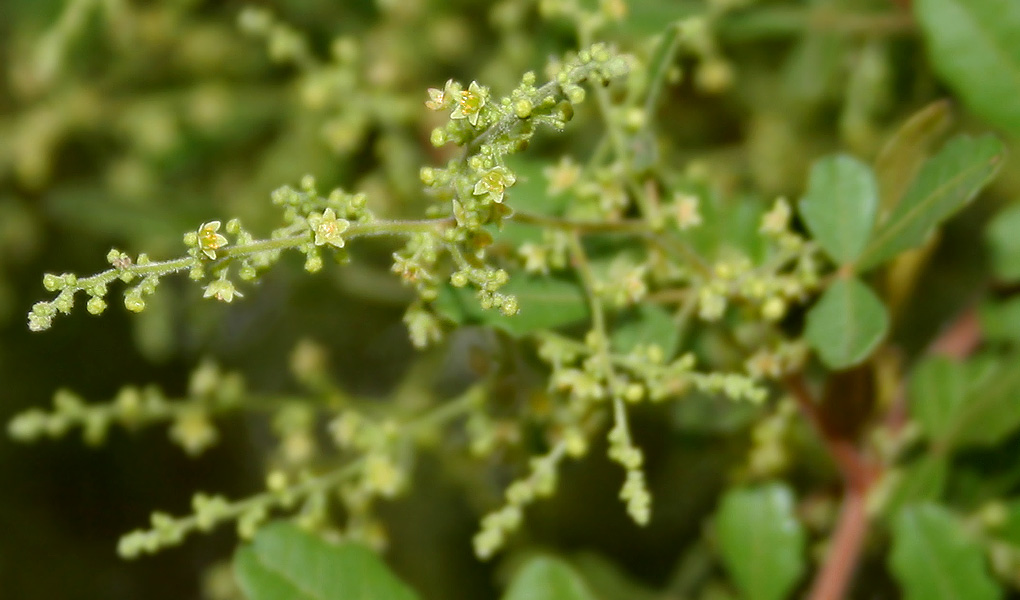

Scientific classification
- Kingdom: Plantae
- Clade: Tracheophytes
- Clade: Angiosperms
- Clade: Eudicots
- Clade: Rosids
- Order: Sapindales
- Family: Anacardiaceae
- Genus: Searsia
- Species: S. mysorensis

Binomial name
- Searsia mysorensis (G.Don) Moffett

Synonyms
- Rhus indica Wight & Arn.; Rhus mysorensis G.Don; Rhus mysurensis B.Heyne ex Wight & Arn., orth. var.; Toxicodendron mysurense (G.Don) Kuntze

= Searsia mysorensis =

Species of flowering plant

Searsia mysorensis (synonym Rhus mysorensis) is a species of shrub with thorny branches. It is commonly known as Mysore sumac or Indian sumac (ചിപ്പമരം in Malayalam).

== Description ==
Leaves are trifoliate or rarely 5-foliate. It flowers and fruits from August to December.

== Distribution ==
It is found in hot and dry places in the Indian states of Karnataka, Andhra Pradesh, Punjab, Haryana, Rajasthan, and Gujarat and in Pakistan.

== Classification ==
The species was first described as Rhus mysorensis by George Don in 1832. In 2007 Rodney Oliver Moffett placed the species in genus Searsia as Searsia mysorensis. Rhus indica Wight & Arn. is a synonym.

== Phytochemistry ==
Phytochemical screening of the plant has identified the presence of several chemical constituents, including cardiac glycosides, saponins, flavonoids, tannins, alkaloids, sterols, and phenols. The plant contains compounds such as limonene, sabinene, α-pinene, β-caryophyllene, as well as α- and β-eudesmol.

== Uses ==
The fruit is used to treat dysentery, and a leaf decoction is administered for itching. Leaves are also used in managing diarrhea and stomatitis, while leaf paste is applied to relieve rashes and allergies. The root, stem, and leaves have been traditionally used to manage diabetes.
