= Falanja =

Falanja (فلنجه) is a red seed (perhaps the seed of cubeb) used in the making of perfumes. It was used to make perfumes by women in the court of Jahangir (1605–1627).
