= Bisabolene =

Bisabolenes
- α-Bisabolene

- β-Bisabolene

- γ-Bisabolene

Names
- IUPAC names (α): (E)-1-Methyl-4-(6-methylhepta-2,5-dien-2-yl)cyclohex-1-ene (β): (S)-1-Methyl-4-(6-methylhepta-1,5-dien-2-yl)cyclohex-1-ene (γ): (Z)-1-Methyl-4-(6-methylhept-5-en-2-ylidene)cyclohex-1-ene

Identifiers
CAS Number	α: 17627-44-0; β: 495-61-4; γ: 495-62-5
3D model (JSmol)	α: Interactive image; β: Interactive image; γ: Interactive image
Beilstein Reference	α: 2414203 β: 2044625 γ: 2501191
ChEBI	α: CHEBI:49244; β: CHEBI:49263; γ: CHEBI:49237
ChemSpider	α: 4509521; β: 8279897; γ: 2298446
KEGG	β: C16775
PubChem CID	α: 5352653; β: 10104370; γ: 3033866
UNII	α: SUQ209P6FX; β: S19BRC22QA; γ: E6941S3U3Q
- InChI: α: InChI=1S/C15H24/c1-12(2)6-5-7-14(4)15-10-8-13(3)9-11-15/h6-8,15H,5,9-11H2,1-4H3/b14-7-; β: InChI=1S/C15H24/c1-12(2)6-5-7-14(4)15-10-8-13(3)9-11-15/h6,8,15H,4-5,7,9-11H2,1-3H3/t15-/m1/s1; γ: InChI=1S/C15H24/c1-12(2)6-5-7-14(4)15-10-8-13(3)9-11-15/h6,8H,5,7,9-11H2,1-4H3/b15-14+
- SMILES: α: CC1=CCC(/C(C)=C/C/C=C(C)/C)CC1; β: CC1=CC[C@@H](C(CC/C=C(C)/C)=C)CC1; γ: CC(CC/1)=CCC1=C(C)/CC/C=C(C)/C

Properties
Chemical formula	C_{15}H_{24}
Molar mass	204.357 g·mol^{−1}
- Except where otherwise noted, data are given for materials in their standard state (at 25 °C [77 °F], 100 kPa). Infobox references

Bisabolenes are a group of closely related natural chemical compounds which are classified as sesquiterpenes. Bisabolenes are produced from farnesyl pyrophosphate (FPP) and are present in the essential oils of bisabol, and of a wide variety of other plants including cubeb, lemon, and oregano. Various derivates also function as pheromones in different insects, such as stink bugs and fruit flies. Bisabolenes are produced by several fungi, though their biological role in that group of organisms remains unclear.

Three isomers are known, α-, β-, and γ-bisabolene, which differ by the positions of the double bonds.

== Uses ==
Bisabolenes are intermediates in the biosynthesis of many other natural chemical compounds, including hernandulcin, a natural sweetener. β-Bisabolene has a balsamic odor and is approved in Europe as a food additive.

Bisabolene has been identified as a biologically producible precursor to a diesel fuel alternative and/or cold weather additive bisabolane.

== See also ==
- Alpha-bisabolene synthase
- (S)-beta-bisabolene synthase
- (E)-gamma-bisabolene synthase
- (Z)-gamma-bisabolene synthase
