= Nootkatin =

Names
- IUPAC name 2-Hydroxy-5-(3-methylbut-2-enyl)-6-propan-2-ylcyclohepta-2,4,6-trien-1-one
- Other names: NSC 43339; NSC 403527

Identifiers
CAS Number	4431-03-2
3D model (JSmol)	Interactive image
ChEMBL	ChEMBL1700891
ChemSpider	208608
PubChem CID	238797
CompTox Dashboard (EPA)	DTXSID10196125
- InChI: InChI=1S/C15H20O2/c1-10(2)5-6-12-7-8-14(16)15(17)9-13(12)11(3)4/h5,7-9,11H,6H2,1-4H3,(H,16,17) Key: MNMNTZYOZZLKSV-UHFFFAOYSA-N
- SMILES: CC(C)C1=CC(=O)C(=CC=C1CC=C(C)C)O

Properties
Chemical formula	C_{15}H_{20}O_{2}
Molar mass	232.323 g·mol^{−1}
Density	g/cm^{3}
Melting point	95 °C (203 °F; 368 K)

Hazards
Flash point	206 °C (403 °F; 479 K)
- Except where otherwise noted, data are given for materials in their standard state (at 25 °C [77 °F], 100 kPa). Infobox references

Nootkatin is a naturally occurring organic compound classified as a sesquiterpenoid with the molecular formula C_{15}H_{20}O_{2}. The compound belongs to the nootkatone family of natural products derived from grapefruit and other citrus sources, distinguished by its special structure featuring multiple double bonds, cycloheptatriene ring, and a ketone functional group. Nootkatin was initially isolated in 1952 from the steam-volative oil of the heartwood of yellow cedar by Carlsson et al.

== Natural occurrence ==
Nootkatin occurs as a minor component in the essential oils of grapefruit (Citrus paradisi) and Alaskan yellow cedar (Callitropsis nootkatensis), formed via oxidative degradation of nootkatone. Biosynthetically, the compound is formed from farnesyl pyrophosphate through cyclization pathways typical of sesquiterpenes, with enzymatic oxidation yielding the ketone functionality.

The compound is also found in such taxons as Juniperus communis, Juniperus thurifera, Juniperus osteosperma, Juniperus taiwaniana, Cupressus torulosa, among others.

== Biological activities ==
Nootkatin displays diverse bioactivities, including potential antimicrobial, antiinflammatory, and insect-repellent properties akin to nootkatone, which is a biopesticide against ticks and mosquitoes.

== See also ==
- Grapefruit mercaptan
- Hinokitiol
- Nootkatone
- Tropolone
