= 10-epi-gamma-eudesmol synthase =

Class of enzymes

10-epi-γ-eudesmol synthase

Identifiers
- EC no.: 4.2.3.84

Databases
- IntEnz: IntEnz view
- BRENDA: BRENDA entry
- ExPASy: NiceZyme view
- KEGG: KEGG entry
- MetaCyc: metabolic pathway
- PRIAM: profile
- PDB structures: RCSB PDB PDBe PDBsum
Search
- PMC: articles
- PubMed: articles
- NCBI: proteins

10-epi-γ-Eudesmol synthase (EC 4.2.3.84) is an enzyme with systematic name (2E,6E)-farnesyl-diphosphate diphosphate-lyase (10-epi-γ-eudesmol-forming). This enzyme catalyses the following chemical reaction:

(2E,6E)-farnesyl diphosphate + H_{2}O $\rightleftharpoons$ 10-epi-γ-eudesmol + diphosphate

The recombinant enzyme from ginger (Zingiber zerumbet) forms β-eudesmol, 10-epi-γ-eudesmol, α-eudesmol and aristolene.
