= (+)-alpha-barbatene synthase =

Class of enzymes

(+)-α-barbatene synthase

Identifiers
- EC no.: 4.2.3.69

Databases
- IntEnz: IntEnz view
- BRENDA: BRENDA entry
- ExPASy: NiceZyme view
- KEGG: KEGG entry
- MetaCyc: metabolic pathway
- PRIAM: profile
- PDB structures: RCSB PDB PDBe PDBsum
Search
- PMC: articles
- PubMed: articles
- NCBI: proteins

(+)-α-Barbatene synthase (EC 4.2.3.69, AtBS) is an enzyme with systematic name (2E,6E)-farnesyl-diphosphate diphosphate-lyase ((+)-α-barbatene-forming). This enzyme catalyses the following chemical reaction

(2E,6E)-farnesyl diphosphate $\rightleftharpoons$ (+)-α-barbatene + diphosphate

The recombinant enzyme from the plant Arabidopsis thaliana produces α-barbatene, thujopsene and β-chamigrene.
