= Alpha-humulene synthase =

Class of enzymes

α-humulene synthase

Identifiers
- EC no.: 4.2.3.104

Databases
- IntEnz: IntEnz view
- BRENDA: BRENDA entry
- ExPASy: NiceZyme view
- KEGG: KEGG entry
- MetaCyc: metabolic pathway
- PRIAM: profile
- PDB structures: RCSB PDB PDBe PDBsum
Search
- PMC: articles
- PubMed: articles
- NCBI: proteins

α-Humulene synthase (EC 4.2.3.104,ZSS1) is an enzyme with a systematic name (2E,6E)-farnesyl-diphosphate diphosphate-lyase (α-humulene-forming). This enzyme catalyses the following chemical reaction:

(2E,6E)-farnesyl diphosphate $\rightleftharpoons$ α-humulene + diphosphate

The enzyme from Zingiber zerumbet, can be used to make shampoo ginger. It also gives traces of β-caryophyllene.
