= Gurjunene =

Names
- IUPAC name (1aR,4R,4aR,7bS)-1,1,4,7-Tetramethyl-1a,2,3,4,4a,5,6,7b-octahydrocyclopropa[e]azulene
- Other names (-)-α-Gurjunene

Identifiers
CAS Number	489-40-7
3D model (JSmol)	Interactive image
ChEBI	CHEBI:61699
ChemSpider	10219452
ECHA InfoCard	100.006.996
EC Number	207-695-1
KEGG	C19734
PubChem CID	15560276
CompTox Dashboard (EPA)	DTXSID0052126
- InChI: InChI=1S/C15H24/c1-9-6-8-12-14(15(12,3)4)13-10(2)5-7-11(9)13/h9,11-12,14H,5-8H2,1-4H3/t9-,11-,12-,14-/m1/s1 Key: SPCXZDDGSGTVAW-XIDUGBJDSA-N
- SMILES: C[C@@H]1CC[C@@H]2[C@@H](C2(C)C)C3=C(CC[C@H]13)C

Properties
Chemical formula	C_{15}H_{24}
Molar mass	204.357 g·mol^{−1}
- Except where otherwise noted, data are given for materials in their standard state (at 25 °C [77 °F], 100 kPa). Infobox references

Gurjunene, also known as (-)-α-gurjunene, is a natural carbotricyclic sesquiterpene that is most commonly found in gurjun balsam, an essential oil compound extracted from plants of the genus Dipterocarpus. The following reaction that synthesizes gurjunene can be catalyzed by alpha-gurjunene synthase:

(2E,6E)-farnesyl diphosphate $\rightleftharpoons$ (–)-α-gurjunene + diphosphate

== Related compounds ==
Several related compounds are known, including β-gurjunene and γ-gurjunene.

β-Gurjunene

γ-Gurjunene
