= Eugène Soubeiran =

French scientist

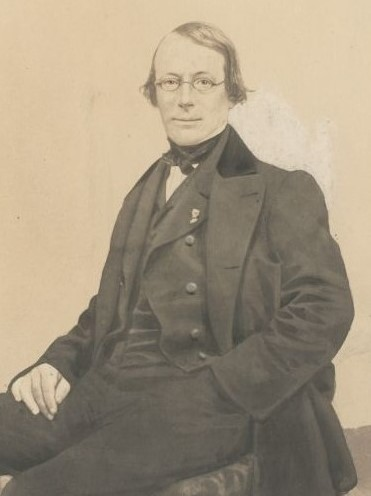
Eugène Soubeiran

Eugène Soubeiran (5 December 1797, in Paris – 17 November 1859, in Paris) was a French scientist.

From 1823 he served as chief pharmacist at La Pitie Hospital in Paris. In 1832 he became director of Pharmacie Centrale, a drug manufacturing and distribution center for the hospitals and hospices of Paris (hôpitaux et hospices de Paris). The following year, he was chosen as an assistant professor of pharmacy, subsequently taking charge of the chair of physics at the Ecole de Pharmacie. After receiving his medical degree, he was appointed to the chair of pharmacy at the Faculty of Medicine (1853).

He was one of three researchers who discovered chloroform independently of one another. Soubeiran was the first to publish his findings, but it is difficult to determine who was actually first to make the discovery, as each may have allowed an interval of time to elapse between discovery and publication. In 1839, with Hyacinthe Capitaine, he was co-discoverer of cubebin.

== Publications ==
- Recherches analitiques sur la crème de tartre soluble par l'acide borique, présentées à l'Ecole spéciale de Pharmacie, 1824 - Analytical research on cream of tartar soluble with boric acid, presented at the Ecole spéciale de Pharmacie.
- Handbuch der pharmaceutischen Praxis, oder ausführliche Darstellung der pharmaceutischen Operationen, sammt den gewähltesten Beispielen ihrer Anwendung . Winter, Heidelberg 1839.
- Mémoire sur les camphènes, 1840 (with Hyacinthe Capitaine) - Memorandum on camphenes.
- Nouveau traité de pharmacie théorique et pratique, 1840 - New treatise on theoretical and practical pharmacy.
- Précis élémentaire de physique, ou Traité de physique facile, 1842 - Specific elementary physics.
