= Cubebol =

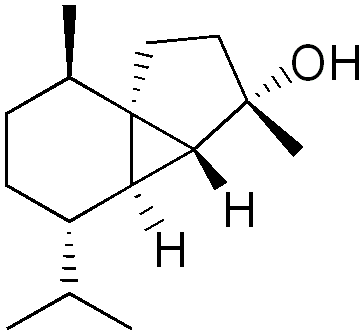

Names
- Preferred IUPAC name (3S,3aR,3bR,4S,7R,7aR)-3,7-Dimethyl-4-(propan-2-yl)octahydro-1H-cyclopenta[1,3]cyclopropa[1,2-a]benzen-3-ol

Identifiers
CAS Number	23445-02-5
3D model (JSmol)	Interactive image; Interactive image
ChemSpider	9451107
PubChem CID	11276107
UNII	9C9ZTS2B3U
CompTox Dashboard (EPA)	DTXSID90177997
- InChI: InChI=1S/C15H26O/c1-9(2)11-6-5-10(3)15-8-7-14(4,16)13(15)12(11)15/h9-13,16H,5-8H2,1-4H3/t10-,11+,12-,13+,14+,15-/m1/s1 Key: KONGRWVLXLWGDV-BYGOPZEFSA-N; InChI=1/C15H26O/c1-9(2)11-6-5-10(3)15-8-7-14(4,16)13(15)12(11)15/h9-13,16H,5-8H2,1-4H3/t10-,11+,12-,13+,14+,15-/m1/s1 Key: KONGRWVLXLWGDV-BYGOPZEFBC
- SMILES: [H][C@]12[C@H]([C@H](C)C)CC[C@@H](C)[C@]31[C@@]([H])2[C@@](C)(O)CC3; O[C@]3(CC[C@@]12[C@@H](CC[C@H]([C@@H]1[C@H]23)C(C)C)C)C

Properties
Chemical formula	C_{15}H_{26}O
Molar mass	222.37 g/mol
Melting point	61 to 62 °C (142 to 144 °F; 334 to 335 K)
- Except where otherwise noted, data are given for materials in their standard state (at 25 °C [77 °F], 100 kPa). verify (what is ?) Infobox references

Cubebol is a natural sesquiterpene alcohol first identified in cubeb oil. It is also found in basil. It was patented as a cooling agent in 2001 by Firmenich, an international flavor company. The taste of cubebol is cooling and refreshing. The patent describes application of cubebol as a refreshing agent in various products, ranging from chewing gum to sorbets, drinks, toothpaste, and gelatin-based confectioneries.
