= Nootkatone =

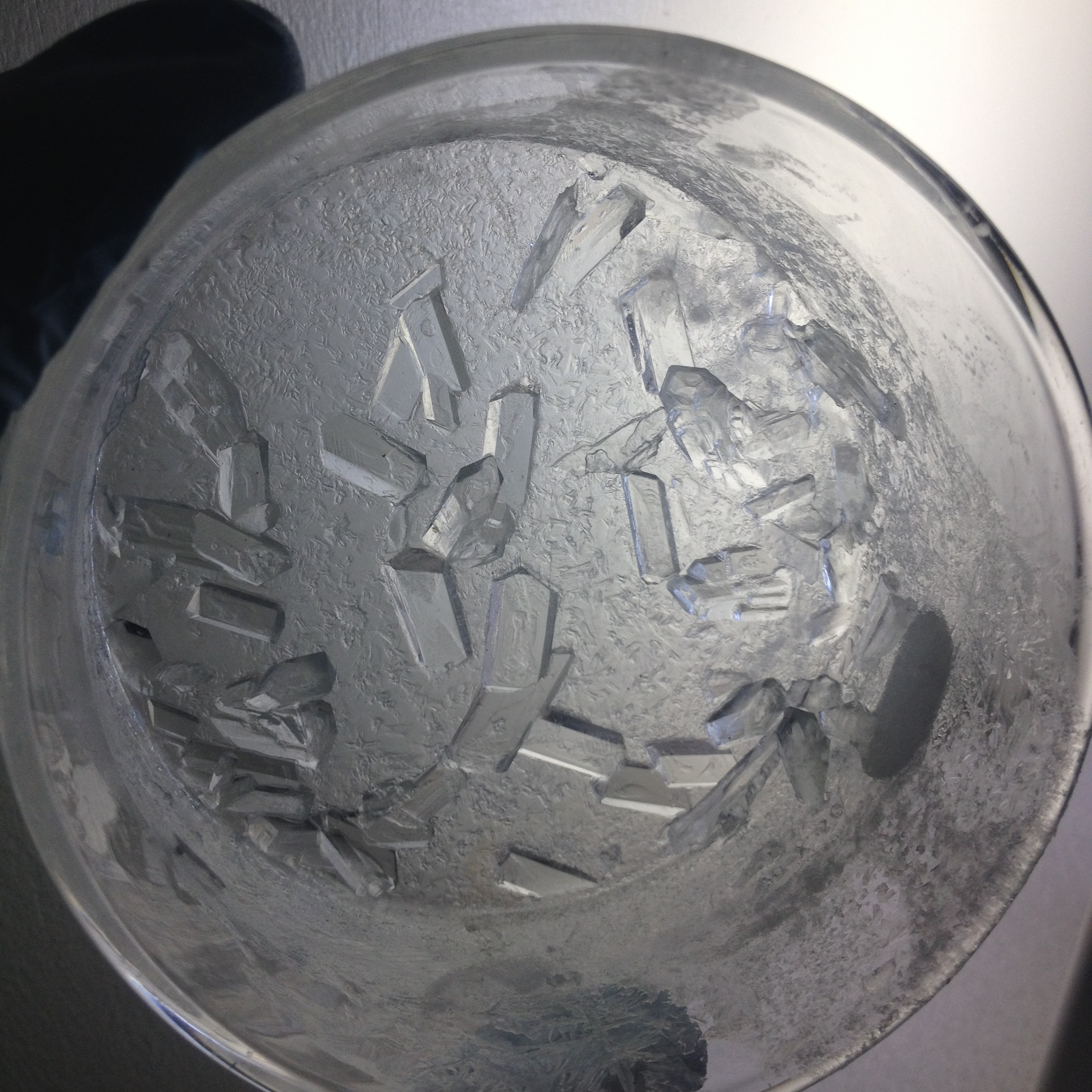
- Nootkatone crystals

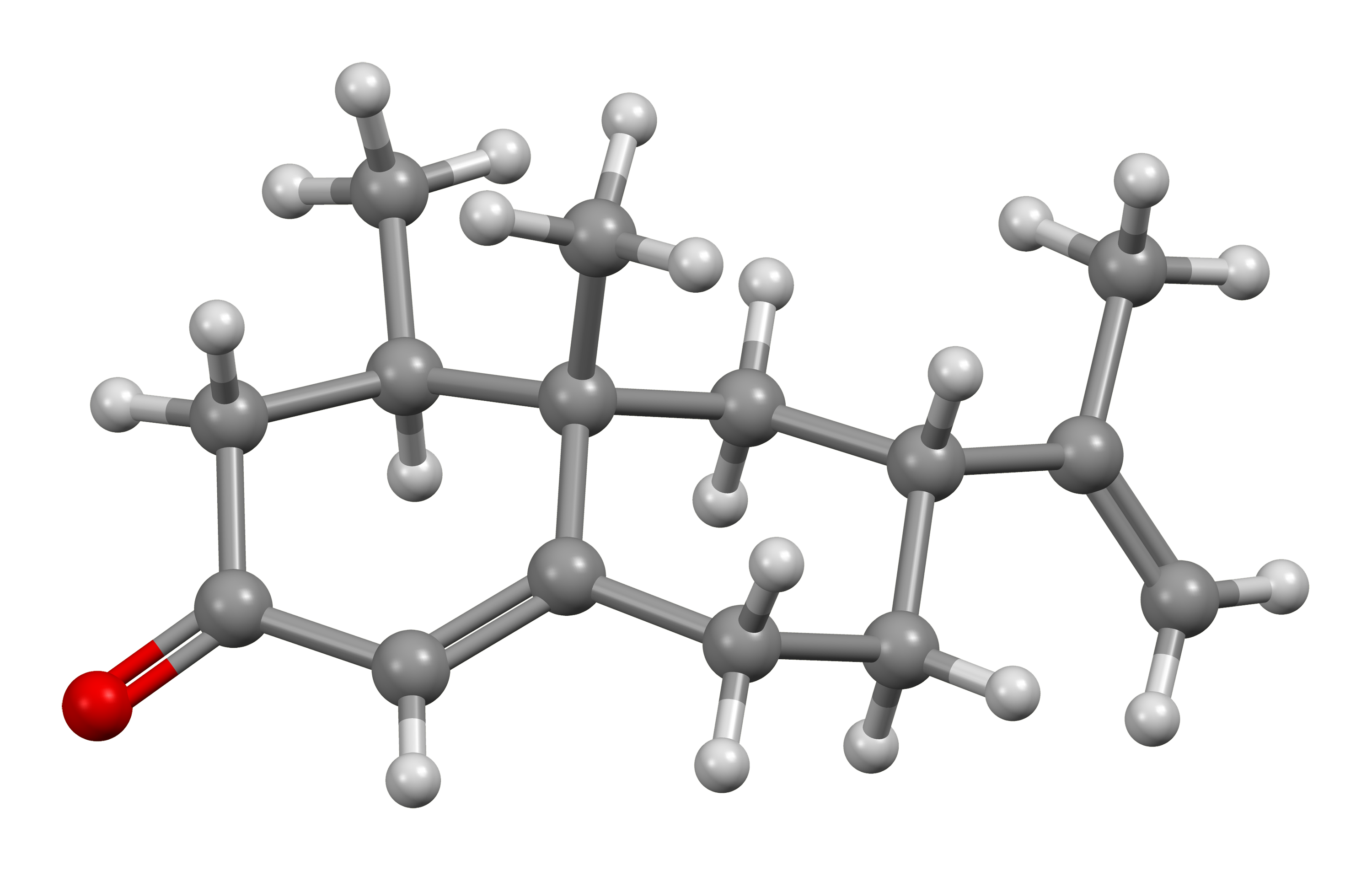

Names
- IUPAC name 4α,5α-Eremophila-1(10),11-dien-2-one
- Systematic IUPAC name (4R,4aS,6R)-4,4a-Dimethyl-6-(prop-1-en-2-yl)-4,4a,5,6,7,8-hexahydronaphthalen-2(3H)-one
- Other names (+)-nootkatone

Identifiers
CAS Number	4674-50-4
3D model (JSmol)	Interactive image
ChEBI	CHEBI:81377
ChEMBL	ChEMBL446299
ChemSpider	1064812
ECHA InfoCard	100.022.840
KEGG	C17914
PubChem CID	1268142
UNII	IZ2Y119N4J
CompTox Dashboard (EPA)	DTXSID8047050
- InChI: InChI=1S/C15H22O/c1-10(2)12-5-6-13-8-14(16)7-11(3)15(13,4)9-12/h8,11-12H,1,5-7,9H2,2-4H3/t11-,12-,15+/m1/s1 Key: WTOYNNBCKUYIKC-JMSVASOKSA-N; InChI=1/C15H22O/c1-10(2)12-5-6-13-8-14(16)7-11(3)15(13,4)9-12/h8,11-12H,1,5-7,9H2,2-4H3/t11-,12-,15+/m1/s1 Key: WTOYNNBCKUYIKC-JMSVASOKBQ
- SMILES: O=C2\C=C1\CC[C@@H](C(=C)C)C[C@@]1(C)[C@H](C)C2

Properties
Chemical formula	C_{15}H_{22}O
Molar mass	218.340 g·mol^{−1}
Appearance	Clear or white crystals, impure samples appear as a viscous yellow liquid
Density	0.968 g/mL
Melting point	36 °C (97 °F; 309 K)
Boiling point	170 °C (338 °F; 443 K)
Solubility in water	Insoluble in water, very soluble in ethanol, dichloromethane, ethyl acetate, soluble in hexanes

Hazards
- GHS labelling
Pictograms	(GHS07: Exclamation mark)
Signal word	Warning
Hazard statements	H317
Precautionary statements	P280
Flash point	~ 100 °C (212 °F; 373 K)

Related compounds
Related terpenes	Valencene
- Except where otherwise noted, data are given for materials in their standard state (at 25 °C [77 °F], 100 kPa). verify (what is ?) Infobox references

Nootkatone is an organic compound, a sesquiterpenoid, which means that it is a C15 derivative that also contains an oxygen-containing functional group (a ketone). It is the most valuable aroma compound of grapefruit. Nootkatone was originally isolated from the wood of the Alaskan yellow cedar, Cupressus nootkatensis. The species name, nootkatensis, is derived from the language of the Nuu-Chah-Nulth people of Canada (formerly referred to as the Nootka people).

== Production ==
Nootkatone is produced commercially from valencene, another more abundant sesquiterpene.

The conversion of valencene to nootkatone is an example of allylic oxidation.

Allylix (Now Lallemand of Montreal, PQ), developed a fermentation process to nootkatone.

== Mechanism of action ==
As is true of other plant terpenoids, nootkatone activates α-adrenergic type 1 octopamine receptor (PaOA1) in susceptible arthropods, causing fatal spasms.

== Uses ==
Nootkatone in spray form is an effective repellent or insecticide against deer ticks and lone star ticks. It is also an effective repellent or insecticide against mosquitos, and may repel bed bugs, head lice, Formosan termites, and other insects. It is an environmentally friendly insecticide because it is a volatile essential oil that does not persist in the environment. It was approved by the U.S. EPA for this use on August 10, 2020. Its ability to repel ticks, mosquitoes, and other insects may last for hours, in contrast to other plant-based oil repellants like citronella, peppermint oil, and lemongrass oil. It is nontoxic to humans, is an approved food additive, and is commonly used in foods, cosmetics, and pharmaceuticals. The CDC has licensed patents to two companies to produce an insecticide and an insect repellant.

== See also ==
- Grapefruit mercaptan
- Nootkatin
