= Delta-guaiene synthase =

δ-guaiene synthase

Identifiers
- EC no.: 4.2.3.93

Databases
- IntEnz: IntEnz view
- BRENDA: BRENDA entry
- ExPASy: NiceZyme view
- KEGG: KEGG entry
- MetaCyc: metabolic pathway
- PRIAM: profile
- PDB structures: RCSB PDB PDBe PDBsum
Search
- PMC: articles
- PubMed: articles
- NCBI: proteins

δ-Guaiene synthase (EC 4.2.3.93) is an enzyme with systematic name (2E,6E))-farnesyl-diphosphate diphosphate-lyase (cyclizing, δ-guaiene-forming). This enzyme catalyses the following chemical reaction

(2E,6E)-farnesyl diphosphate $\rightleftharpoons$ δ-guaiene + diphosphate

This enzyme requires Mg^{2+}.
