= (+)-Caryolan-1-ol synthase =

Class of enzymes

Identifiers
- EC no.: 4.2.1.138

Databases
- IntEnz: IntEnz view
- BRENDA: BRENDA entry
- ExPASy: NiceZyme view
- KEGG: KEGG entry
- MetaCyc: metabolic pathway
- PRIAM: profile
- PDB structures: RCSB PDB PDBe PDBsum
Search
- PMC: articles
- PubMed: articles
- NCBI: proteins

(+)-Caryolan-1-ol synthase (EC 4.2.1.138, GcoA) is an enzyme with systematic name (+)-β-caryophyllene hydrolase (cyclizing, (+)-caryolan-1-ol-forming). This enzyme catalyses the following chemical reaction

(+)-β-caryophyllene + H_{2}O $\rightleftharpoons$ (+)-caryolan-1-ol

This enzyme also forms (+)-β-caryophyllene from farnesyl diphosphate (EC 4.2.3.89).
