= Cis-muuroladiene synthase =

cis-Muuroladiene synthase

Identifiers
- EC no.: 4.2.3.67

Databases
- IntEnz: IntEnz view
- BRENDA: BRENDA entry
- ExPASy: NiceZyme view
- KEGG: KEGG entry
- MetaCyc: metabolic pathway
- PRIAM: profile
- PDB structures: RCSB PDB PDBe PDBsum
Search
- PMC: articles
- PubMed: articles
- NCBI: proteins

cis-Muuroladiene synthase (EC 4.2.3.67, MxpSS1) is an enzyme with systematic name (2E,6E)-farnesyl-diphosphate diphosphate-lyase (cis-muuroladiene-forming). This enzyme catalyses the following chemical reactions

(1) (2E,6E)-farnesyl diphosphate $\rightleftharpoons$ cis-muurola-3,5-diene + diphosphate
(2) (2E,6E)-farnesyl diphosphate $\rightleftharpoons$ cis-muurola-4(14),5-diene + diphosphate

The recombinant enzyme from black peppermint produces a mixture of cis-muurola-3,5-diene and cis-muurola-4(14),5-diene.
