= Bicyclogermacrene synthase =

Enzyme

Identifiers
- EC no.: 4.2.3.100

Databases
- IntEnz: IntEnz view
- BRENDA: BRENDA entry
- ExPASy: NiceZyme view
- KEGG: KEGG entry
- MetaCyc: metabolic pathway
- PRIAM: profile
- PDB structures: RCSB PDB PDBe PDBsum
Search
- PMC: articles
- PubMed: articles
- NCBI: proteins

Bicyclogermacrene synthase (EC 4.2.3.100, Ov-TPS4) is an enzyme with systematic name (2E,6E))-farnesyl-diphosphate diphosphate-lyase (bicyclogermacrene-forming). This enzyme catalyses the following chemical reaction

(2E,6E)-farnesyl diphosphate $\rightleftharpoons$ bicyclogermacrene + diphosphate

The enzyme from oregano (Origanum vulgare) gives mainly bicyclogermacrene with Mn^{2+} as a cofactor.
