= Beta-chamigrene synthase =

Class of enzymes

β-chamigrene synthase

Identifiers
- EC no.: 4.2.3.78

Databases
- IntEnz: IntEnz view
- BRENDA: BRENDA entry
- ExPASy: NiceZyme view
- KEGG: KEGG entry
- MetaCyc: metabolic pathway
- PRIAM: profile
- PDB structures: RCSB PDB PDBe PDBsum
Search
- PMC: articles
- PubMed: articles
- NCBI: proteins

β-Chamigrene synthase (EC 4.2.3.78) is an enzyme with systematic name (2E,6E)-farnesyl diphosphate lyase (cyclizing, (+)-β-chamigrene-forming). This enzyme catalyses the following chemical reaction

(2E,6E)-farnesyl diphosphate $\rightleftharpoons$ (+)-β-chamigrene + diphosphate

The recombinant enzyme from the plant Arabidopsis thaliana produces (+)-α-barbatene, (+)-thujopsene and (+)-β-chamigrene.
