= Gamma-muurolene synthase =

γ-muurolene synthase

Identifiers
- EC no.: 4.2.3.126

Databases
- IntEnz: IntEnz view
- BRENDA: BRENDA entry
- ExPASy: NiceZyme view
- KEGG: KEGG entry
- MetaCyc: metabolic pathway
- PRIAM: profile
- PDB structures: RCSB PDB PDBe PDBsum
Search
- PMC: articles
- PubMed: articles
- NCBI: proteins

γ-Muurolene synthase (EC 4.2.3.126, Cop3) is an enzyme with systematic name (2E,6E)-farnesyl-diphosphate diphosphate-lase (cyclizing, γ-muurolene-forming). This enzyme catalyses the following chemical reaction

(2E,6E)-farnesyl diphosphate $\rightleftharpoons$ γ-muurolene + diphosphate

The enzyme has been characterized from the fungus Coprinus cinereus.
