= Presilphiperfolanol synthase =

Identifiers
- EC no.: 4.2.3.74

Databases
- IntEnz: IntEnz view
- BRENDA: BRENDA entry
- ExPASy: NiceZyme view
- KEGG: KEGG entry
- MetaCyc: metabolic pathway
- PRIAM: profile
- PDB structures: RCSB PDB PDBe PDBsum
Search
- PMC: articles
- PubMed: articles
- NCBI: proteins

Presilphiperfolanol synthase (EC 4.2.3.74, BcBOT2, CND15) is an enzyme with systematic name (2E,6E)-farnesyl-diphosphate diphosphohydrolase (presilphiperfolan-8β-ol-forming). This enzyme catalyses the following chemical reaction

(2E,6E)-farnesyl diphosphate + H_{2}O $\rightleftharpoons$ presilphiperfolan-8β-ol + diphosphate

This enzyme requires Mg^{2+}.
