= (−)-delta-cadinene synthase =

Class of enzymes

(−)-δ-cadinene synthase

Identifiers
- EC no.: 4.2.3.97

Databases
- IntEnz: IntEnz view
- BRENDA: BRENDA entry
- ExPASy: NiceZyme view
- KEGG: KEGG entry
- MetaCyc: metabolic pathway
- PRIAM: profile
- PDB structures: RCSB PDB PDBe PDBsum
Search
- PMC: articles
- PubMed: articles
- NCBI: proteins

(−)-δ-Cadinene synthase (EC 4.2.3.97) is an enzyme with systematic name (2E,6E)-farnesyl-diphosphate diphosphate-lyase (cyclizing, (−)-δ-cadinene-forming). This enzyme catalyses the following chemical reaction

(2E,6E)-farnesyl diphosphate $\rightleftharpoons$ (−)-δ-cadinene + diphosphate

The cyclization mechanism involves an intermediate nerolidyl diphosphate.
