= (E,E)-germacrene B synthase =

Class of enzymes

Identifiers
- EC no.: 4.2.3.71

Databases
- IntEnz: IntEnz view
- BRENDA: BRENDA entry
- ExPASy: NiceZyme view
- KEGG: KEGG entry
- MetaCyc: metabolic pathway
- PRIAM: profile
- PDB structures: RCSB PDB PDBe PDBsum
Search
- PMC: articles
- PubMed: articles
- NCBI: proteins

(E,E)-germacrene B synthase (EC 4.2.3.71) is an enzyme with systematic name (2E,6E)-farnesyl-diphosphate diphosphate-lyase ((E,E)-germacrene-B-forming). This enzyme catalyses the following chemical reaction

(2E,6E)-farnesyl diphosphate $\rightleftharpoons$ (E,E)-germacrene B + diphosphate
