= Alpha-santalene synthase =

Class of enzymes

α-santalene synthase

Identifiers
- EC no.: 4.2.3.82

Databases
- IntEnz: IntEnz view
- BRENDA: BRENDA entry
- ExPASy: NiceZyme view
- KEGG: KEGG entry
- MetaCyc: metabolic pathway
- PRIAM: profile
- PDB structures: RCSB PDB PDBe PDBsum
Search
- PMC: articles
- PubMed: articles
- NCBI: proteins

α-Santalene synthase (EC 4.2.3.82) is an enzyme with systematic name (2E,6E)-farnesyl diphosphate lyase (cyclizing, (+)-α-santalene-forming). This enzyme catalyses the following chemical reaction

(2E,6E)-farnesyl diphosphate $\rightleftharpoons$ (+)-α-santalene + diphosphate

The enzyme synthesizes a mixture of sesquiterpenes.
