= Valencene synthase =

Class of enzymes

Identifiers
- EC no.: 4.2.3.73

Databases
- IntEnz: IntEnz view
- BRENDA: BRENDA entry
- ExPASy: NiceZyme view
- KEGG: KEGG entry
- MetaCyc: metabolic pathway
- PRIAM: profile
- PDB structures: RCSB PDB PDBe PDBsum
Search
- PMC: articles
- PubMed: articles
- NCBI: proteins

Valencene synthase (EC 4.2.3.73) is an enzyme with systematic name (2E,6E)-farnesyl-diphosphate diphosphate-lyase (valencene-forming). It is a terpene cyclase enzyme responsible for the biosynthesis of valencene, a sesquiterpene, using farnesyl pyrophosphate as its substrate. The first such enzyme was isolated using orange cDNA. This enzyme catalyses the following chemical reaction

(2E,6E)-farnesyl diphosphate $\rightleftharpoons$ (+)-valencene + diphosphate

The recombinant enzyme from Vitis vinifera forms (+)-valencene and (-)-7-epi-α-selinene.
