= Delta6-protoilludene synthase =

Δ^{6}-protoilludene synthase

Identifiers
- EC no.: 4.2.3.135

Databases
- IntEnz: IntEnz view
- BRENDA: BRENDA entry
- ExPASy: NiceZyme view
- KEGG: KEGG entry
- MetaCyc: metabolic pathway
- PRIAM: profile
- PDB structures: RCSB PDB PDBe PDBsum
Search
- PMC: articles
- PubMed: articles
- NCBI: proteins

Δ^{6}-Protoilludene synthase (EC 4.2.3.135, 6-protoilludene synthase) is an enzyme with systematic name (2E,6E)-farnesyl-diphosphate diphosphate-lyase (cyclizing, Δ^{6}-protoilludene-forming). This enzyme catalyses the following chemical reaction

(2E,6E)-farnesyl diphosphate $\rightleftharpoons$ Δ^{6}-protoilludene + diphosphate

This enzyme is isolated from the fungus Armillaria gallica.
