= (+)-germacrene D synthase =

Class of enzymes

Identifiers
- EC no.: 4.2.3.77

Databases
- IntEnz: IntEnz view
- BRENDA: BRENDA entry
- ExPASy: NiceZyme view
- KEGG: KEGG entry
- MetaCyc: metabolic pathway
- PRIAM: profile
- PDB structures: RCSB PDB PDBe PDBsum
Search
- PMC: articles
- PubMed: articles
- NCBI: proteins

(+)-Germacrene D synthase (EC 4.2.3.77) is an enzyme with systematic name (2E,6E)-farnesyl-diphosphate diphosphate-lyase ((+)-germacrene-D-forming). This enzyme catalyses the following chemical reaction

(2E,6E)-farnesyl diphosphate $\rightleftharpoons$ (+)-germacrene D + diphosphate

This enzyme requires Mg^{2+}, Mn^{2+}, Ni^{2+} or Co^{2+}.
