= Gamma-curcumene synthase =

γ-curcumene synthase

Identifiers
- EC no.: 4.2.3.94

Databases
- IntEnz: IntEnz view
- BRENDA: BRENDA entry
- ExPASy: NiceZyme view
- KEGG: KEGG entry
- MetaCyc: metabolic pathway
- PRIAM: profile
- PDB structures: RCSB PDB PDBe PDBsum
Search
- PMC: articles
- PubMed: articles
- NCBI: proteins

γ-Curcumene synthase (EC 4.2.3.94, PatTpsA (gene)) is an enzyme with systematic name (2E,6E)-farnesyl-diphosphate diphosphate-lyase (cyclizing, γ-curcumene-forming). This enzyme catalyses the following chemical reaction

(2E,6E)-farnesyl diphosphate $\rightleftharpoons$ γ-curcumene + diphosphate

This enzyme is one of five sesquiterpenoid synthases in Pogostemon cablin (patchouli).
