= Alpha-copaene synthase =

Enzyme

α-copaene synthase

Identifiers
- EC no.: 4.2.3.133

Databases
- BRENDA: enzyme data
- ExPASy: NiceZyme view
- KEGG: enzyme entry
- MetaCyc: metabolic pathway
- Rhea: reactions
- PDB structures: RCSB PDB PDBe PDBsum
Search
- PMC: articles
- PubMed: articles
- NCBI: proteins

α-Copaene synthase (EC 4.2.3.133) is an enzyme with systematic name (2E,6E)-farnesyl-diphosphate diphosphate-lyase (cyclizing, α-copaene-forming). This enzyme catalyses the following chemical reaction

(2E,6E)-farnesyl diphosphate $\rightleftharpoons$ (–)-α-copaene + diphosphate

This enzyme is isolated from Helianthus annuus (sunflower).
