= (+)-gamma-cadinene synthase =

Class of enzymes

(+)-γ-cadinene synthase

Identifiers
- EC no.: 4.2.3.92

Databases
- IntEnz: IntEnz view
- BRENDA: BRENDA entry
- ExPASy: NiceZyme view
- KEGG: KEGG entry
- MetaCyc: metabolic pathway
- PRIAM: profile
- PDB structures: RCSB PDB PDBe PDBsum
Search
- PMC: articles
- PubMed: articles
- NCBI: proteins

(+)-γ-Cadinene synthase (EC 4.2.3.92) is an enzyme with systematic name (2E,6E)-farnesyl-diphosphate diphosphate-lyase ((+)-γ-cadinene-forming). This enzyme catalyses the following chemical reaction

(2E,6E)-farnesyl diphosphate $\rightleftharpoons$ (+)-γ-cadinene + diphosphate

The enzyme from the melon, Cucumis melo, forms mainly δ- and γ-cadinene.
