= (−)-beta-caryophyllene synthase =

Class of enzymes

(−)-β-caryophyllene synthase

Identifiers
- EC no.: 4.2.3.57
- CAS no.: 110639-18-4

Databases
- IntEnz: IntEnz view
- BRENDA: BRENDA entry
- ExPASy: NiceZyme view
- KEGG: KEGG entry
- MetaCyc: metabolic pathway
- PRIAM: profile
- PDB structures: RCSB PDB PDBe PDBsum
Search
- PMC: articles
- PubMed: articles
- NCBI: proteins

(−)-β-Caryophyllene synthase (EC 4.2.3.57, β-caryophyllene synthase) is an enzyme with systematic name (2E,6E)-farnesyl-diphosphate diphosphate-lyase ((−)-β-caryophyllene-forming). This enzyme catalyses the following chemical reaction

(2E,6E)-farnesyl diphosphate $\rightleftharpoons$ (−)-β-caryophyllene + diphosphate

This enzyme is widely distributed in higher plants.
