= Zingiberene =

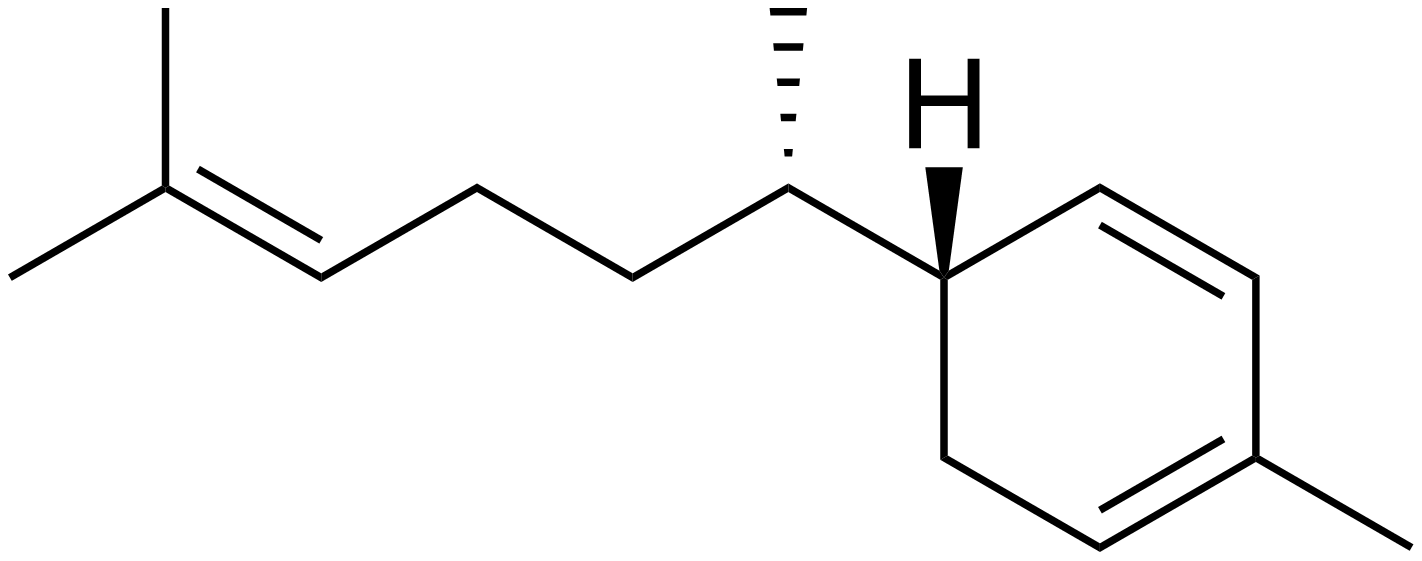
- Stereo, skeletal formula of zingiberene

Names
- Preferred IUPAC name 2-Methyl-5-(6-methylhept-5-en-2-yl)cyclohexa-1,3-diene

Identifiers
CAS Number	495-60-3
3D model (JSmol)	Interactive image
Beilstein Reference	2554989
ChEBI	CHEBI:10115
ChEMBL	ChEMBL479020
ChemSpider	83751
ECHA InfoCard	100.007.096
EC Number	207-804-2
KEGG	C09750
MeSH	zingiberene
PubChem CID	92776
UNII	8XOC63EI5F
CompTox Dashboard (EPA)	DTXSID00197808
- InChI: InChI=1S/C15H24/c1-12(2)6-5-7-14(4)15-10-8-13(3)9-11-15/h6,8-10,14-15H,5,7,11H2,1-4H3/t14-,15+/m0/s1 Key: KKOXKGNSUHTUBV-LSDHHAIUSA-N; Key: KKOXKGNSUHTUBV-LSDHHAIUBW
- SMILES: C[C@@H](CCC=C(C)C)[C@H]1CC=C(C)C=C1

Properties
Chemical formula	C_{15}H_{24}
Molar mass	204.357 g·mol^{−1}
Density	871.3 mg cm^{−3} (at 20 °C)
Boiling point	134 to 135 °C (273 to 275 °F; 407 to 408 K) at 2.0 kPa
log P	6.375
- Except where otherwise noted, data are given for materials in their standard state (at 25 °C [77 °F], 100 kPa). verify (what is ?) Infobox references

Zingiberene is a monocyclic sesquiterpene that is the predominant constituent of the oil of ginger (Zingiber officinale), from which it gets its name. It can contribute up to 30% of the essential oils in ginger rhizomes. This is the compound that gives ginger its distinct flavoring.

== Biosynthesis ==
Pathway proposed for the biosynthesis of zingiberene

Zingiberene is formed in the isoprenoid pathway from farnesyl pyrophosphate (FPP). FPP undergoes a rearrangement to give nerolidyl diphosphate. After the removal of pyrophosphate, the ring closes leaving a carbocation on the tertiary carbon attached to the ring. A 1,3-hydride shift then takes place to give a more stable allylic carbocation. The final step in the formation of zingiberene is the removal of the cyclic allylic proton and consequent formation of a double bond. Zingiberene synthase is the enzyme responsible for catalyzing the reaction forming zingiberene as well as other mono- and sesquiterpenes.

== See also ==
- Gingerol
- β-sesquiphellandrene
