= Epi-isozizaene synthase =

Class of enzymes

epi-isozizaene synthase

Identifiers
- EC no.: 4.2.3.37

Databases
- IntEnz: IntEnz view
- BRENDA: BRENDA entry
- ExPASy: NiceZyme view
- KEGG: KEGG entry
- MetaCyc: metabolic pathway
- PRIAM: profile
- PDB structures: RCSB PDB PDBe PDBsum
Search
- PMC: articles
- PubMed: articles
- NCBI: proteins

epi-Isozizaene synthase (EC 4.2.3.37, SCO5222 protein) is an enzyme with systematic name (2E,6E)-farnesyl-diphosphate diphosphate-lyase ((+)-epi-isozizaene-forming). This enzyme catalyses the following chemical reaction

(2E,6E)-farnesyl diphosphate $\rightleftharpoons$ (+)-epi-isozizaene + diphosphate

This enzyme requires Mg^{2+} for activity.
