= 7-epi-alpha-selinene synthase =

Enzyme

7-epi-α-selinene synthase

Identifiers
- EC no.: 4.2.3.86

Databases
- IntEnz: IntEnz view
- BRENDA: BRENDA entry
- ExPASy: NiceZyme view
- KEGG: KEGG entry
- MetaCyc: metabolic pathway
- PRIAM: profile
- PDB structures: RCSB PDB PDBe PDBsum
Search
- PMC: articles
- PubMed: articles
- NCBI: proteins

7-epi-α-Selinene synthase (EC 4.2.3.86) is an enzyme with systematic name (2E,6E)-farnesyl-diphosphate diphosphate-lyase (7-epi-α-selinene-forming). This enzyme catalyses the following chemical reaction

(2E,6E)-farnesyl diphosphate $\rightleftharpoons$ 7-epi-α-selinene + diphosphate

The recombinant enzyme from Vitis vinifera forms (+)-valencene and (−)-7-epi-α-selinene.
