= (S)-beta-bisabolene synthase =

Class of enzymes

(S)-β-bisabolene synthase

Identifiers
- EC no.: 4.2.3.55

Databases
- IntEnz: IntEnz view
- BRENDA: BRENDA entry
- ExPASy: NiceZyme view
- KEGG: KEGG entry
- MetaCyc: metabolic pathway
- PRIAM: profile
- PDB structures: RCSB PDB PDBe PDBsum
Search
- PMC: articles
- PubMed: articles
- NCBI: proteins

(S)-β-bisabolene synthase (EC 4.2.3.55) is an enzyme with systematic name (2E,6E)-farnesyl-diphosphate diphosphate-lyase ((S)-β-bisabolene-forming). This enzyme catalyses the following chemical reaction

(2E,6E)-farnesyl diphosphate $\rightleftharpoons$ (S)-β-bisabolene + diphosphate

The synthesis of (S)-β-macrocarpene from (2E,6E)-farnesyl diphosphate proceeds in two steps.
