= Isocomene =

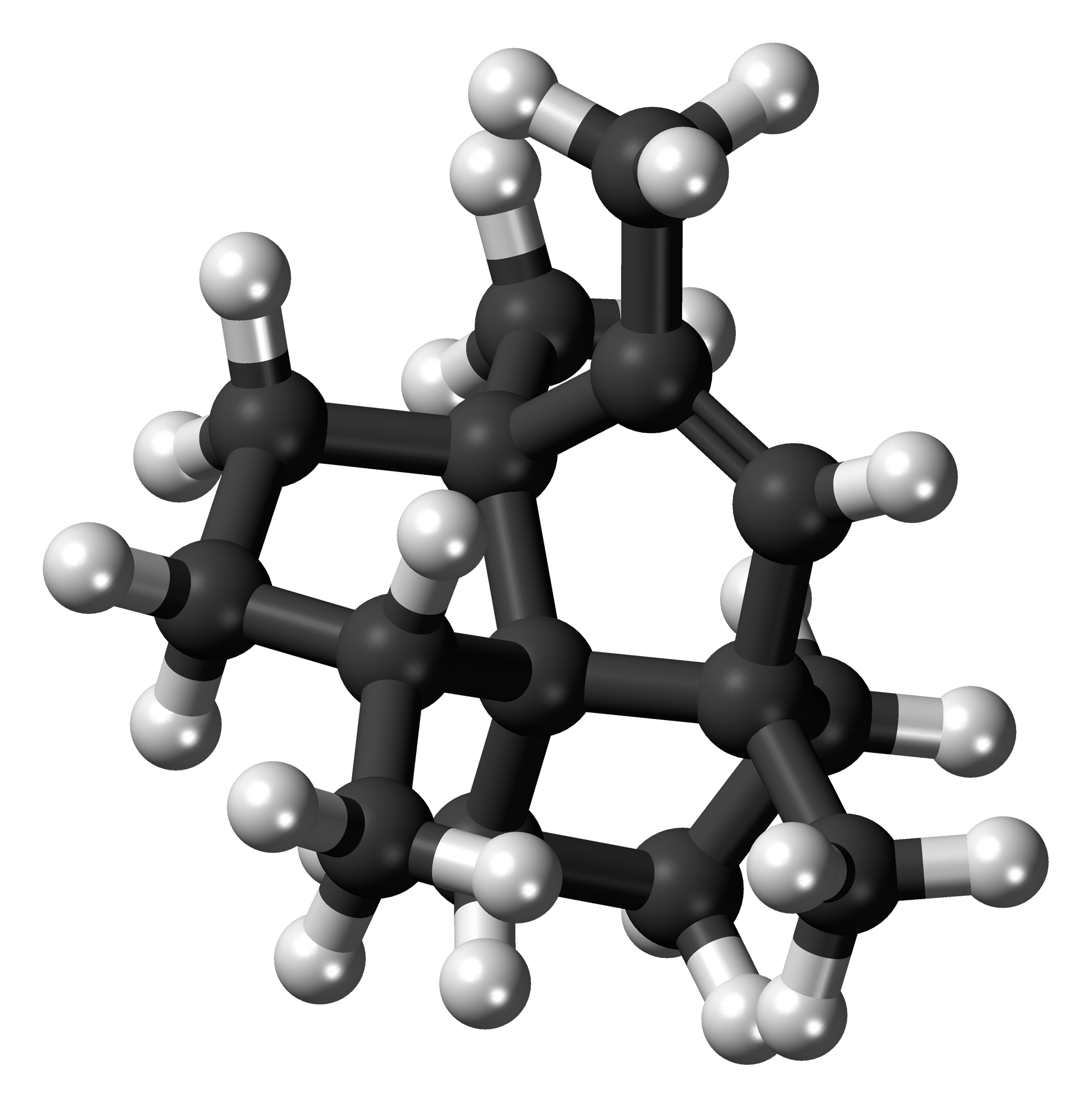

Names
- IUPAC name (3aS,5aS,8aR)-1,3a,4,5a-Tetramethyl-1,2,3,3a,5a,6,7,8-octahydrocyclopenta[c]pentalene

Identifiers
CAS Number	71629-00-0
3D model (JSmol)	Interactive image; Interactive image
ChemSpider	24600167
PubChem CID	188113
UNII	UF2Y987D5F
CompTox Dashboard (EPA)	DTXSID50992204
- InChI: InChI=1S/C15H24/c1-11-6-9-14(4)12(2)10-13(3)7-5-8-15(11,13)14/h10-11H,5-9H2,1-4H3/t11-,13+,14+,15-/m1/s1 Key: SAOJPWFHRMUCFN-UQOMUDLDSA-N; InChI=1/C15H24/c1-11-6-9-14(4)12(2)10-13(3)7-5-8-15(11,13)14/h10-11H,5-9H2,1-4H3/t11-,13+,14+,15-/m1/s1 Key: SAOJPWFHRMUCFN-UQOMUDLDBQ
- SMILES: CC1=C[C@]3(C)CCC[C@@]32[C@H](C)CC[C@@]12C; C[C@@H]1CC[C@@]2([C@]13CCC[C@]3(C=C2C)C)C

Properties
Chemical formula	C_{15}H_{24}
Molar mass	204.357 g·mol^{−1}
- Except where otherwise noted, data are given for materials in their standard state (at 25 °C [77 °F], 100 kPa). verify (what is ?) Infobox references

Isocomene is a sesquiterpene first isolated from the perennial herb southern goldenbush (Isocoma wrightii), from which it derives its name. Its unusual structure consisting of three fused cyclopentane rings was first described by Zalkow et al. in 1977. The first total synthesis of isocomene was published by M.C. Pirrung in 1979. The key steps are a photocatalyzed intramolecular [2 + 2] cycloaddition reaction followed by a rearrangement reaction which forms three contiguous chiral centers.
