= Valerena-4,7(11)-diene synthase =

Class of enzymes

Identifiers
- EC no.: 4.2.3.139

Databases
- IntEnz: IntEnz view
- BRENDA: BRENDA entry
- ExPASy: NiceZyme view
- KEGG: KEGG entry
- MetaCyc: metabolic pathway
- PRIAM: profile
- PDB structures: RCSB PDB PDBe PDBsum
Search
- PMC: articles
- PubMed: articles
- NCBI: proteins

Valerena-4,7(11)-diene synthase (EC 4.2.3.139, VoTPS2) is an enzyme with systematic name (2E,6E)-farnesyl-diphosphate diphosphate-lyase (cyclizing, valerena-4,7(11)-diene-forming). This enzyme catalyses the following chemical reaction

(2E,6E)-farnesyl diphosphate $\rightleftharpoons$ valerena-4,7(11)-diene + diphosphate

This enzyme is isolated from the plant Valeriana officinalis (valerian).
