= 7-epi-sesquithujene synthase =

Class of enzymes

Identifiers
- EC no.: 4.2.3.101

Databases
- IntEnz: IntEnz view
- BRENDA: BRENDA entry
- ExPASy: NiceZyme view
- KEGG: KEGG entry
- MetaCyc: metabolic pathway
- PRIAM: profile
- PDB structures: RCSB PDB PDBe PDBsum
Search
- PMC: articles
- PubMed: articles
- NCBI: proteins

7-epi-Sesquithujene synthase (EC 4.2.3.101, TPS4-B73) is an enzyme with systematic name (2E,6E)-farnesyl-diphosphate diphosphate-lyase (7-epi-sesquithujene-forming). This enzyme catalyses the following chemical reaction

(2E,6E)-farnesyl diphosphate $\rightleftharpoons$ 7-epi-sesquithujene + diphosphate

The enzyme from Zea mays, variety B73, gives mainly 7-epi-sesquithujene.
