= Valencene =

Names
- IUPAC name 4α,5α-Eremophila-1(10),11-diene
- Systematic IUPAC name (3R,4aS,5R)-4a,5-Dimethyl-3-(prop-1-en-2-yl)-1,2,3,4,4a,5,6,7-octahydronaphthalene

Identifiers
CAS Number	4630-07-3
3D model (JSmol)	Interactive image
ChEBI	CHEBI:61700
ChemSpider	8031495
ECHA InfoCard	100.022.770
PubChem CID	9855795
UNII	96H21P91IG
CompTox Dashboard (EPA)	DTXSID8047052
- InChI: InChI=1S/C15H24/c1-11(2)13-8-9-14-7-5-6-12(3)15(14,4)10-13/h7,12-13H,1,5-6,8-10H2,2-4H3/t12-,13-,15+/m1/s1 Key: QEBNYNLSCGVZOH-NFAWXSAZSA-N; InChI=1/C15H24/c1-11(2)13-8-9-14-7-5-6-12(3)15(14,4)10-13/h7,12-13H,1,5-6,8-10H2,2-4H3/t12-,13-,15+/m1/s1 Key: QEBNYNLSCGVZOH-NFAWXSAZBT
- SMILES: C\12=C\CC[C@H]([C@@]/1(C[C@H](\C(=C)C)CC2)C)C

Properties
Chemical formula	C_{15}H_{24}
Molar mass	204.357 g·mol^{−1}
Appearance	colorless oil
Boiling point	123 °C (253 °F; 396 K) at 11 mmHg
Solubility in water	organic solvents
- Except where otherwise noted, data are given for materials in their standard state (at 25 °C [77 °F], 100 kPa). verify (what is ?) Infobox references

Valencene is a sesquiterpene that is an aroma component of citrus fruit and citrus-derived odorants. It is obtained inexpensively from Valencia oranges. Valencene is biosynthesized from farnesyl pyrophosphate (FPP) by the CVS enzyme.

It is used as a precursor to nootkatone, the main contributor to the aroma and flavor of grapefruit.
