= (+)-epi-alpha-bisabolol synthase =

Class of enzymes

(+)-epi-α-bisabolol synthase

Identifiers
- EC no.: 4.2.3.138

Databases
- IntEnz: IntEnz view
- BRENDA: BRENDA entry
- ExPASy: NiceZyme view
- KEGG: KEGG entry
- MetaCyc: metabolic pathway
- PRIAM: profile
- PDB structures: RCSB PDB PDBe PDBsum
Search
- PMC: articles
- PubMed: articles
- NCBI: proteins

(+)-epi-α-Bisabolol synthase (EC 4.2.3.138) is an enzyme with systematic name (2E,6E)-farnesyl-diphosphate diphosphate-lyase (cyclizing, (+)-epi-α-bisabolol-forming). This enzyme catalyses the following chemical reaction:

(2E,6E)-farnesyl diphosphate + H_{2}O $\rightleftharpoons$ (+)-epi-α-bisabolol + diphosphate

This enzyme is isolated from the plant Phyla dulcis (Aztec sweet herb).
