= (+)-delta-selinene synthase =

Class of enzymes

(+)-δ-selinene synthase

Identifiers
- EC no.: 4.2.3.76

Databases
- IntEnz: IntEnz view
- BRENDA: BRENDA entry
- ExPASy: NiceZyme view
- KEGG: KEGG entry
- MetaCyc: metabolic pathway
- PRIAM: profile
- PDB structures: RCSB PDB PDBe PDBsum
Search
- PMC: articles
- PubMed: articles
- NCBI: proteins

(+)-δ-Selinene synthase (EC 4.2.3.76) is an enzyme with systematic name (2E,6E)-farnesyl-diphosphate diphosphate-lyase ((+)-δ-selinene-forming). This enzyme catalyses the following chemical reaction

(2E,6E)-farnesyl diphosphate $\rightleftharpoons$ (+)-δ-selinene + diphosphate

Initial cyclization gives germacrene C in an enzyme bound form.
