= (E)-2-epi-beta-caryophyllene synthase =

Class of enzymes

(E)-2-epi-β-caryophyllene synthase

Identifiers
- EC no.: 4.2.3.137

Databases
- IntEnz: IntEnz view
- BRENDA: BRENDA entry
- ExPASy: NiceZyme view
- KEGG: KEGG entry
- MetaCyc: metabolic pathway
- PRIAM: profile
- PDB structures: RCSB PDB PDBe PDBsum
Search
- PMC: articles
- PubMed: articles
- NCBI: proteins

(E)-2-epi-β-Caryophyllene synthase (EC 4.2.3.137, (E)-2-epi-β-caryophyllene synthase, SmMTPSL26) is an enzyme with systematic name (2E,6E)-farnesyl-diphosphate diphosphate-lyase (cyclizing, (E)-2-epi-β-caryophyllene-forming). This enzyme catalyses the following chemical reaction

(2E,6E)-farnesyl diphosphate $\rightleftharpoons$ (E)-2-epi-β-caryophyllene + diphosphate

This enzyme is isolated from the plant Selaginella moellendorffii.
