= (−)-germacrene D synthase =

Class of enzymes

Identifiers
- EC no.: 4.2.3.75

Databases
- IntEnz: IntEnz view
- BRENDA: BRENDA entry
- ExPASy: NiceZyme view
- KEGG: KEGG entry
- MetaCyc: metabolic pathway
- PRIAM: profile
- PDB structures: RCSB PDB PDBe PDBsum
Search
- PMC: articles
- PubMed: articles
- NCBI: proteins

(−)-Germacrene D synthase (EC 4.2.3.75) is an enzyme with systematic name (2E,6E)-farnesyl-diphosphate diphosphate-lyase ((−)-germacrene-D-forming). This enzyme catalyses the following chemical reaction

(2E,6E)-farnesyl diphosphate $\rightleftharpoons$ (−)-germacrene D + diphosphate

In Solidago canadensis the biosynthesis results in the pro-R hydrogen at C-1 of the farnesyl diphosphate ending up at C-11 of the (−)-germacrene D .
