= Alpha-longipinene synthase =

α-longipinene synthase

Identifiers
- EC no.: 4.2.3.80

Databases
- IntEnz: IntEnz view
- BRENDA: BRENDA entry
- ExPASy: NiceZyme view
- KEGG: KEGG entry
- MetaCyc: metabolic pathway
- PRIAM: profile
- PDB structures: RCSB PDB PDBe PDBsum
Search
- PMC: articles
- PubMed: articles
- NCBI: proteins

α-Longipinene synthase (EC 4.2.3.80) is an enzyme with systematic name (2E,6E)-farnesyl-diphosphate diphosphate-lyase (α-longipinene-forming). This enzyme catalyses the following chemical reaction

(2E,6E)-farnesyl diphosphate $\rightleftharpoons$ α-longipinene + diphosphate

The enzyme from Norway spruce produces longifolene as the main product.
