= Grapefruit mercaptan =

Grapefruit mercaptan
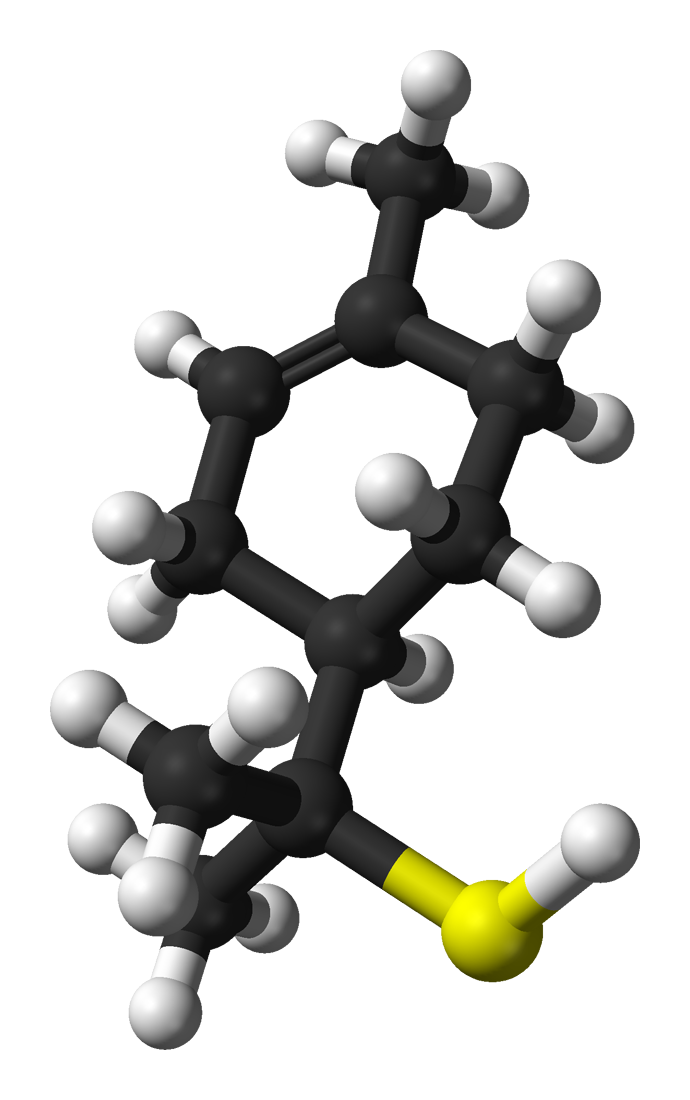
Grapefruit mercaptan

Names
- Preferred IUPAC name 2-[(1R)-4-Methylcyclohex-3-en-1-yl]propane-2-thiol
- Other names grapefruit mercaptan 1-p-menthene-8-thiol α,α,4-trimethylcyclohex-3-ene-1-methane thiol thioterpineol

Identifiers
CAS Number	71159-90-5 (racemate); 83150-78-1 (R enantiomer)
3D model (JSmol)	Interactive image
ChemSpider	21163535
ECHA InfoCard	100.072.886
EC Number	275-223-1
PubChem CID	6427135
UNII	7AT54D0N8R
CompTox Dashboard (EPA)	DTXSID00894921
- InChI: InChI=1S/C10H18S/c1-8-4-6-9(7-5-8)10(2,3)11/h4,9,11H,5-7H2,1-3H3/t9-/m0/s1 Key: ZQPCOAKGRYBBMR-VIFPVBQESA-N; InChI=1/C10H18S/c1-8-4-6-9(7-5-8)10(2,3)11/h4,9,11H,5-7H2,1-3H3/t9-/m0/s1 Key: ZQPCOAKGRYBBMR-VIFPVBQEBF
- SMILES: SC(C)(C)[C@@H]1CCC(C)=CC1

Properties
Chemical formula	C_{10}H_{18}S
Molar mass	170.31 g/mol
Density	1.03 g/cm^{3}
Melting point	< 25 °C (77 °F; 298 K)
Boiling point	58 °C (136 °F; 331 K) at .33 mmHg

Hazards
- GHS labelling
Pictograms	(GHS07: Exclamation mark)
Signal word	Warning
Hazard statements	H302, H315, H319
Precautionary statements	P264, P270, P280, P301+P312, P302+P352, P305+P351+P338, P321, P330, P332+P313, P337+P313, P362, P501
- Except where otherwise noted, data are given for materials in their standard state (at 25 °C [77 °F], 100 kPa). verify (what is ?) Infobox references

Grapefruit mercaptan is a natural organic compound found in grapefruit. It is a monoterpenoid that contains a thiol (also known as a mercaptan) functional group. Structurally, a hydroxy group of terpineol is replaced by the thiol in grapefruit mercaptan, so it is also called thioterpineol. Volatile thiols typically have very strong, often unpleasant odors that can be detected by humans in very low concentrations. Grapefruit mercaptan has a very potent, but not unpleasant, odor, and it is the chemical constituent primarily responsible for the aroma of grapefruit. This characteristic aroma is a property of only the R enantiomer. The aroma of the racemate is described as "sulfurous, aromatic, grapefruit".

Pure grapefruit mercaptan, or citrus-derived oils rich in grapefruit mercaptan, are sometimes used in perfumery and the flavor industry to impart citrus aromas and flavors. However, both industries actively seek substitutes for grapefruit mercaptans for use as a grapefruit flavorant, since its decomposition products are often highly disagreeable to the human sense of smell. The detection threshold for the (+)-(R) enantiomer of grapefruit mercaptan is 3.4×10^{−5} ppb, or equivalently a concentration of 0.000034 nanograms per litre of air. This is the lowest detection thresholds recorded.

== See also ==
- Nootkatone, another aroma compound in grapefruit
- Terpineol, where a hydroxyl is in place of the thiol
