= Selinene =

Selinenes
α-Selinene
β-Selinene
γ-Selinene
δ-Selinene

Names
- IUPAC names α: Eudesma-3,11-diene β: Eudesma-4(14),11-diene γ: Eudesma-4(14),7(11)-diene δ: Eudesma-4,6-diene
- Systematic IUPAC name α: (2R,4aR,8aR)-2-Isopropenyl-4a,8-dimethyl-1,2,3,4,4a,5,6,8a-octahydronaphthalene β: (4aR,7R,8aS)-7-Isopropenyl-4a-methyl-1-methylenedecahydronaphthalene γ: (4aR,8aS)-7-Isopropylidene-4a-methyl-1-methylenedecahydronaphthalene δ: (3R,4aS,5R,8aS)-3-Isopropyl-5,8a-dimethyl-1,2,3,4,4a,5,6,8a-octahydronaphthalene
- Other names Selina-3,11-diene (α); beta-Eudesmene (β)

Identifiers
CAS Number	473-13-2 (α); 17066-67-0 (β); 515-17-3 (γ); 473-14-3 (δ)
3D model (JSmol)	(α): Interactive image; (β): Interactive image; (γ): Interactive image; (δ): Interactive image
ChemSpider	9031905 (α); 390838 (β); 8831174 (γ); 23254820 (δ)
PubChem CID	10856614 (α); 442393 (β); 10655819 (γ)
UNII	99ZHA8F274 (α)
- InChI: (α): InChI=1/C15H24/c1-11(2)13-7-9-15(4)8-5-6-12(3)14(15)10-13/h6,13-14H,1,5,7-10H2,2-4H3/t13-,14+,15-/m1/s1 Key: OZQAPQSEYFAMCY-QLFBSQMIBC; (β): InChI=1/C15H24/c1-11(2)13-7-9-15(4)8-5-6-12(3)14(15)10-13/h13-14H,1,3,5-10H2,2,4H3/t13-,14+,15-/m1/s1 Key: YOVSPTNQHMDJAG-QLFBSQMIBC; (γ): InChI=1/C15H24/c1-11(2)13-7-9-15(4)8-5-6-12(3)14(15)10-13/h14H,3,5-10H2,1-2,4H3/t14-,15+/m0/s1 Key: RMZHSBMIZBMVMN-LSDHHAIUBU; (δ): InChI=1/C15H26/c1-11(2)13-7-9-15(4)8-5-6-12(3)14(15)10-13/h5,8,11-14H,6-7,9-10H2,1-4H3/t12-,13-,14+,15-/m1/s1 Key: LISVWFDKWZILCJ-APIJFGDWBH
- SMILES: (α): C\1(=C\CC[C@]2([C@H]/1C[C@H](\C(=C)C)CC2)C)C; (β): C1(=C)\CCC[C@]2([C@H]1C[C@H](\C(=C)C)CC2)C; (γ): C2(=C(/C)C)\CC[C@@]1([C@H](/C(=C)CCC1)C2)C; (δ): C[C@@H]1CC=C[C@]2([C@H]1C[C@@H](CC2)C(C)C)C

Properties
Chemical formula	C_{15}H_{24}
Molar mass	204.357 g·mol^{−1}
Density	α: 0.914 g/cm^{3} (20 °C) β: 0.915 g/cm^{3} (20 °C)
- Except where otherwise noted, data are given for materials in their standard state (at 25 °C [77 °F], 100 kPa). Infobox references

Selinenes are a group of closely related isomeric chemical compounds that are classified as sesquiterpenes. The four selinenes have the formula C_{15}H_{24}. Selinenes have been isolated from a variety of plant sources. α-Selinene and β-selinene are the most common and are two of the principal components of the oil from celery seeds. Celery seed oil consists of a 60% and 20% of limonene and selinene, respectively.
