= Alpha-gurjunene synthase =

α-gurjunene synthase

Identifiers
- EC no.: 4.2.3.72

Databases
- IntEnz: IntEnz view
- BRENDA: BRENDA entry
- ExPASy: NiceZyme view
- KEGG: KEGG entry
- MetaCyc: metabolic pathway
- PRIAM: profile
- PDB structures: RCSB PDB PDBe PDBsum
Search
- PMC: articles
- PubMed: articles
- NCBI: proteins

α-Gurjunene synthase (EC 4.2.3.72) is an enzyme with systematic name (2E,6E)-farnesyl-diphosphate diphosphate-lyase ((–)-α-gurjunene-forming). This enzyme catalyses the following chemical reaction

(2E,6E)-farnesyl diphosphate $\rightleftharpoons$ (–)-α-gurjunene + diphosphate

Initial cyclization probably gives bicyclogermacrene in an enzyme-bound form.
