= Cubebene =

Cubebenes
α-Cubebene
β-Cubebene

Names
- IUPAC name: (α): (1R,5S,6R,7S,10R)-4,10-Dimethyl-7-propan-2-yltricyclo[4.4.0.0^{1,5}]dec-3-ene; (β): (1R,5S,6R,7S,10R)-10-Methyl-4-methylidene-7-propan-2-yltricyclo[4.4.0.0^{1,5}]decane

Identifiers
CAS Number	(α): 17699-14-8; (β): 13744-15-5
3D model (JSmol)	(α): Interactive image; (β): Interactive image
ChEBI	(β): CHEBI:10363
ChemSpider	(α): 24846711; (β): 84031
EC Number	(α): 605-792-7; (β): 604-019-0
KEGG	(α): C09647; (β): C09648
PubChem CID	(α): 42608159; (β): 93081
UNII	(α): 438H9S5RG9
- InChI: (α): InChI=1S/C15H24/c1-9(2)12-6-5-11(4)15-8-7-10(3)13(15)14(12)15/h7,9,11-14H,5-6,8H2,1-4H3/t11-,12+,13-,14-,15?/m1/s1 Key: XUEHVOLRMXNRKQ-PFNKYVCDSA-N
- SMILES: (α): C[C@@H]1CC[C@H]([C@H]2C13[C@@H]2C(=CC3)C)C(C)C; (β): C[C@@H]1CC[C@H]([C@H]2[C@]13[C@@H]2C(=C)CC3)C(C)C

Properties
Chemical formula	C_{15}H_{24}
Molar mass	204.357 g·mol^{−1}
- Except where otherwise noted, data are given for materials in their standard state (at 25 °C [77 °F], 100 kPa). Infobox references

Cubebenes are a pair of chemical compounds, classified as sesquiterpenes, first isolated from Piper cubeba berries, known as cubebs.

The volatile oil from the distillation of cubebs is a pale green or blue-yellow viscous liquid with a warm woody, slightly camphoraceous odor which is mostly cubebene which comes in two forms, α- and β-cubebene, both with the molecular formula C_{15}H_{24}. They differ only in the position of a double bond which is endocyclic (part of the five-membered ring) in α-cubebene, but exocyclic in the β isomer.

== Additional plant sources ==
A 2022 study detected α-cubebene in samples of oleoresin from three pine species (Pinus elliottii, Pinus pinaster, Pinus tropicalis) via mass spectrometry.

α-cubebene was detected in Lemberger grapes via headspace gas chromatography-mass spectrometry.
