= Beta-farnesene synthase =

Enzyme

β-farnesene synthase

Identifiers
- EC no.: 4.2.3.47

Databases
- IntEnz: IntEnz view
- BRENDA: BRENDA entry
- ExPASy: NiceZyme view
- KEGG: KEGG entry
- MetaCyc: metabolic pathway
- PRIAM: profile
- PDB structures: RCSB PDB PDBe PDBsum
Search
- PMC: articles
- PubMed: articles
- NCBI: proteins

β-Farnesene synthase (EC 4.2.3.47, farnesene synthase, terpene synthase 10, terpene synthase 10-B73, TPS10) is an enzyme with systematic name (2E,6E)-farnesyl-diphosphate diphosphate-lyase ((E)-β-farnesene-forming). This enzyme catalyses the following chemical reaction

(2E,6E)-farnesyl diphosphate $\rightleftharpoons$ (E)-β-farnesene + diphosphate
