= (+)-beta-caryophyllene synthase =

Class of enzymes

(+)-β-caryophyllene synthase

Identifiers
- EC no.: 4.2.3.89

Databases
- IntEnz: IntEnz view
- BRENDA: BRENDA entry
- ExPASy: NiceZyme view
- KEGG: KEGG entry
- MetaCyc: metabolic pathway
- PRIAM: profile
- PDB structures: RCSB PDB PDBe PDBsum
Search
- PMC: articles
- PubMed: articles
- NCBI: proteins

(+)-β-Caryophyllene synthase (EC 4.2.3.89, GcoA) is an enzyme with systematic name (2Z,6E)-farnesyl-diphosphate diphosphate-lyase (cyclizing, (+)-β-caryophyllene-forming). This enzyme catalyses the following chemical reaction:

(2E,6E)-farnesyl diphosphate $\rightleftharpoons$ (+)-β-caryophyllene + diphosphate

This enzyme also converts the (+)-β-caryophyllene to (+)-caryolan-1-ol.
