= 5-epiaristolochene synthase =

Enzyme

Identifiers
- EC no.: 4.2.3.61

Databases
- IntEnz: IntEnz view
- BRENDA: BRENDA entry
- ExPASy: NiceZyme view
- KEGG: KEGG entry
- MetaCyc: metabolic pathway
- PRIAM: profile
- PDB structures: RCSB PDB PDBe PDBsum
Search
- PMC: articles
- PubMed: articles
- NCBI: proteins

5-Epiaristolochene synthase (EC 4.2.3.61, 5-epi-aristolochene synthase, tobacco epiaristolochene synthase, farnesyl pyrophosphate cyclase, EAS, TEAS) is an enzyme with systematic name (2E,6E)-farnesyl-diphosphate diphosphate-lyase ((+)-5-epiaristolochene-forming). This enzyme catalyses the following chemical reaction

(2E,6E)-farnesyl diphosphate $\rightleftharpoons$ (+)-5-epiaristolochene + diphosphate

Initial cyclization gives (+)-germacrene A in an enzyme-bound form.
