= Thujopsene =

Names
- Preferred IUPAC name (1aS,4aS,8aS)-2,4a,8,8-Tetramethyl-1,1a,4,4a,5,6,7,8-octahydrocyclopropa[d]naphthalene
- Other names Sesquichamene; Thujopsen; Widdrene

Identifiers
CAS Number	470-40-6
3D model (JSmol)	Interactive image
ChEBI	CHEBI:9578
ChemSpider	390845
ECHA InfoCard	100.006.753
PubChem CID	442402
UNII	E116U47P7N
CompTox Dashboard (EPA)	DTXSID50881245
- InChI: InChI=1S/C15H24/c1-11-6-9-14(4)8-5-7-13(2,3)15(14)10-12(11)15/h6,12H,5,7-10H2,1-4H3/t12-,14-,15-/m0/s1 Key: WXQGPFZDVCRBME-QEJZJMRPSA-N; InChI=1/C15H24/c1-11-6-9-14(4)8-5-7-13(2,3)15(14)10-12(11)15/h6,12H,5,7-10H2,1-4H3/t12-,14-,15-/m0/s1 Key: WXQGPFZDVCRBME-QEJZJMRPBP
- SMILES: C\2=C(\[C@H]3[C@@]1([C@](CCCC1(C)C)(C)C/2)C3)C

Properties
Chemical formula	C_{15}H_{24}
Molar mass	204.357 g·mol^{−1}
Density	0.936 g/mL (20 °C)
Boiling point	258 to 260 °C (496 to 500 °F; 531 to 533 K)
- Except where otherwise noted, data are given for materials in their standard state (at 25 °C [77 °F], 100 kPa). Infobox references

Thujopsene is a natural chemical compound, classified as a sesquiterpene, with the molecular formula C_{15}H_{24}.

Thujopsene is found in the essential oil of a variety of conifers, in particular Juniperus cedrus and Thujopsis dolabrata in which it comprises around 2.2% of the weight of the heartwood.

== Biosynthesis ==
Thujopsene is biosynthesized from farnesyl pyrophosphate (FPP):

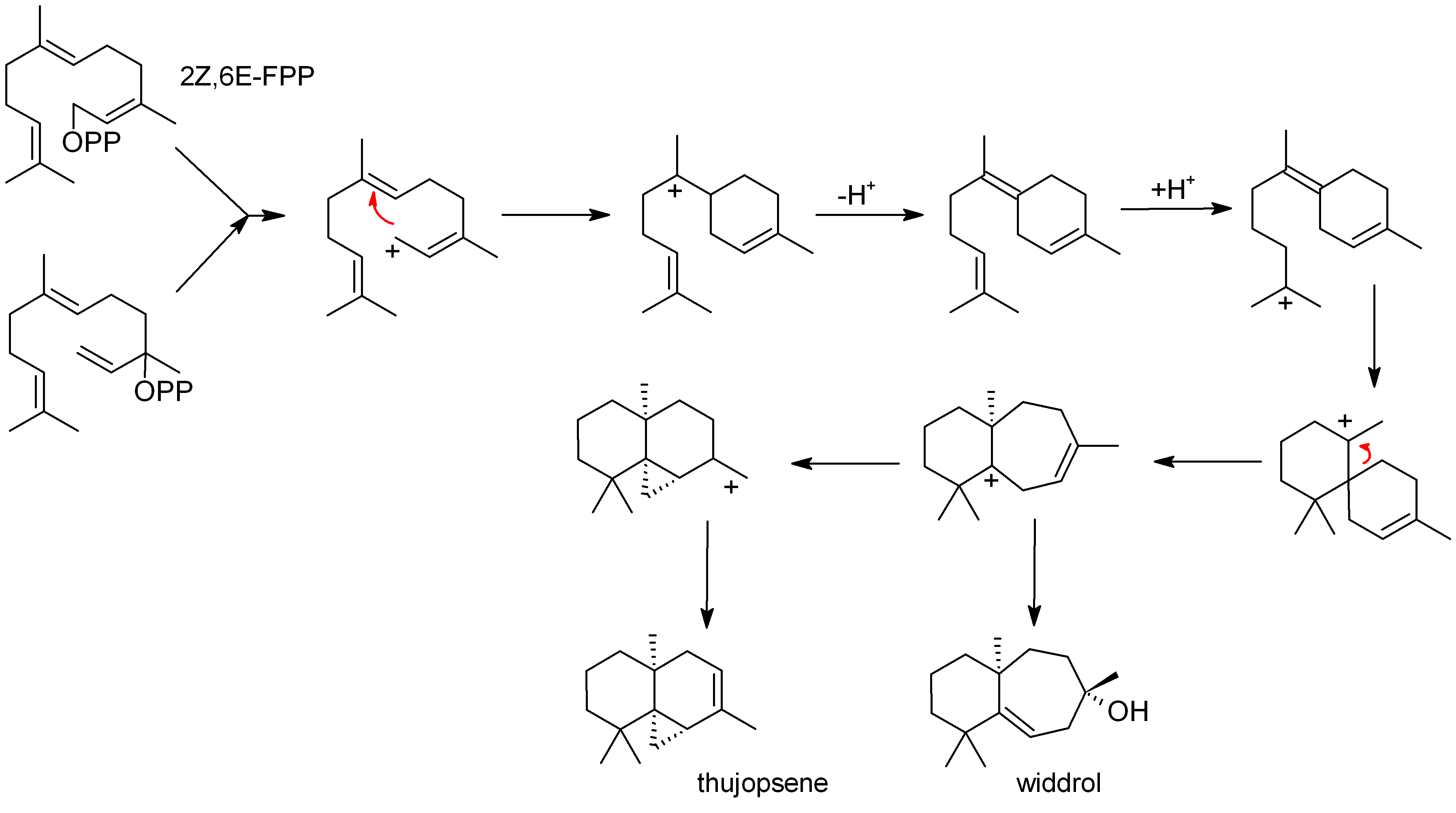
