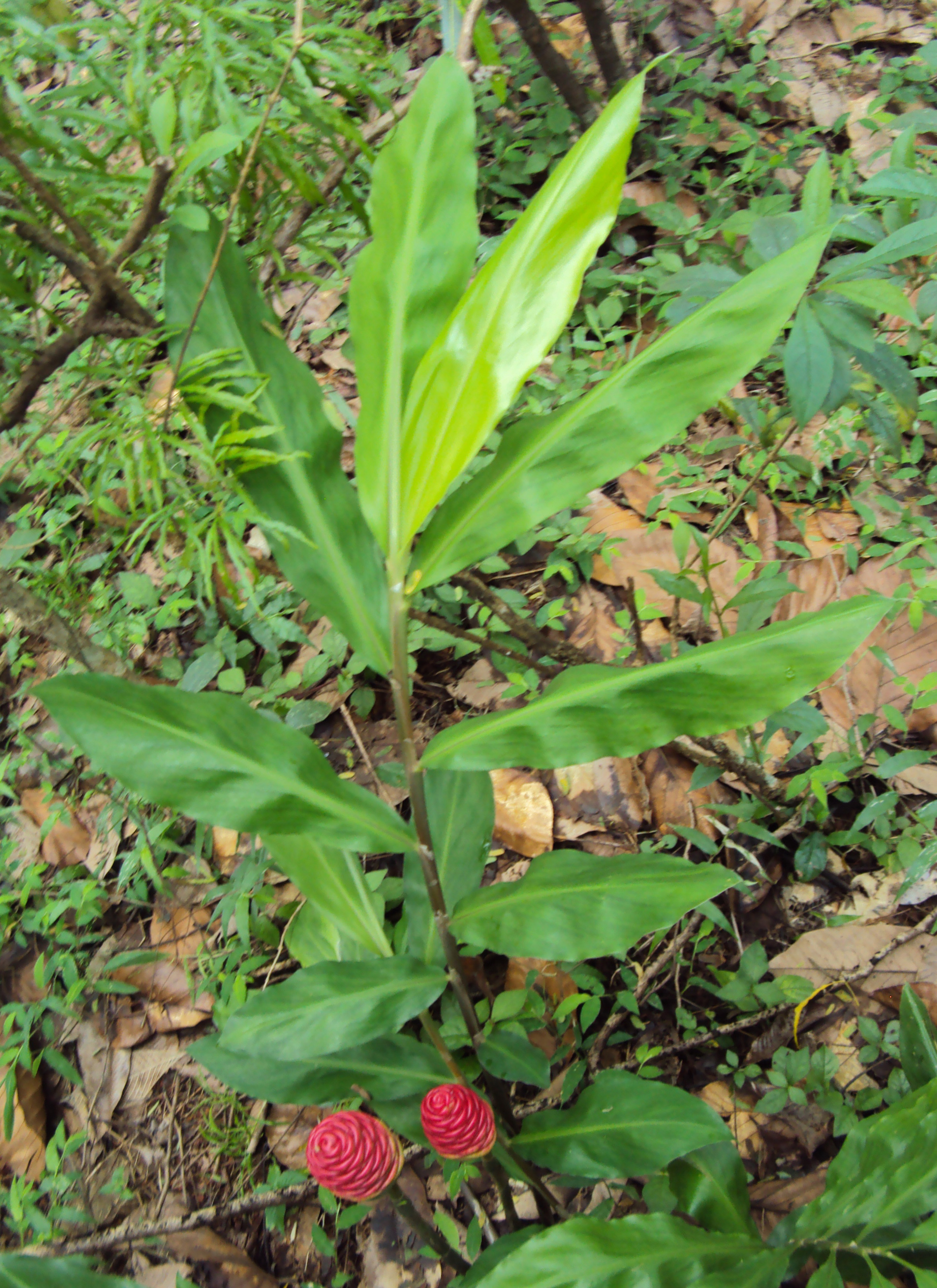

Conservation status
- Data Deficient (IUCN 3.1)

Scientific classification
- Kingdom: Plantae
- Clade: Tracheophytes
- Clade: Angiosperms
- Clade: Monocots
- Clade: Commelinids
- Order: Zingiberales
- Family: Zingiberaceae
- Genus: Zingiber
- Species: Z. zerumbet

Binomial name
- Zingiber zerumbet (L.) Roscoe ex Sm.

Synonyms
- Amomum silvestre Poir.; Amomum spurium (J.Koenig) J.F.Gmel.; Amomum sylvestre Lam. [Illegitimate]; Amomum zerumbet L.; Cardamomum spurium (J.Koenig) Kuntze; Dieterichia lampujang Giseke; Dieterichia lampuyang Giseke; Dieterichia major Raeusch.; Dieterichia minor Raeusch.; Dieterichia spuria (J.Koenig) Giseke; Zerumbet zingiber T.Lestib.; Zingiber amaricans Blume; Zingiber aromaticum Valeton; Zingiber blancoi Hassk.; Zingiber darceyi H.J.Veitch; Zingiber littorale (Valeton) Valeton; Zingiber ovoideum Blume; Zingiber spurium J.Koenig; Zingiber sylvestre Garsault [Invalid]; Zingiber truncatum Stokes; Zingiber zerumbet var. littoralis Valeton; Zingiber zerumbet var. magnum Elmer; Zingiber zerumbet subsp. Zerumbet

= Zingiber zerumbet =

Species of flowering plant

Zingiber zerumbet is a species of plant in the ginger family with leafy stems growing to about 1.2 m (4 ft) tall. It originates from Asia, but can be found in many tropical countries. Common names include: awapuhi (from Hawaiian: ʻawapuhi spelled with an ʻokina, doublet of ʻawa), bitter ginger, shampoo ginger, lempoyang (from Malay) and pinecone ginger.

The rhizomes of Z. zerumbet are used as food flavoring and appetizers in various cuisines, and the rhizome extracts have been used in herbal medicine.

== Description ==
Zingiber zerumbet is a perennial. From autumn until spring it goes dormant above ground as the leafy stems shrivel and die away, leaving the pale brown, creeping stems (rhizomes) at ground level. In the spring, the plant springs up anew. The 10–12 blade-shaped leaves are 15–20 centimetres (6–8 in) long and grow in an alternate arrangement on a thin, upright stem to 1.2 m (4 ft) tall. Among the leafy stems, the conical or club-shaped flower heads burst forth on separate and shorter stalks. These appear in the summer, after the leafy stems have been growing for a while.

The flower heads are initially green and are 3 to 10 cm (1 1/4 to 4 in) long with overlapping scales, enclosing small yellowish-white flowers that poke out a few at a time. As the flower heads mature, they gradually fill with an aromatic, slimy liquid and turn a brighter red color. The flower stalks usually remain hidden beneath the leaf stalks.

== Distribution and history ==
Z. zerumbet is native to tropical Asia and Australasia. The subspecies Z. zerumbet subsp. cochinchinense (Gagnep.) Triboun & K.Larsen (previously Z. cochinchinense) is found in Vietnam.

Remains of Z. zerumbet have been identified at the Kuk Swamp archaeological site of New Guinea at the Phase 1 layers, dated to 10,220 to 9,910 BP. However, whether it was cultivated or merely exploited from the wild is unknown. Like the ginger, the earliest evidence of its cultivation is from the Austronesian peoples who carried it with them during the Austronesian expansion (c. 5,000 BP) as canoe plants, reaching as far as Remote Oceania.

== Traditional uses ==
The leaves and leaf stalks, which are also fragrant, were used in baking in the imu, underground oven, to enhance the flavor of pork and fish as they cooked. Traditionally, the aromatic underground rhizomes were sliced, dried, and pounded to a powder, then added to the folds of stored kapa cloth.

Perhaps the most common use of the plant awapuhi is as a shampoo and conditioner. The clear fragrant juice present in the mature flower heads that resemble red pine cones is used for softening and bringing shininess to the hair. It can be left in the hair or rinsed out and can also be used as a massage lubricant.

== In popular culture ==
A video demonstrating the extraction of the shampoo from the plant brought Mitchell Burns to virality.

== Gallery ==
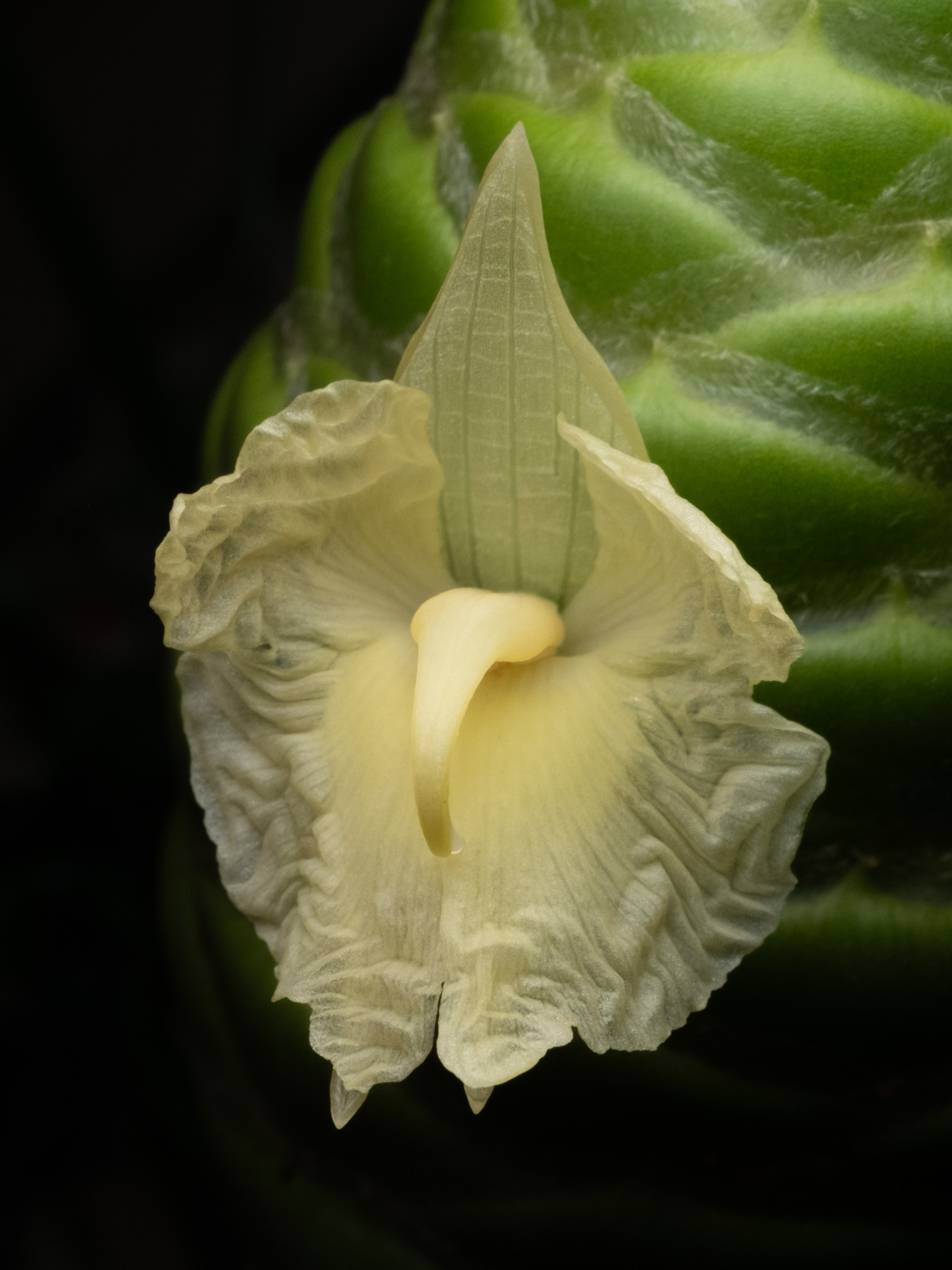

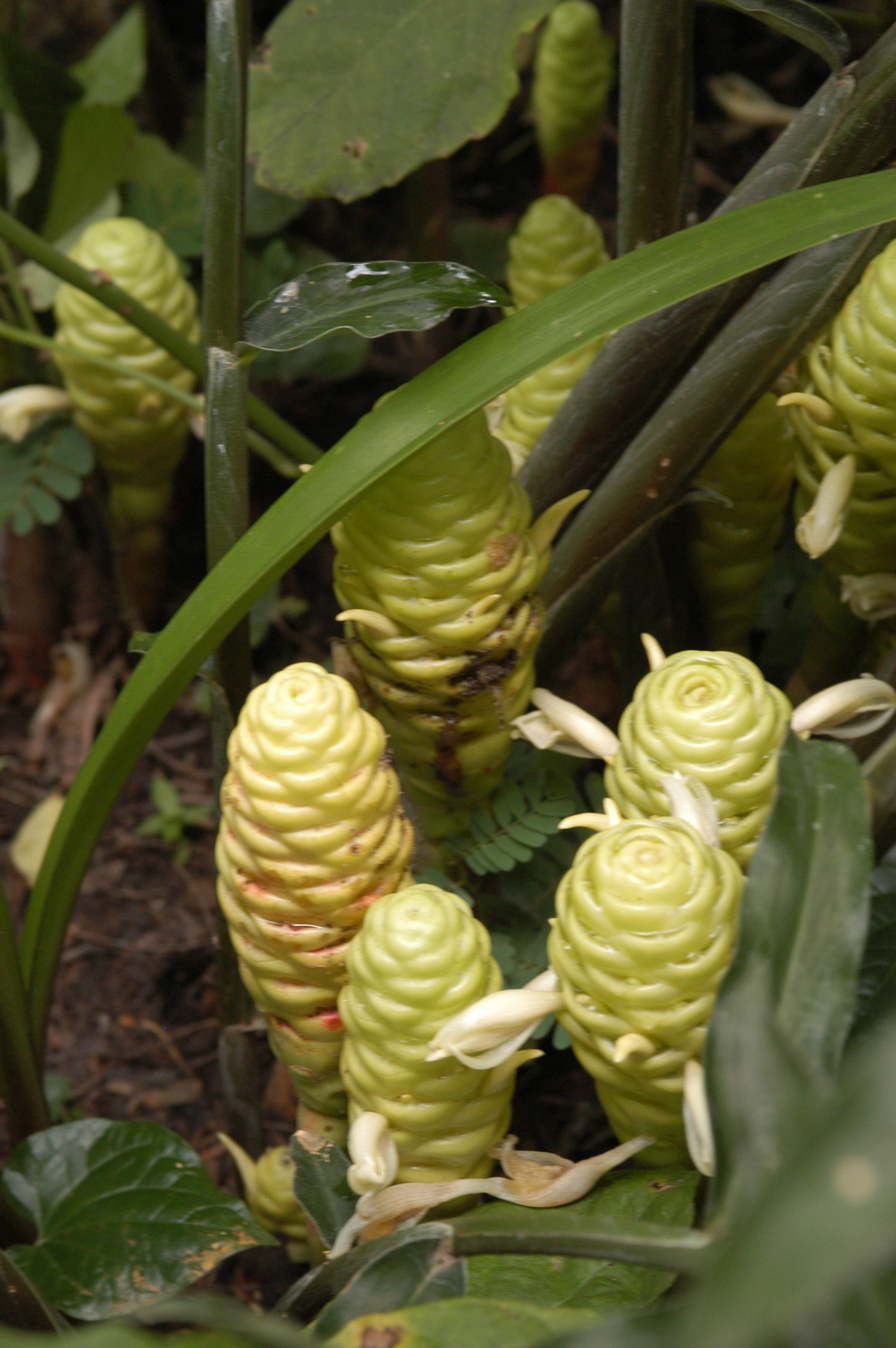

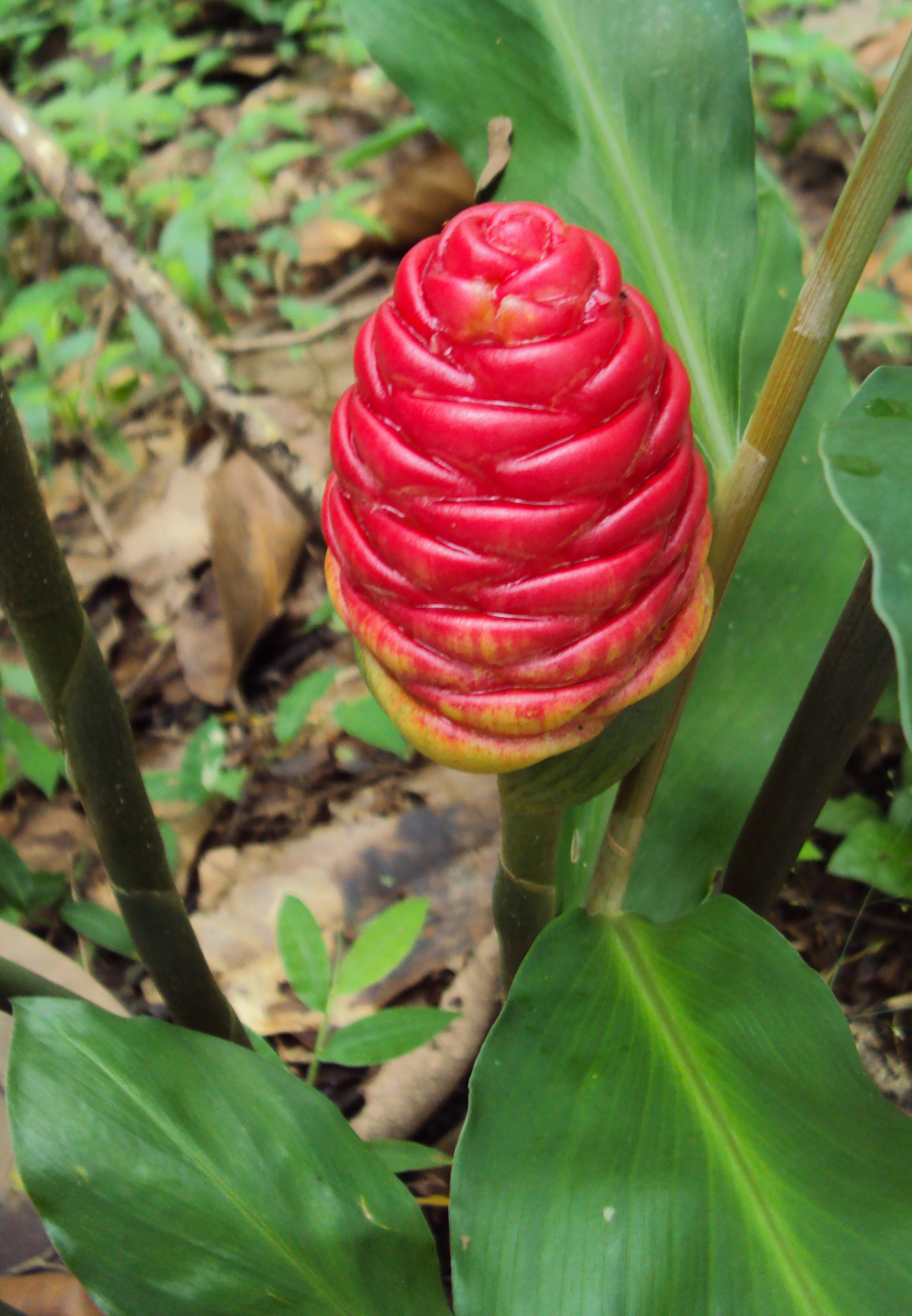

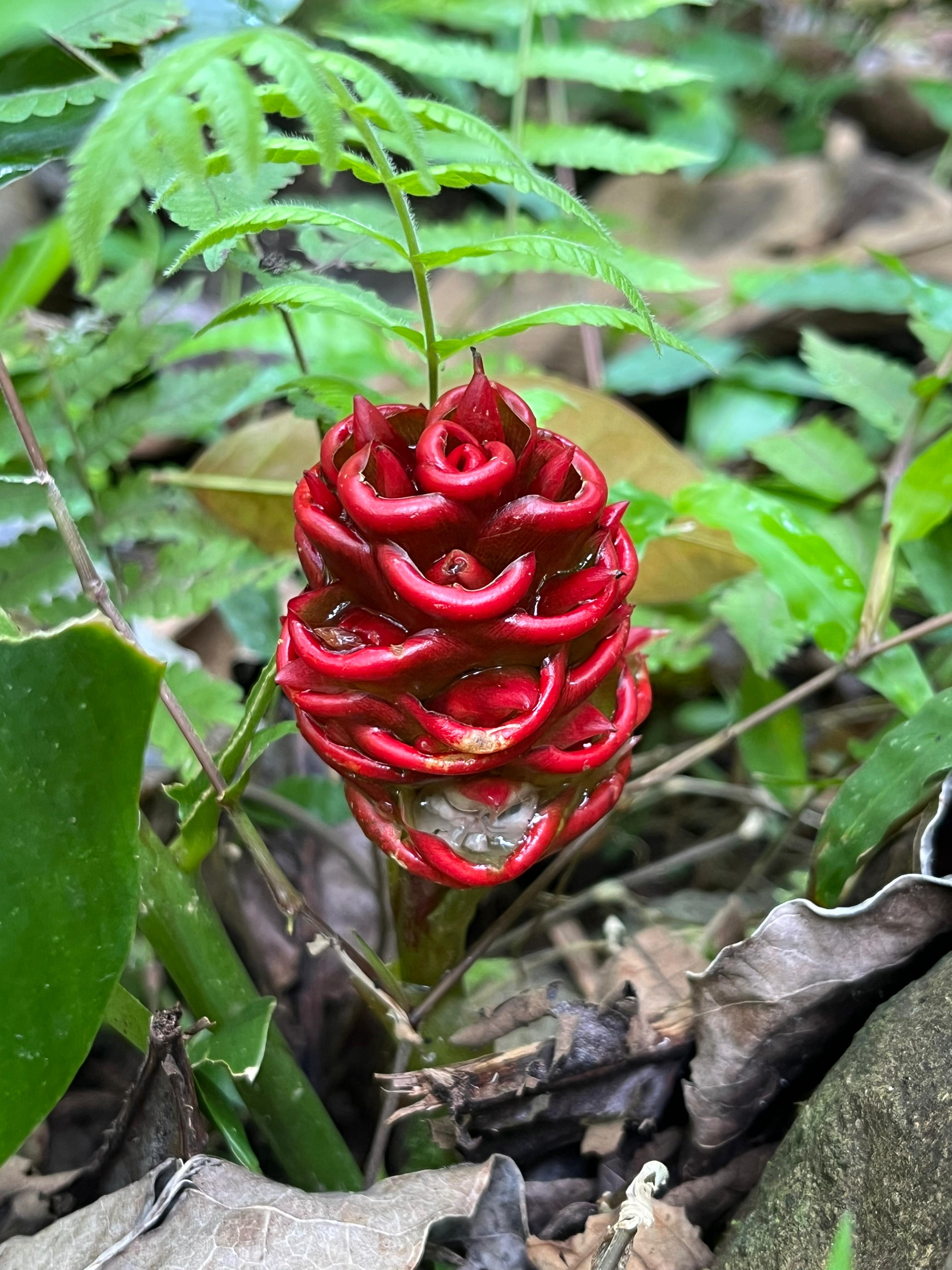

== See also ==
- Domesticated plants and animals of Austronesia
