= 9alpha-copalyl-diphosphate diphosphate-lyase =

9alpha-copalyl-diphosphate diphosphate-lyase may refer to:

- Stemar-13-ene synthase, an enzyme
- Stemod-13(17)-ene synthase, an enzyme
- Syn-pimara-7,15-diene synthase, an enzyme
- Aphidicolan-16beta-ol synthase, an enzyme
- Labdatriene synthase, an enzyme
