= Ent-copalyl-diphosphate diphosphate-lyase =

Ent-copalyl-diphosphate diphosphate-lyase may refer to:

- Ent-cassa-12,15-diene synthase, an enzyme
- Ent-sandaracopimaradiene synthase, an enzyme
- Ent-pimara-8(14),15-diene synthase, an enzyme
- Ent-pimara-9(11),15-diene synthase, an enzyme
- Ent-isokaurene synthase, an enzyme
