= Pterocarpan =

Class of chemical compounds

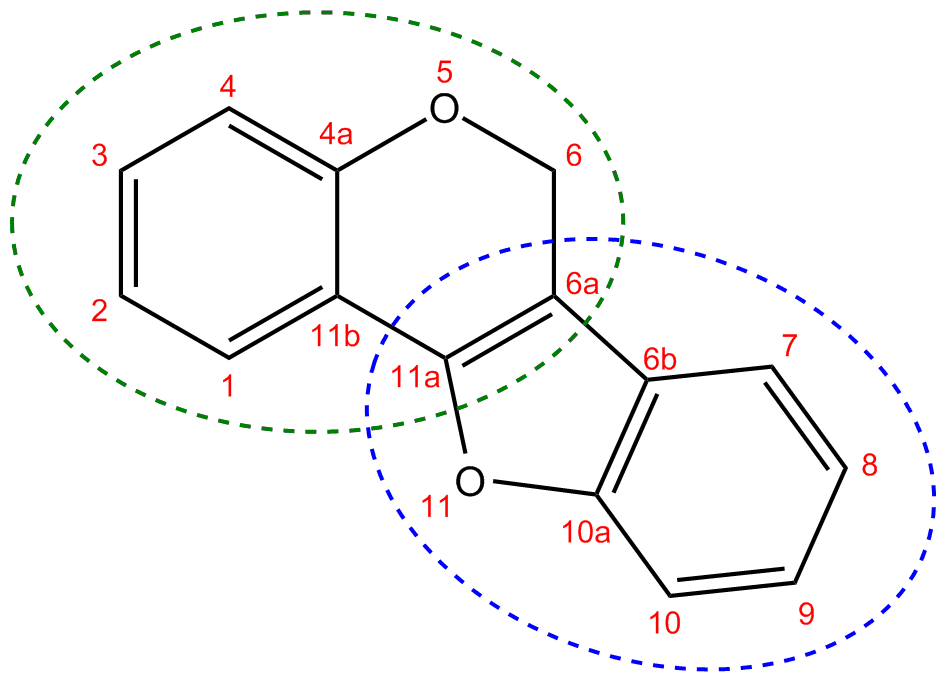
Pterocarpan chemical structure. It consists of a 1-benzofuran moiety (dotted blue circle) fused to a 2H-chromene moiety (dotted green circle). The systematic name for it is 6H-[1]benzofuro[3,2-c]chromene. The new numbering of the resulting moiety is shown with red numbers.

Pterocarpans are derivatives of isoflavonoids found in the family Fabaceae. It is a group of compounds which can be described as benzo-pyrano-furano-benzenes (i.e. 6H-[1]benzofuro[3,2-c]chromene skeleton) which can be formed by coupling of the B ring to the 4-one position.

2'-hydroxyisoflavone reductase is the enzyme responsible for the conversion in Cicer arietinum and glyceollin synthase for the production of glyceollins, phytoalexins in soybean.

== Known compounds ==
Medicarpin chemical structure

Phaseolin – a prenylated pterocarpan – chemical structure

Glyceollin III – a prenylated pterocarpan – chemical structure

- Bitucarpin A and B, isolated from the aerial parts of Mediterranean plants Bituminaria morisiana and Bituminaria bituminosa
- Erybraedin A and B, isolated from the stems of Erythrina subumbrans and C, isolated from the leaves of Bituminaria morisiana
- Erythrabyssin II, erystagallin A, erythrabissin-1, and erycristagallin isolated from the stems of Erythrina subumbrans
- Glycinol, glyceollidin I and II, glyceollins (glyceollin I, II, III and IV), found in the soybean (Glycine max)
- Glycyrrhizol A, isolated from the root of the Chinese licorice plant (Glycyrrhiza uralensis)
- Maackiain, isolated from the roots of Maackia amurensis subsp. Buergeri
- Medicarpin, found in Medicago truncatula
- Morisianine, isolated from the seeds of Bituminaria morisiana
- Orientanol A, isolated from the wood of Erythrina orientalis
- Phaseolin, found in French bean seeds
- Pisatin, found in Pisum sativum
- Striatine, isolated from aerial parts of Mundulea striata
- Trifolirhizin, found in Sophora flavescens
