= Rishitin =

Names
- IUPAC name 15-Nor-4α-eremophila-5(10),11-diene-2α,3β-diol
- Systematic IUPAC name (1S,2R,3R,7R)-1-Methyl-7-(prop-1-en-2-yl)-1,2,3,4,5,6,7,8-octahydronaphthalene-2,3-diol
- Other names 2,3-Naphthalenediol, 1,2,3,4,5,6,7,8-octahydro-1-methyl-7-(1-methylethenyl)-, (1S,2R,3R,7R)-

Identifiers
CAS Number	18178-54-6
3D model (JSmol)	Interactive image
ChEBI	CHEBI:8870
ChemSpider	97166
KEGG	C09715
PubChem CID	108064
UNII	FQY1K3HR10
CompTox Dashboard (EPA)	DTXSID60171184
- InChI: InChI=1S/C14H22O2/c1-8(2)10-4-5-11-7-13(15)14(16)9(3)12(11)6-10/h9-10,13-16H,1,4-7H2,2-3H3/t9-,10+,13+,14+/m0/s1 Key: XSCYYIVXGBKTOC-GZZJDILISA-N
- SMILES: C[C@@H]1[C@H]([C@@H](CC2=C1C[C@@H](CC2)C(=C)C)O)O

Properties
Chemical formula	C_{14}H_{22}O_{2}
Molar mass	222.328 g/mol
- Except where otherwise noted, data are given for materials in their standard state (at 25 °C [77 °F], 100 kPa). Infobox references

Rishitin is a terpenoid compound, produced by some plants belonging to the Solanum family, including the potato and tomato. Rishitin belongs to a heterogeneous group of anti-microbial plant defense compounds termed phytoalexins and is produced upon pathogen attack. Same as the phytoalexin capsidiol, it belongs to the group of sesquiterpenes and is as such an FPP derivative. Rishitin was named after the potato cultivar Rishiri, where it was first discovered in 1968.

== Biosynthesis ==
The biosynthetic pathway of rishitin has not yet been fully elucidated, and is still an active topic of research. Currently, the enzymes responsible for the synthesis of rishitin have not yet been discovered. Studies using radioisotope labeled compounds, revealed however that solavetivone, 15-hydroxysolavetivone, lubimin and 3-hydroxylubimin are precursors of rishitin.
