= Glyceollin I =

Names
- Preferred IUPAC name (6aS,11aS)-2,2-Dimethyl-2H,6H-[1]benzofuro[3,2-c]pyrano[2,3-h][1]benzopyran-6a,9(11aH)-diol
- Other names (−)-Glyceollin I

Identifiers
CAS Number	57103-57-8
3D model (JSmol)	Interactive image
ChEBI	CHEBI:16470
ChemSpider	142931
ECHA InfoCard	100.222.666
KEGG	C01701
PubChem CID	162807
UNII	6461TV6UCH
CompTox Dashboard (EPA)	DTXSID10205726
- InChI: InChI=1S/C20H18O5/c1-19(2)8-7-12-15(25-19)6-4-13-17(12)23-10-20(22)14-5-3-11(21)9-16(14)24-18(13)20/h3-9,18,21-22H,10H2,1-2H3/t18-,20+/m0/s1 Key: YIFYYPKWOQSCRI-AZUAARDMSA-N
- SMILES: CC1(C=Cc2c(ccc3c2OC[C@@]4([C@H]3Oc5c4ccc(c5)O)O)O1)C

Properties
Chemical formula	C_{20}H_{18}O_{5}
Molar mass	338 g/mol
- Except where otherwise noted, data are given for materials in their standard state (at 25 °C [77 °F], 100 kPa). Infobox references

Glyceollin I is a glyceollin, a type of prenylated pterocarpan. It is a phytoalexin found in the soybean.

In in vitro studies, this molecule has been shown to exhibit antiestrogenic properties.

== Biosynthesis ==
All the glyceollins are products of a pathway in soybean which starts from the amino acid L-phenylalanine. This is converted in a series of steps to the flavanone, liquiritigenin, and then by the action of isoflavonoid synthase (IFS) to the isoflavone, daidzein.

phenylalanine
Steps
liquiritigenin
IFS
daidzein

A further sequence of four enzyme-catalysed reactions creates the pterocarpan ring system of the compound glycinol. The prenylation enzyme trihydroxypterocarpan dimethylallyltransferase (G4DT) and then glyceollin synthase (GS) complete the biosynthesis of glyceollin I.

glycinol
G4DT
4-glyceollidin
GS
glyceollin I

== Chemical synthesis ==
Glyceollin I has been synthesized in the laboratory at a multigram scale.
