= C20H18O5 =

The molecular formula C_{20}H_{18}O_{5} (molar mass : 338.35 g/mol, exact mass : 338.115424 u) may refer to:

- Desmethoxycurcumin, a curcuminoid
- Glyceollin I, a pterocarpan found in soybeans
- Glyceollin III, a pterocarpan found in soybeans
- Wighteone, an isoflavone found in Maclura aurantiaca
- Licoflavone C
