= Glycinol =

Glycinol may refer to:

- a synonym for ethanolamine
- Glycinol (pterocarpan), a phytoalexin found in soybean
