= 3,9-dihydroxypterocarpan 6a-monooxygenase =

Class of enzymes

Identifiers
- EC no.: 1.14.14.93
- CAS no.: 92584-16-2

Databases
- IntEnz: IntEnz view
- BRENDA: BRENDA entry
- ExPASy: NiceZyme view
- KEGG: KEGG entry
- MetaCyc: metabolic pathway
- PRIAM: profile
- PDB structures: RCSB PDB PDBe PDBsum
- Gene Ontology: AmiGO / QuickGO
Search
- PMC: articles
- PubMed: articles
- NCBI: proteins

3,9-dihydroxypterocarpan 6a-monooxygenase (EC 1.14.14.93) is an enzyme that catalyzes the chemical reaction

3,9-dihydroxypterocarpan
+ NADPH + H^{+}
O_{2}
H_{2}O
glycinol
+ NADP^{+}

The four substrates of this enzyme are (6aR,11aR)-3,9-dihydroxypterocarpan, reduced nicotinamide adenine dinucleotide phosphate (NADPH), oxygen, and a proton. Its products are glycinol, oxidised NADP^{+}, and water.

3,9-dihydroxypterocarpan 6a-monooxygenase is a cytochrome P450 protein containing heme. It requires a partner, cytochrome P450 reductase which uses NADPH, for functional expression. The systematic name of this enzyme class is (6aR,11aR)-3,9-dihydroxypterocarpan,NADPH:oxygen oxidoreductase (6a-hydroxylating). Other names in common use include 3,9-dihydroxypterocarpan 6a-hydroxylase, and 3,9-dihydroxypterocarpan 6alpha-monooxygenase (erroneous). It is part of the biosynthetic pathway to phytoalexins in soybean.
