= Glyceollin III =

Type of pterocarpan found in the soybean

- Chemical structure of glyceollin III

Names
- Preferred IUPAC name (2S,6aS,11aS)-2-(Prop-1-en-2-yl)-1,2-dihydro-6H-[1]benzofuro[3,2-c]furo[3,2-g][1]benzopyran-6a,9(11aH)-diol

Identifiers
CAS Number	61080-23-7
3D model (JSmol)	Interactive image
ChEBI	CHEBI:52086
ChEMBL	ChEMBL2229450
ChemSpider	10128488
KEGG	C15511
PubChem CID	11954193
UNII	629FG6XLLL
CompTox Dashboard (EPA)	DTXSID20976571
- InChI: InChI=1S/C20H18O5/c1-10(2)15-6-11-5-13-17(8-16(11)24-15)23-9-20(22)14-4-3-12(21)7-18(14)25-19(13)20/h3-5,7-8,15,19,21-22H,1,6,9H2,2H3/t15-,19-,20+/m0/s1 Key: MIYTVBARXCVVHZ-RYGJVYDSSA-N
- SMILES: CC(=C)[C@@H]1Cc2cc3c(cc2O1)OC[C@@]4([C@H]3Oc5c4ccc(c5)O)O

Properties
Chemical formula	C_{20}H_{18}O_{5}
Molar mass	338.35 g/mol
- Except where otherwise noted, data are given for materials in their standard state (at 25 °C [77 °F], 100 kPa). Infobox references

Glyceollin III is a glyceollin, a type of pterocarpan, found in the soybean (Glycine max). It has an antiestrogenic effect in vivo. In soil, it has an antifungal activity against Aspergillus sojae.

== Biosynthesis ==
All the glyceollins are products of a pathway in soybean which starts from the amino acid L-phenylalanine. This is converted in a series of steps to the flavanone, liquiritigenin, and then by the action of isoflavonoid synthase (IFS) to the isoflavone, daidzein.

phenylalanine
Steps
liquiritigenin
IFS
daidzein

A further sequence of four enzyme-catalysed reactions creates the pterocarpan ring system of the compound glycinol. The prenylation enzyme trihydroxypterocarpan dimethylallyltransferase (G4DT) and then glyceollin synthase (GS) complete the biosynthesis of glyceollin III.

glycinol
G4DT
glyceocarpin
GS
glyceollin III
