= Glyceollin =

Group of plant chemicals

Glyceollins are a family of prenylated pterocarpans found in soybean whose production is enhanced in response to symbiotic infection and that act as phytoalexins. They are derived from the isoflavone, daidzein.

== Biosynthesis ==
All the glyceollins are products of a pathway in soybean which starts from the amino acid L-phenylalanine. This is converted in a series of reactions to the flavanone, liquiritigenin and then to the isoflavone, daidzein. A further sequence of four enzyme-catalysed steps creates the pterocarpan ring system of the compound glycinol.

daidzein
4 steps
glycinol
G4DT
4-glyceollidin
GS
glyceollin I

The prenylation enzyme trihydroxypterocarpan dimethylallyltransferase (G4DT) and then glyceollin synthase (GS) complete the biosynthesis of glyceollin I. The enzyme G4DT can add the prenyl group in an alternative position in glycinol, giving glycerocarpin. This forms glyceollin II when aced on by glyceollin synthase:

glyceocarpin
GS
glyceollin II

The synthase enzyme also produces the isomer, glyceollin III, from glyceocarpin:

glyceocarpin
GS
glyceollin III

Glyceocarpin is also the precursor to a methylated derivative called glyceollin IV and other related compounds are known to be produced.

== Chemical synthesis ==
Glyceollin I has been synthesized in the laboratory at a gram level scale.

== Effects ==
The glyceollins are phytoalexins which help to protect soybean against infection by pathogens such as the bacteria, Rhizobium japonicum, and the fungii Phytophthora sojae, Macrophomina phaseolina, and Aspergillus sojae. They also help defend against the plant parasitic nematode, Meloidogyne incognita. Glyceollins have been shown to exhibit antiestrogenic properties in vitro and in vivo.

== Inhibitors of glyceollin production ==
Some pathogens produce inhibitors that block the biosynthetic path to glyceollins. For example, Phytophthora megasperma produces an extracellular invertase, a glycoprotein of mannan, which prevents glyceollin accumulation.
