= C12H18O4 =

The molecular formula C_{12}H_{18}O_{4} (molar mass: 226.27 g/mol, exact mass: 226.1205 u) may refer to:

- Allixin
- Dibutyl squarate
- 1,6-Hexanediol diacrylate
