= Aveeno =

Brand of skin care and hair care products

- Industry: Skin and hair care
- Founded: 1945; 81 years ago
- Founder: Albert Musher; Sidney Musher
- Headquarters: United States
- Area served: Worldwide
- Parent: Kenvue
- Website: www.aveeno.com

Aveeno is an American brand of skin care and hair care products owned by American consumer health company Kenvue.

The active ingredients in all Aveeno products are colloidal oats or oat extracts—avenanthramides, which have been branded as "active naturals". The brand slogan is "Better Ingredients. Better Skincare: Aveeno." Aveeno offers products to treat skin conditions such as eczema, psoriasis, urushiol-induced contact dermatitis, pruritus ani, chickenpox, hives, and sunburn.

The name Aveeno is derived from the scientific name for the common oat, Avena sativa which belongs to the family Poaceae.

== History ==
Aveeno was founded in 1945 by brothers Albert and Sidney Musher, working in conjunction with the Mayo Clinic. They discovered that finely milled colloidal oatmeal could help with dry, sensitive skin. Their first product was their Soothing Bath Treatment. In 1961, the company changed its name to Aveeno Pharmaceuticals with Albert serving as president and Sydney as vice president. The brand was later acquired by Cooper Laboratories and placed under the company's Coopercare division.

S.C. Johnson & Son acquired the Aveeno brand from Cooper Labs in 1984. It remained under the Rydelle Laboratories division until the name was dropped in 1989. The company's skin care business, including the Aveeno brand, was purchased by Johnson & Johnson in 1999. The new owners redesigned the bottle and repositioned Aveeno as a high-end natural skincare brand. In 2001, the brand added soy and stress relief product lines as well as Aveeno Baby and Aveeno Skin Relief Body Wash. Aveeno became the fastest growing product in the hand and body lotion segment by 2003.

In 2004, the brand launched into the facial care category with the Positively Radiant line, based on the "Active Soy" ingredient. In 2005, Aveeno Clear Complexion acne care was introduced and in 2006, Aveeno Ultra Calming launched. In 2007, Aveeno Anti-Aging was introduced to the market.

By 2014, Aveeno's body care products in the US exceeded $100 million and ranked third in market share. Aveeno was introduced to the Chinese market in 2016 through the Tmall website.

In 2023, Johnson & Johnson spun off its consumer health business, including Aveeno, as a separate company called Kenvue. In 2025, Kenvue was acquired by Kimberly-Clark.

In 2026, Aveeno announced a three year research and innovation collaboration with the Mayo Clinic, to advance knowledge on skin health and products.

== Spokesmodels ==
In January 2013, Jennifer Aniston was announced as the Aveeno spokesperson. She replaced Daniella van Graas, who had been Aveeno's spokesmodel and 'face' for many years. Aniston reportedly received "eight figures" for the role.

== Environmental and health concerns ==
Aveeno has been criticized for selling products that contain microbeads, small plastic balls that are not removed in sewage treatment works, and often end up in the ocean. Johnson & Johnson promised to remove microbeads from their products by 2017.

In July 2021, previous parent company Johnson & Johnson recalled many Aveeno and Neutrogena aerosol spray sunscreens in the United States, after detecting benzene, a chemical that can cause cancer. The company stated that benzene is not used in the manufacturing process of the sprays and that they have begun an investigation into the source of the contamination. Legal action followed and was settled in 2023.

== See also ==
- Avenanthramide § Anti-inflammatory and anti-itch properties
