= Phaseolin (pterocarpan) =

- Chemical structure of phaseolin

Names
- IUPAC name 3,3-Dimethyl-6b,12b-dihydro-3H,7H-furo[3,2-c:5,4-f']dichromen-10-ol
- Other names Phaseollin; Abyssinone I (-)-Phaseollin

Identifiers
CAS Number	13401-40-6
3D model (JSmol)	Interactive image
ChEBI	CHEBI:108
ChEMBL	ChEMBL448350
ChemSpider	82683
PubChem CID	91572
UNII	8OHL7771FZ
CompTox Dashboard (EPA)	DTXSID701029664
- InChI: InChI=1S/C20H18O4/c1-20(2)8-7-14-16(24-20)6-5-12-15-10-22-17-9-11(21)3-4-13(17)19(15)23-18(12)14/h3-9,15,19,21H,10H2,1-2H3/t15-,19-/m0/s1 Key: LWTDZKXXJRRKDG-KXBFYZLASA-N
- SMILES: [H][C@]12C3=CC=C(O)C=C3OC[C@@]1([H])C4=C(C(C=CC(C)(C)O5)=C5C=C4)O2

Properties
Chemical formula	C_{20}H_{18}O_{4}
Molar mass	322.360 g·mol^{−1}
- Except where otherwise noted, data are given for materials in their standard state (at 25 °C [77 °F], 100 kPa). verify (what is ?) Infobox references

Phaseolin is a prenylated pterocarpan found in French bean (Phaseolus vulgaris) seeds and in the stems of Erythrina subumbrans.
