= Bituminaria morisiana =

Scientific classification
- Kingdom: Plantae
- Clade: Tracheophytes
- Clade: Angiosperms
- Clade: Eudicots
- Clade: Rosids
- Order: Fabales
- Family: Fabaceae
- Subfamily: Faboideae
- Genus: Bituminaria
- Species: B. morisiana

Binomial name
- Bituminaria morisiana (Pignatti & Metlesics) Greuter

Synonyms
- Psoralea morisiana Pignatti & Metlesics

Species of legume

Bituminaria morisiana is a perennial Mediterranean herb species in the genus Bituminaria. Leaf, trifoliate with 3 linear, lanceolate, tomentose leaflets. White flowers in globose flowerheads. Fruit a tomentose legume. Flowers May–July. It is endemic to Sardinia where it is restricted to high mountain areas, such as Monte Albo and Monte Corrasi.

The pterocarpans bitucarpin A and B can be isolated from the aerial parts of B. morisiana, erybraedin C from the leaves and morisianine is isolated from the seeds.

== See also ==
- Giardino Montano Linasia in San Benedetto, Iglesias, Province of Carbonia-Iglesias, Sardinia, Italy
- Fiori spontanei della Sardegna, Renato Brotzu, Quaderni di Natura Il Maestrale-Nuoro, 1998, Italia, ISBN 88-8610918-0
