= Ent-cassa-12,15-diene synthase =

ent-cassa-12,15-diene synthase

Identifiers
- EC no.: 4.2.3.28

Databases
- IntEnz: IntEnz view
- BRENDA: BRENDA entry
- ExPASy: NiceZyme view
- KEGG: KEGG entry
- MetaCyc: metabolic pathway
- PRIAM: profile
- PDB structures: RCSB PDB PDBe PDBsum
Search
- PMC: articles
- PubMed: articles
- NCBI: proteins

ent-Cassa-12,15-diene synthase (EC 4.2.3.28, OsDTC1, OsKS7) is an enzyme with systematic name ent-copalyl-diphosphate diphosphate-lyase (ent-cassa-12,15-diene-forming). This enzyme catalyses the following chemical reaction

ent-copalyl diphosphate $\rightleftharpoons$ ent-cassa-12,15-diene + diphosphate

This class I diterpene cyclase produces ent-cassa-12,15-diene, a precursor of the rice phytoalexins (-)-phytocassanes A-E.
