= Deuterolysin =

Class of enzymes

Identifiers
- EC no.: 3.4.24.39
- CAS no.: 247028-11-1

Databases
- BRENDA: enzyme data
- ExPASy: NiceZyme view
- KEGG: enzyme entry
- MetaCyc: metabolic pathway
- Rhea: reactions
- PDB structures: RCSB PDB PDBe PDBsum
Search
- PMC: articles
- PubMed: articles
- NCBI: proteins

Deuterolysin (EC 3.4.24.39, Penicillium roqueforti protease II, microbial neutral proteinase II, acid metalloproteinase, neutral proteinase II, Penicillium roqueforti metalloproteinase) is an enzyme. This enzyme catalyses the following chemical reaction

Preferential cleavage of bonds with hydrophobic residues in P1'; also Asn^{3}-Gln and Gly^{8}-Ser bonds in insulin B chain

This enzyme is present in Penicillium roqueforti, P. caseicolum, Pyricularia oryzae, Aspergillus sojae and A. oryzae.
