= Daniel Musher =

American scientist

Daniel Michael Musher is an American physician, scientist, and medical educator working in the field of infectious diseases, who has coauthored more than 600 publications. Musher is a Distinguished Service Professor of Medicine and Professor of Molecular Virology and Microbiology at the Baylor College of Medicine in Houston, Texas.

== Education and early career ==
Musher was born in New York in 1938 to Hadassah and Sidney Musher. His father was a food chemist and inventor, and his mother a school teacher. He graduated from Brooklyn Technical High School and then Harvard College magna cum laude in history. He went on to Columbia College of Physicians and Surgeons, served as an intern and resident on the Columbia division of Bellevue Hospital, and then entered the military, where he was head of internal medicine at Laredo Air Force Base from 1965-1967. Musher was then an NIH Fellow at Tufts-New England Medical Center under the mentorship of Louis Weinstein.

Musher is a grandson of Rabbi Mordecai Kaplan

== Medical career ==
Musher’s principal scientific contributions have been in bacterial diseases. He called attention to the role of the macrophage in the immune response to syphilis, described the spectrum and noted the increasing importance of infection due to Staphylococcus aureus, recognized non-typeable Haemophilus influenzae, and Moraxella catarrhalis as common causes of community-acquired pneumonia (CAP), developed the currently used ELISA for measuring antibody to pneumococcal capsular polysaccharide, studied the response to pneumococcal polysaccharide vaccine and demonstrated that variable responsiveness was governed by genetic factors, called attention to acute cardiac events during pneumococcal pneumonia and other acute infections reported on the etiology of CAP and showed that normal respiratory flora cause CAP in some proportion of cases.

He has written chapters on pneumonia and pneumococcal infections for textbooks of medicine and has co-authored national guidelines for management of CAP. His work has been recognized with the DeBakey Medal for research, the CDC’s Nakano citation for epidemiology and the Outstanding Clinician and Teacher award by the Infectious Diseases Society of America.

== Selected publications ==
- Schell R, Musher D, Jacobson K, Schwethelm P. Induction of acquired cellular resistance following transfer of thymus-dependent lymphocytes from syphilitic rabbits. J Immunol 1975;114:550-3.
- Musher DM, McKenzie SO. Infections due to Staphylococcus aureus. Medicine (Baltimore) 1977;56:383-409.
- Musher DM, Kubitschek KR, Crennan J, Baughn RE. Pneumonia and acute febrile tracheobronchitis due to Haemophilus influenzae. Ann Intern Med 1983;99:444-50.
- Wallace RJ, Jr., Musher DM. In honor of Dr. Sarah Branham, a star is born. The realization of Branhamella catarrhalis as a respiratory pathogen. Chest 1986;90:447-50.
- Musher DM, Luchi MJ, Watson DA, Hamilton R, Baughn RE. Pneumococcal polysaccharide vaccine in young adults and older bronchitics: determination of IgG responses by ELISA and the effect of adsorption of serum with non-type-specific cell wall polysaccharide. J Infect Dis 1990;161:728-35.
- Musher DM, Groover JE, Watson DA, et al. Genetic regulation of the capacity to make immunoglobulin G to pneumococcal capsular polysaccharides. J Investig Med 1997;45:57-68.
- Musher DM, Rueda AM, Kaka AS, Mapara SM. The association between pneumococcal pneumonia and acute cardiac events. Clin Infect Dis 2007;45:158-65.
- Corrales-Medina VF, Fatemi O, Serpa J, et al. The Association between Staphylococcus aureus bacteremia and acute myocardial infarction. Scand J Infect Dis 2009;In press.
- Musher DM, Roig IL, Cazares G, Stager CE, Logan N, Safar H. Can an etiologic agent be identified in adults who are hospitalized for community-acquired pneumonia: results of a one-year study. J Infect 2013;67:11-8.
- Musher DM, Abers MS. Community-Acquired Pneumonia Requiring Hospitalization. N Engl J Med 2015;373:2381.
