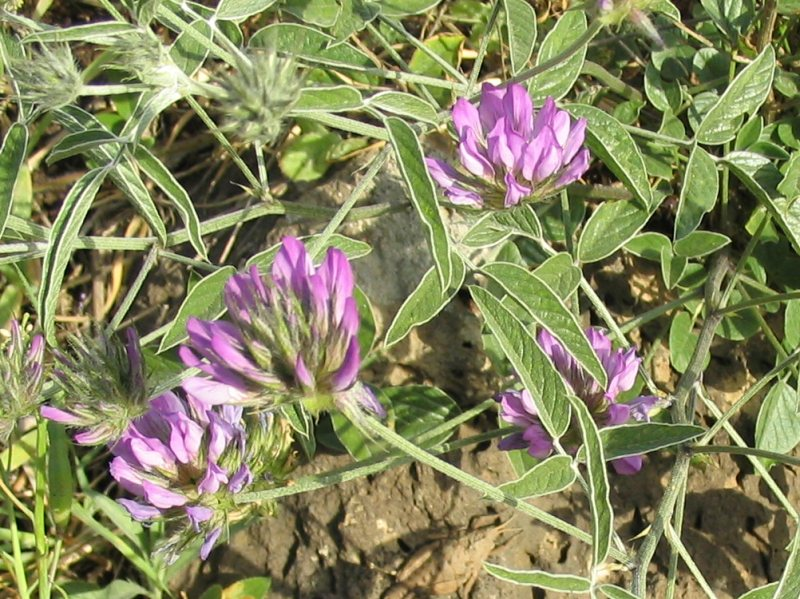
- Bituminaria bituminosa

Scientific classification
- Kingdom: Plantae
- Clade: Tracheophytes
- Clade: Angiosperms
- Clade: Eudicots
- Clade: Rosids
- Order: Fabales
- Family: Fabaceae
- Subfamily: Faboideae
- Tribe: Psoraleeae
- Genus: Bituminaria; Heist. ex Fabr. (1759), nom. cons. prop.

Species
- 10; see text

Synonyms
- Aspalthium Medik. (1787); Rhynchodium C.Presl (1845)

= Bituminaria =

Genus of legumes

Bituminaria is small genus of perennial herbs in the bean family. It includes 10 species, which range from Macaronesia through Mediterranean Basin of Europe, north Africa, and Western Asia to the Caucasus and Saudi Arabia.

10 species are accepted:

- Bituminaria antiatlantica Brullo, C.Brullo, Cambria, Cristaudo & Giusso – southwestern Morocco
- Bituminaria atropurpurea (Maire) Bogdanović, C.Brullo, Brullo, Cambria & Giusso – south-central Morocco
- Bituminaria basaltica Miniss., C.Brullo, Brullo, Giusso & Sciandr. – Sicily
- Bituminaria bituminosa (L.) C.H. Stirt. – Mediterranean Basin and Caucasus
- Bituminaria flaccida (Nábělek) Greuter – Jordan, Sinai, and Saudi Arabia
- Bituminaria kyreniae Giusso, C.Brullo, Brullo, Cambria & Miniss. – Cyprus
- Bituminaria morisiana (Pignatti & Metlesics) Greuter – Sardinia
- Bituminaria palaestina (Bassi) Brullo, C.Brullo, Miniss., Salmeri & Giusso – Levant
- Bituminaria plumosa (Rchb.) Bogdanović, C.Brullo, Brullo, Ljubičić & Giusso – Croatia
- Bituminaria tunetana C.Brullo, Brullo, Cambria, El Mokni & Giusso – Tunisia
