= Stemar-13-ene synthase =

Enzyme

Identifiers
- EC no.: 4.2.3.33

Databases
- IntEnz: IntEnz view
- BRENDA: BRENDA entry
- ExPASy: NiceZyme view
- KEGG: KEGG entry
- MetaCyc: metabolic pathway
- PRIAM: profile
- PDB structures: RCSB PDB PDBe PDBsum
Search
- PMC: articles
- PubMed: articles
- NCBI: proteins

Stemar-13-ene synthase (EC 4.2.3.33, OsDTC2, OsK8, OsKL8, OsKS8, stemarene synthase, syn-stemar-13-ene synthase) is an enzyme with systematic name 9α-copalyl-diphosphate diphosphate-lyase (stemar-13-ene-forming). This enzyme catalyses the following chemical reaction

9α-copalyl diphosphate $\rightleftharpoons$ stemar-13-ene + diphosphate

This diterpene cyclase produces stemar-13-ene, a putative precursor of the rice phytoalexin oryzalexin S.
