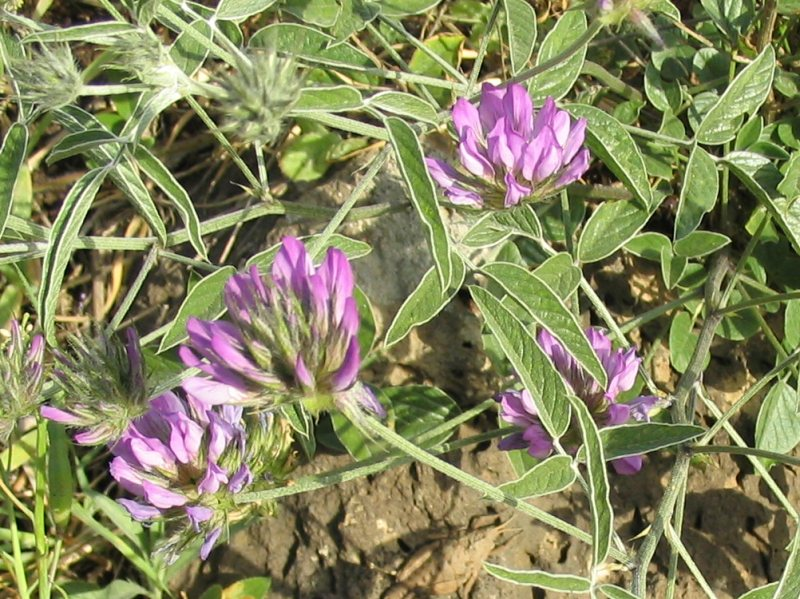

Scientific classification
- Kingdom: Plantae
- Clade: Embryophytes
- Clade: Tracheophytes
- Clade: Angiosperms
- Clade: Eudicots
- Clade: Rosids
- Order: Fabales
- Family: Fabaceae
- Subfamily: Faboideae
- Genus: Bituminaria
- Species: B. bituminosa

Binomial name
- Bituminaria bituminosa (L.) C.H.Stirt.

Subspecies
- Bituminaria bituminosa var. albomarginata (Canary Islands): Albo Tedera; Bituminaria bituminosa var. crassiuscula (Canary Islands): Teide Tedera; Bituminaria bituminosa var. bituminosa (Canary Islands): Tedera and (Mediterranean basin): Arabian pea; Pitch trefoil; Engraisse mouton Bituminaria bituminosa var. hulensis (Hula Valley, Israel): שרעול שעיר

Synonyms
- Psoralea bituminosa L. Aspalthium bituminosum (L.) Kuntze; Bituminaria bituminosa (L.) C.H.Stirt.

= Bituminaria bituminosa =

Species of legume

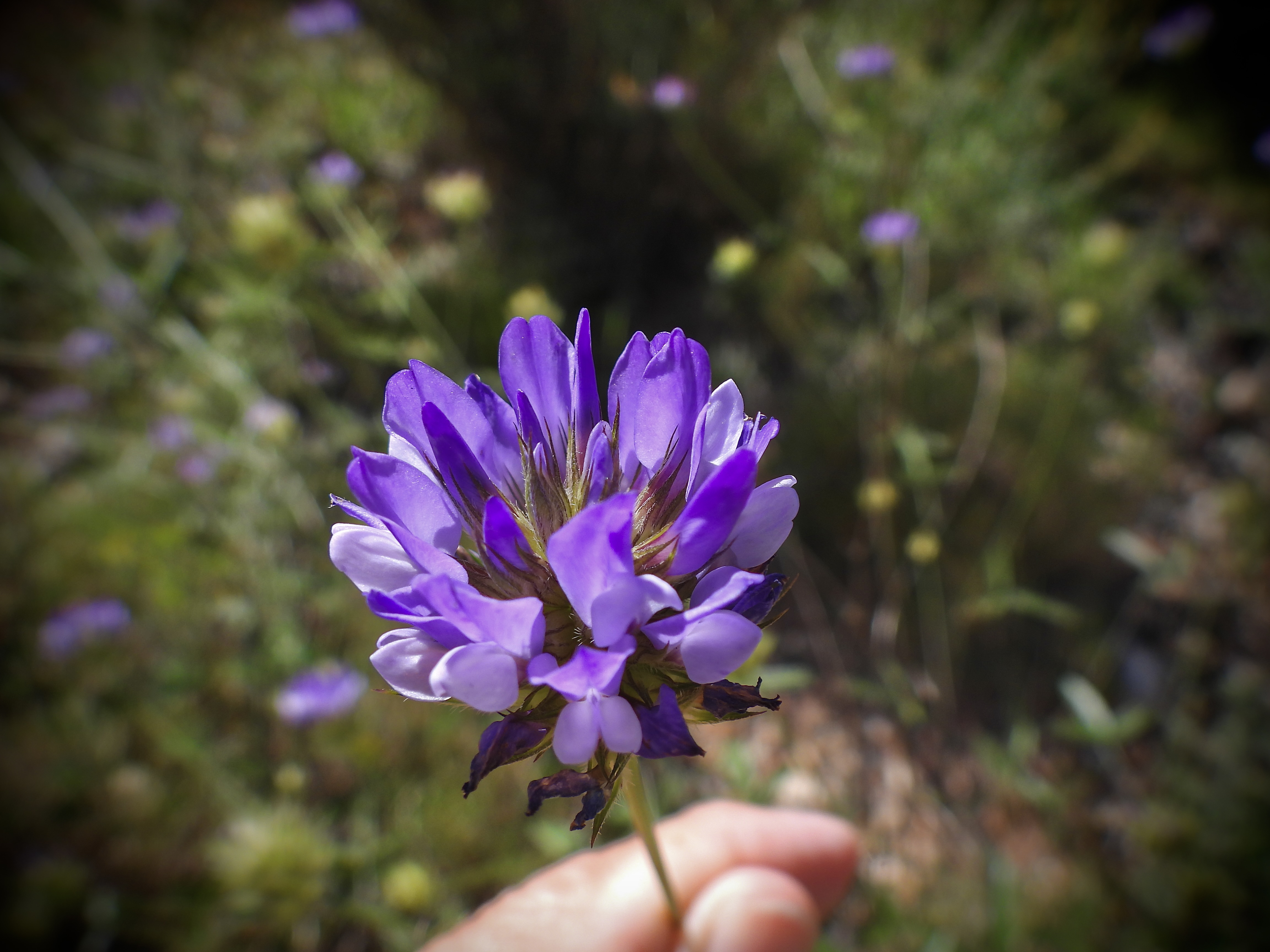
A close-up view of the violet-colored inflorescence of the pitch trefoil (Bituminaria bituminosa) found near Valderrobres, Spain - 2026.

Bituminaria bituminosa, the Arabian pea or pitch trefoil, is a perennial Mediterranean herb species in the genus Bituminaria.

The pterocarpans bitucarpin A and B can be isolated from the aerial parts of B. bituminosa.

It has several potential uses: (i) forage crop, (ii) Phytostabilization of heavy metal contaminated or degraded soils, (iii) Synthesis of furanocoumarins (psoralen, angelicin, xanthotoxin and bergapten), compounds of broad pharmaceutical interest.

It is easily recognizable by the characteristic smell of bitumen from its leaves. This strong tar-like characteristic aroma appears to be the result of a combination of several substances such as phenolics, sulphurated compounds, sesquiterpenes and probably short-chain hydrocarbon. Total polyphenols content was < 2% and the condensed tannins was <0.8% in a dry weight basis.

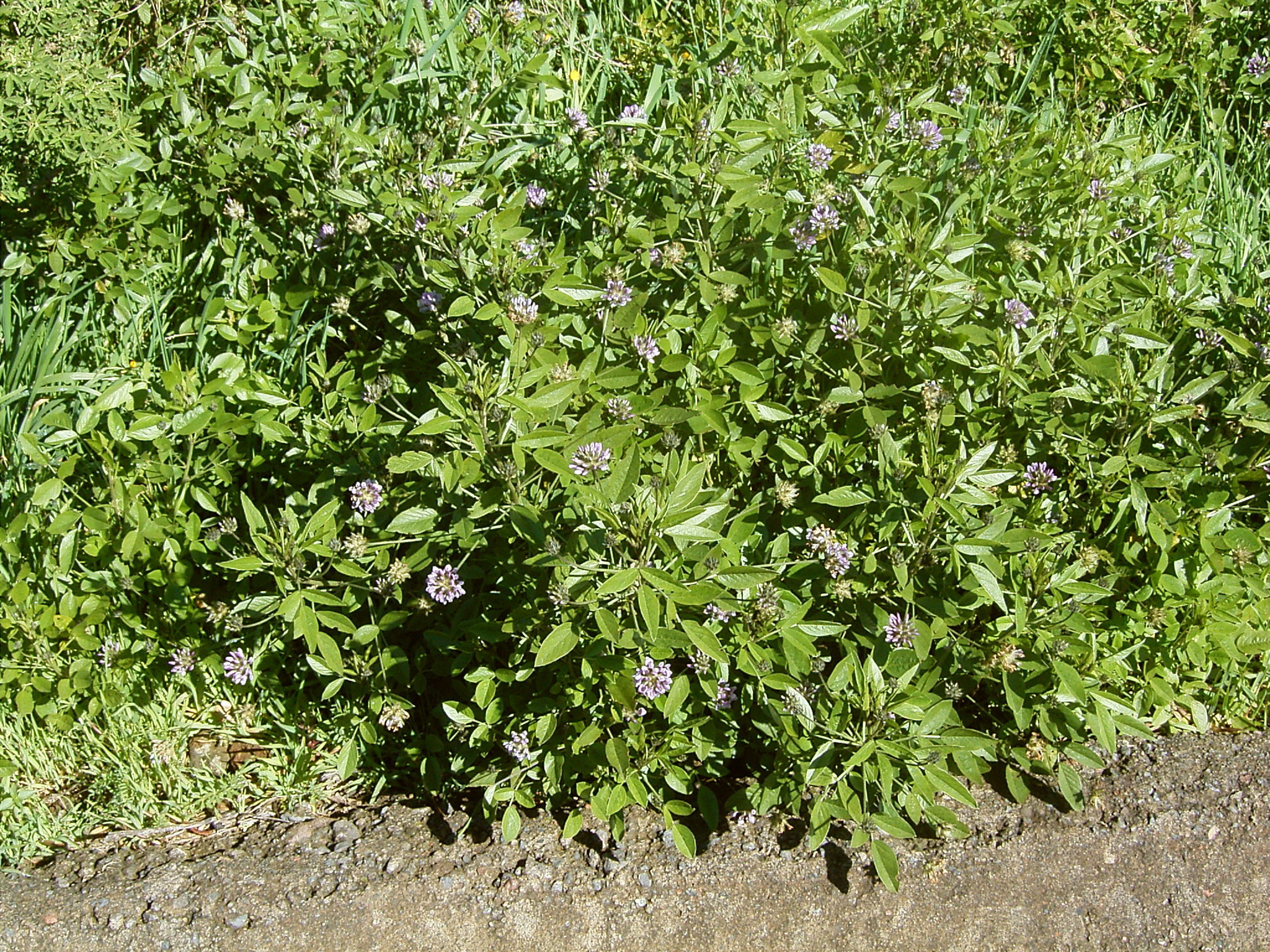

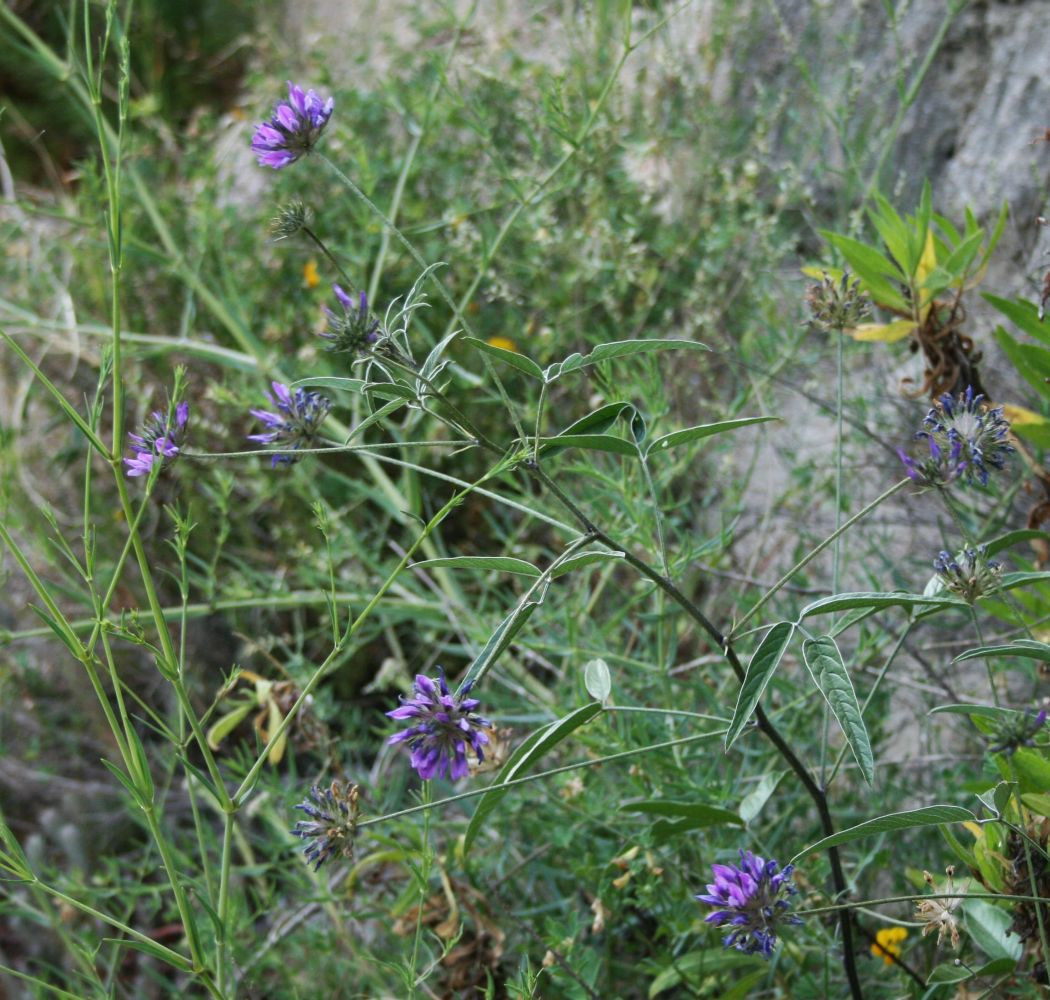

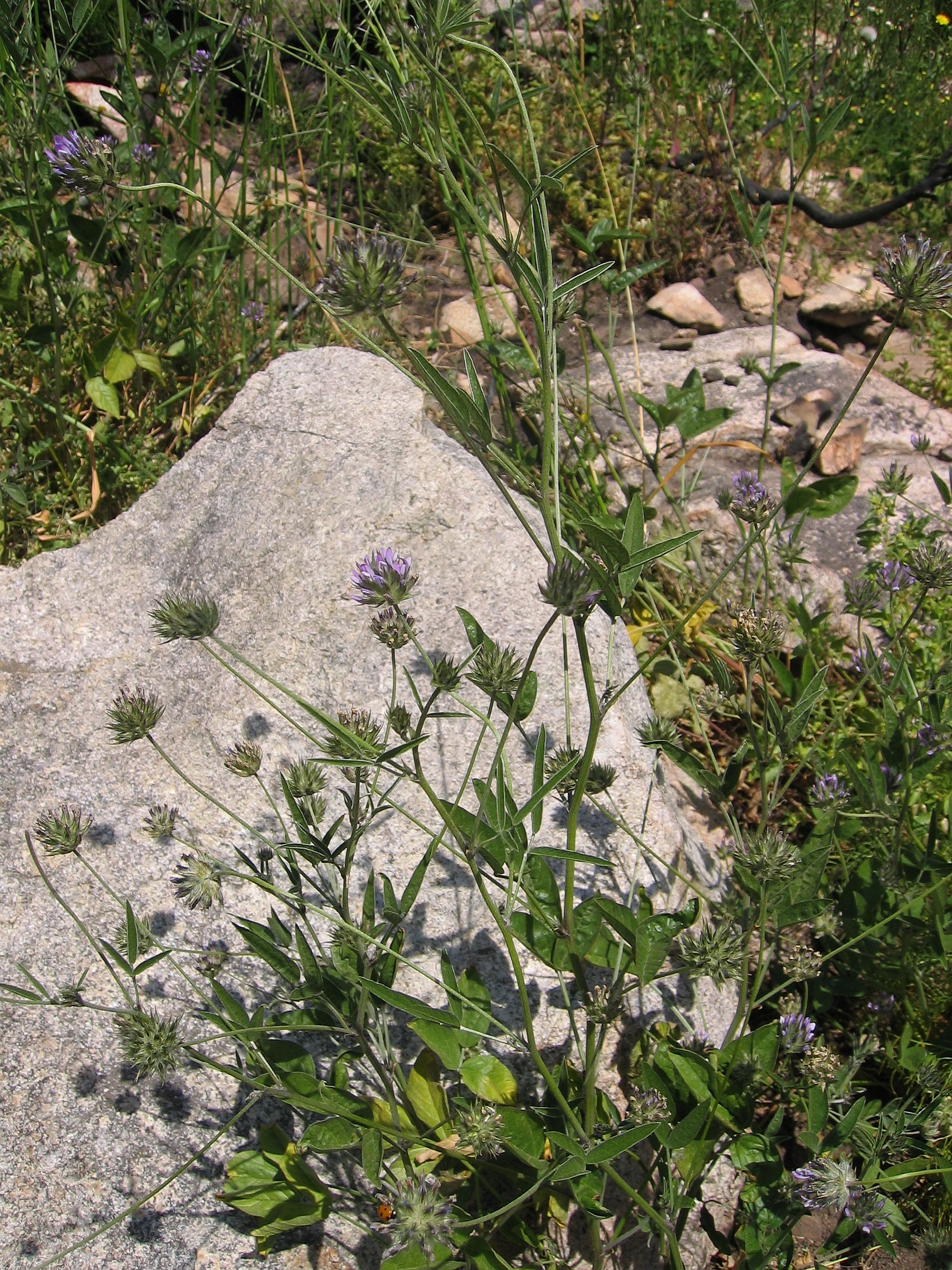

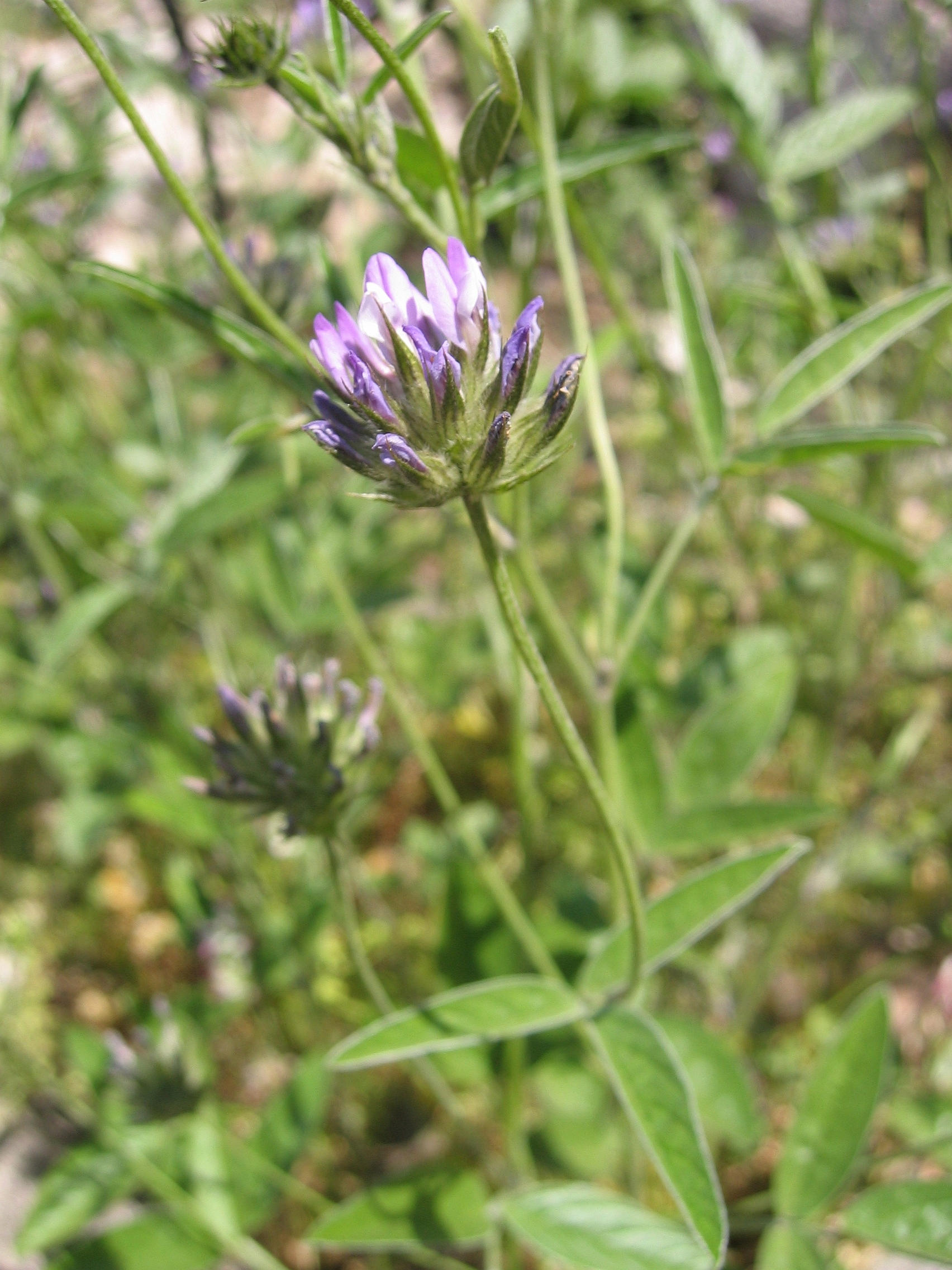

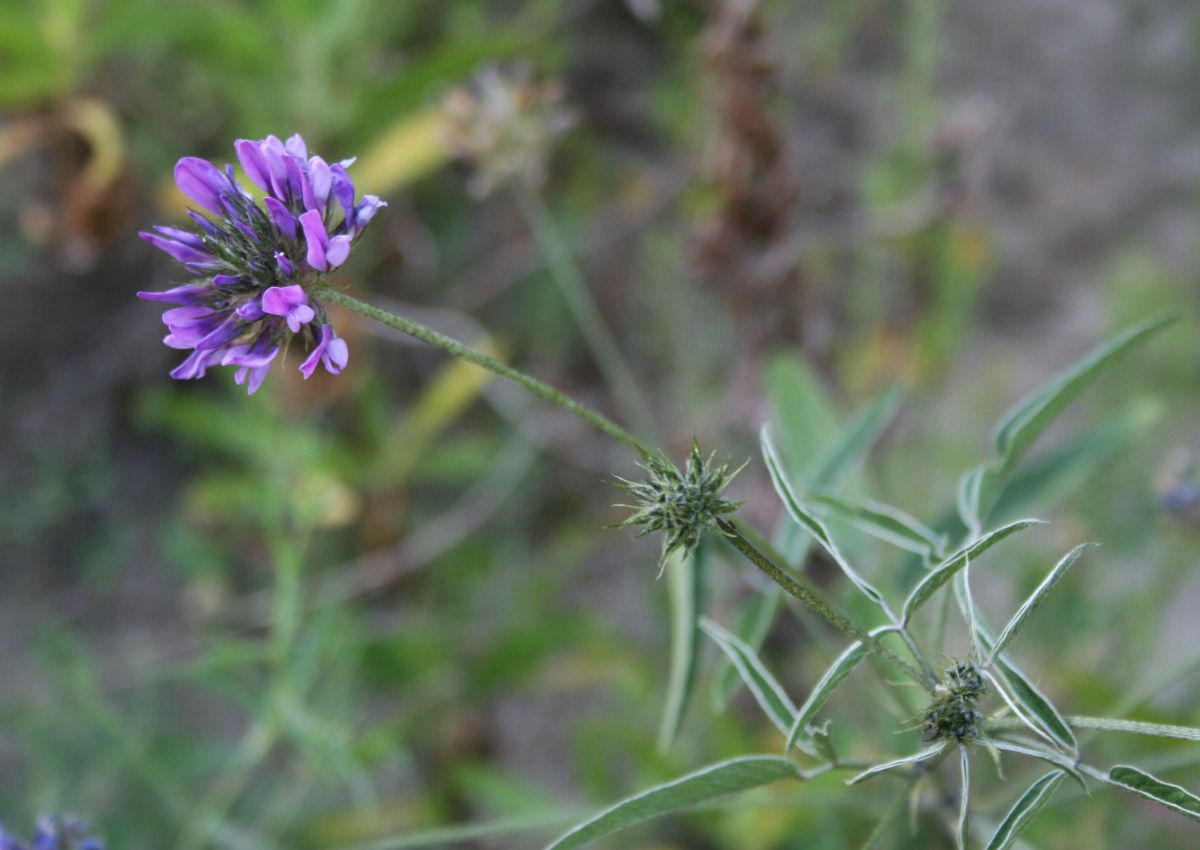

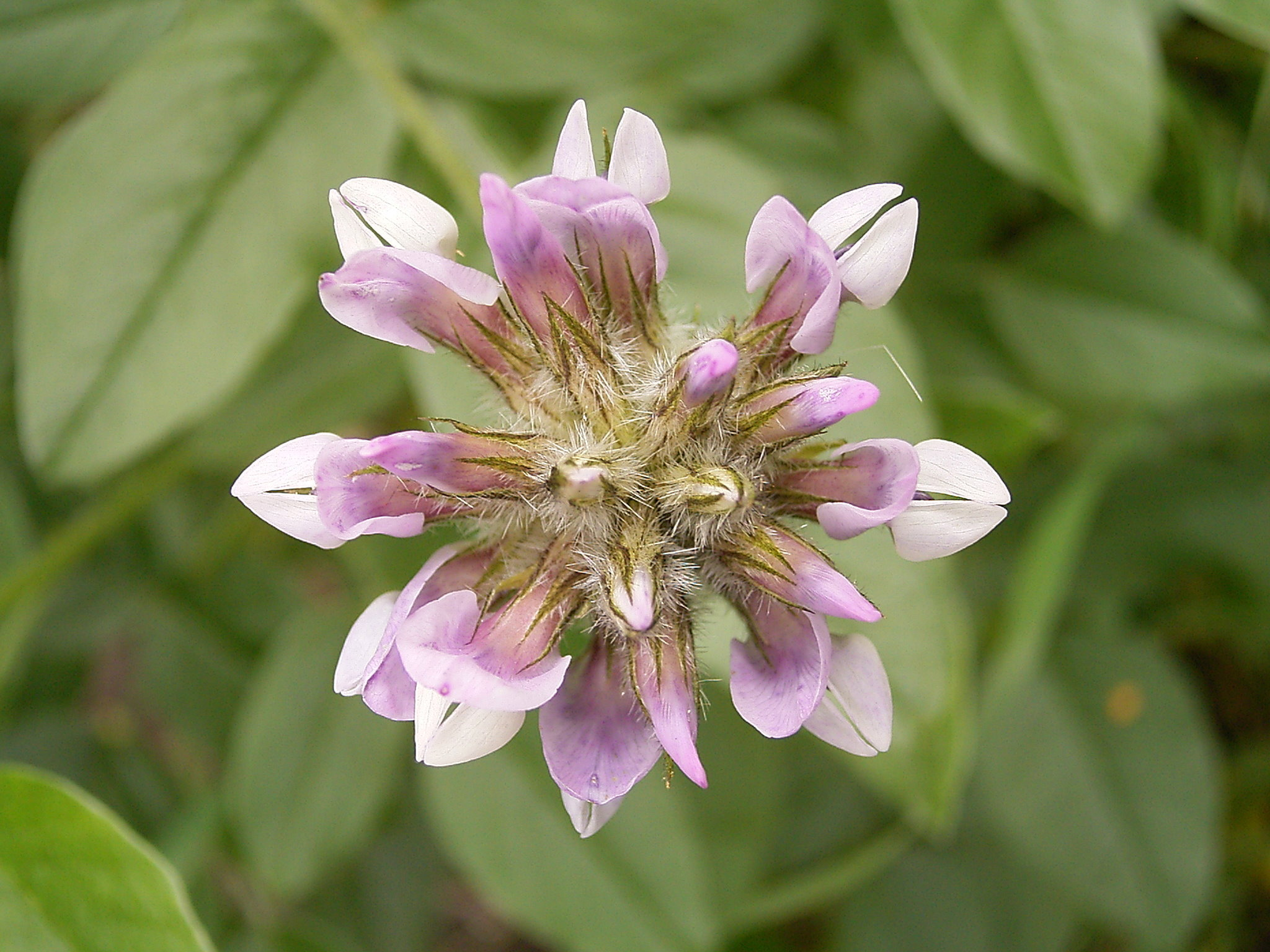

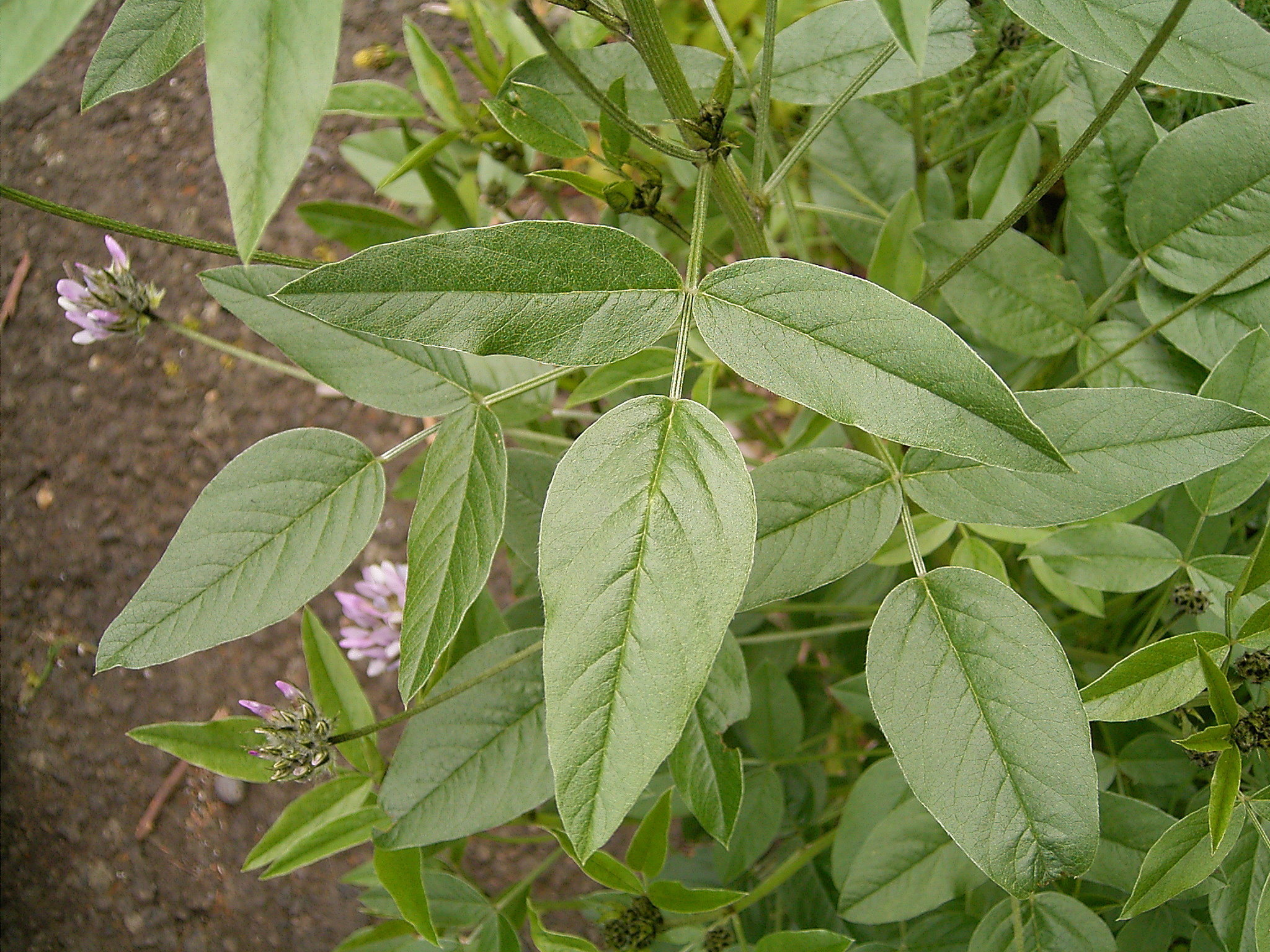

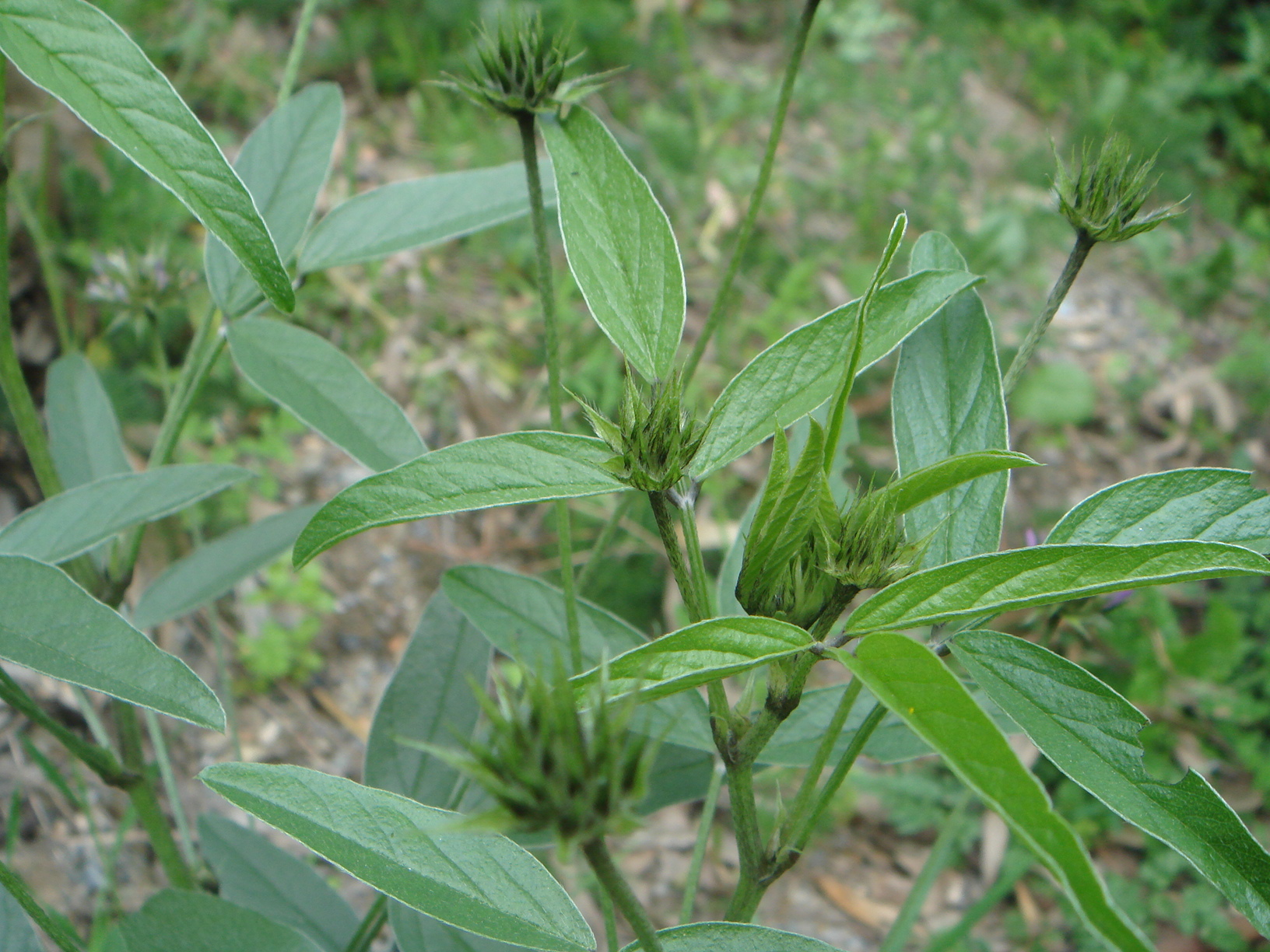

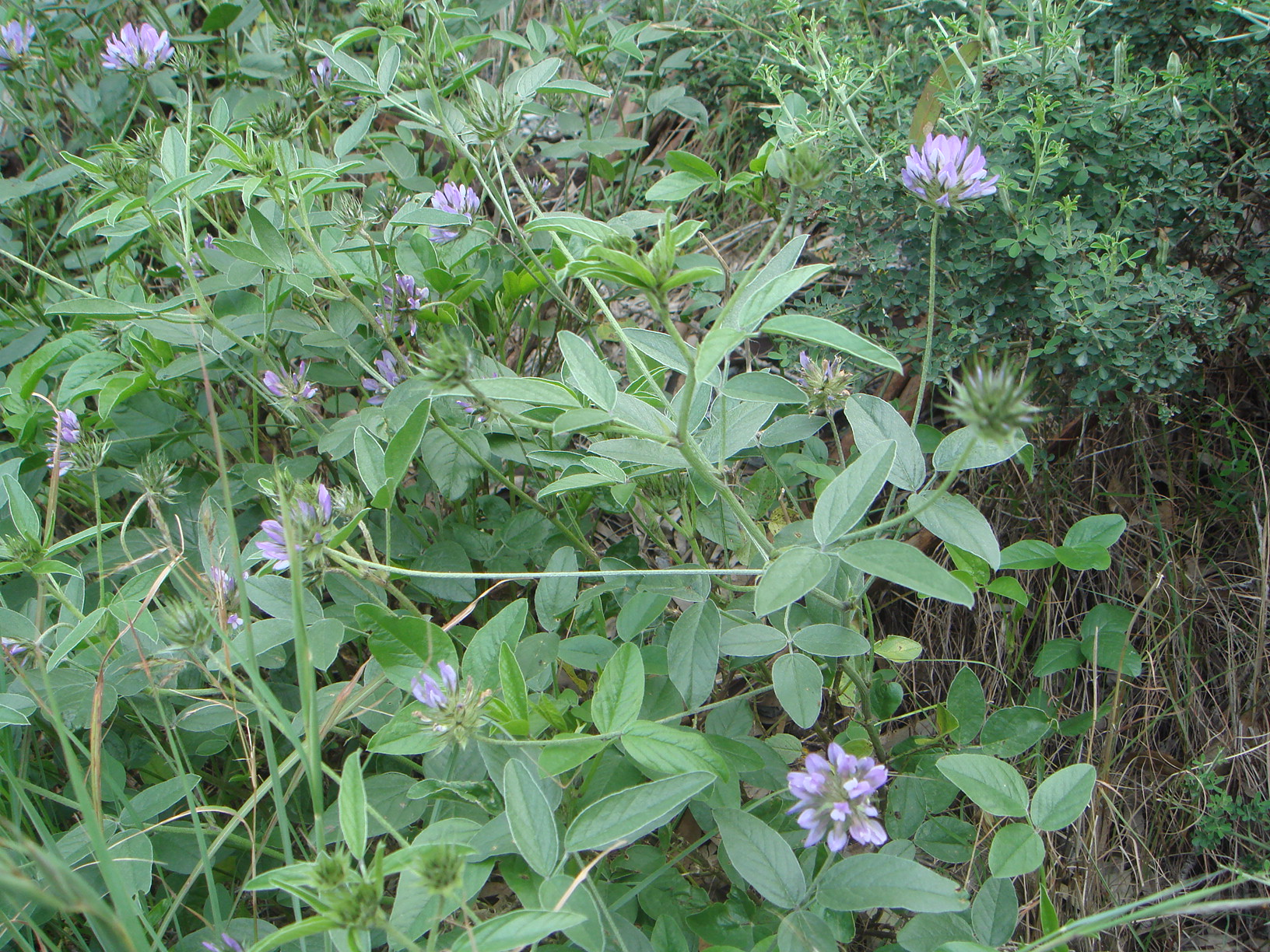

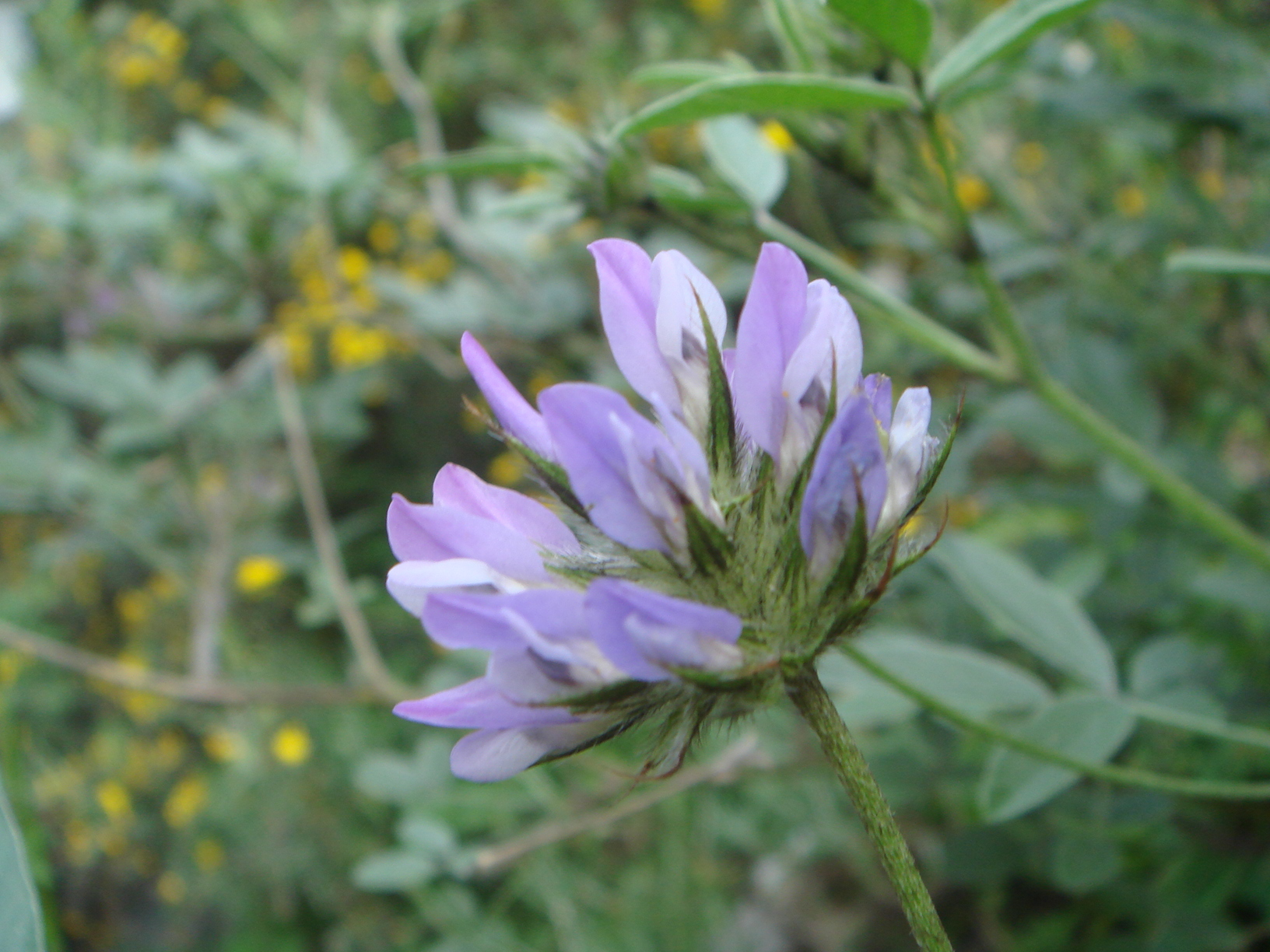

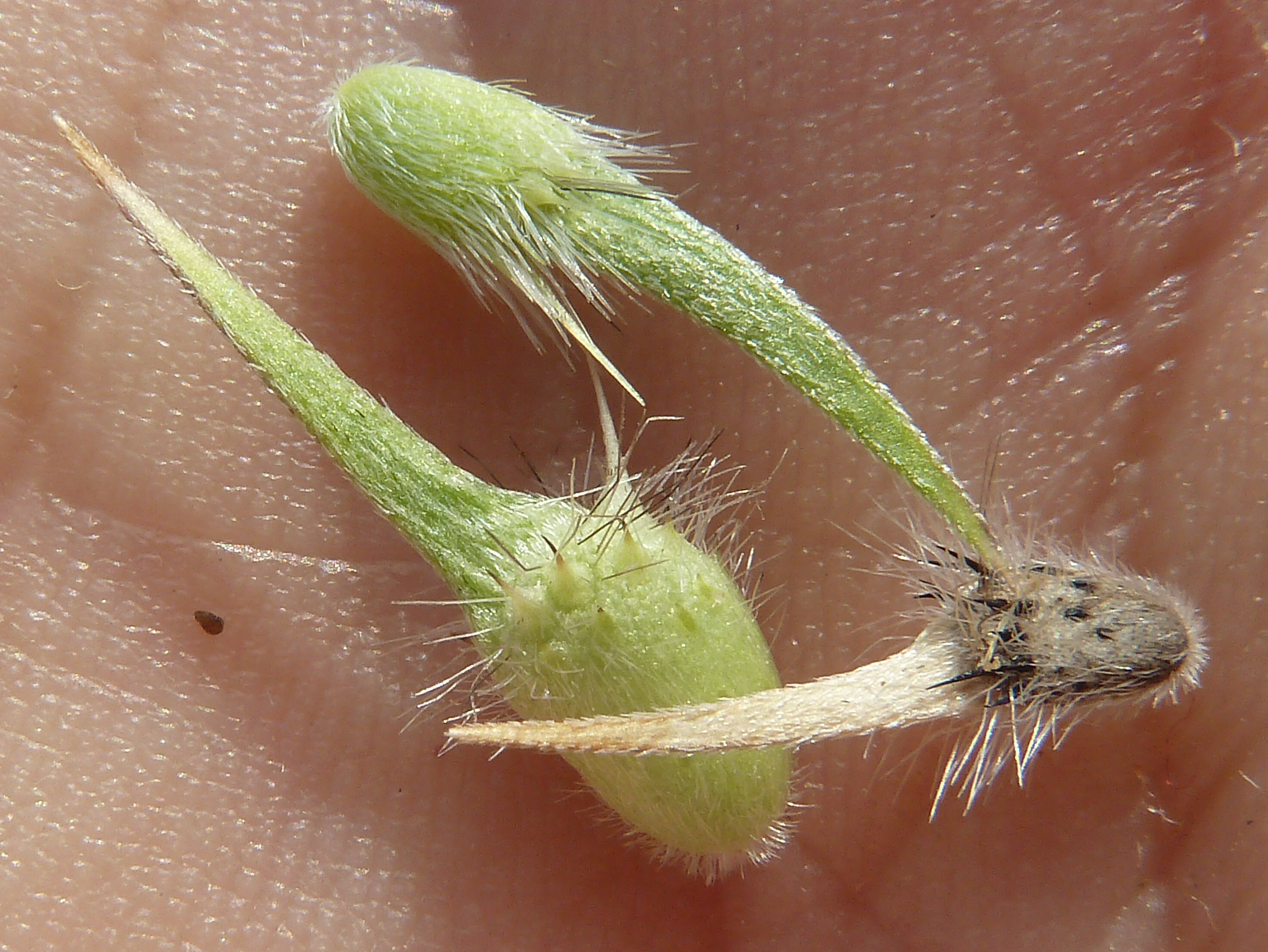

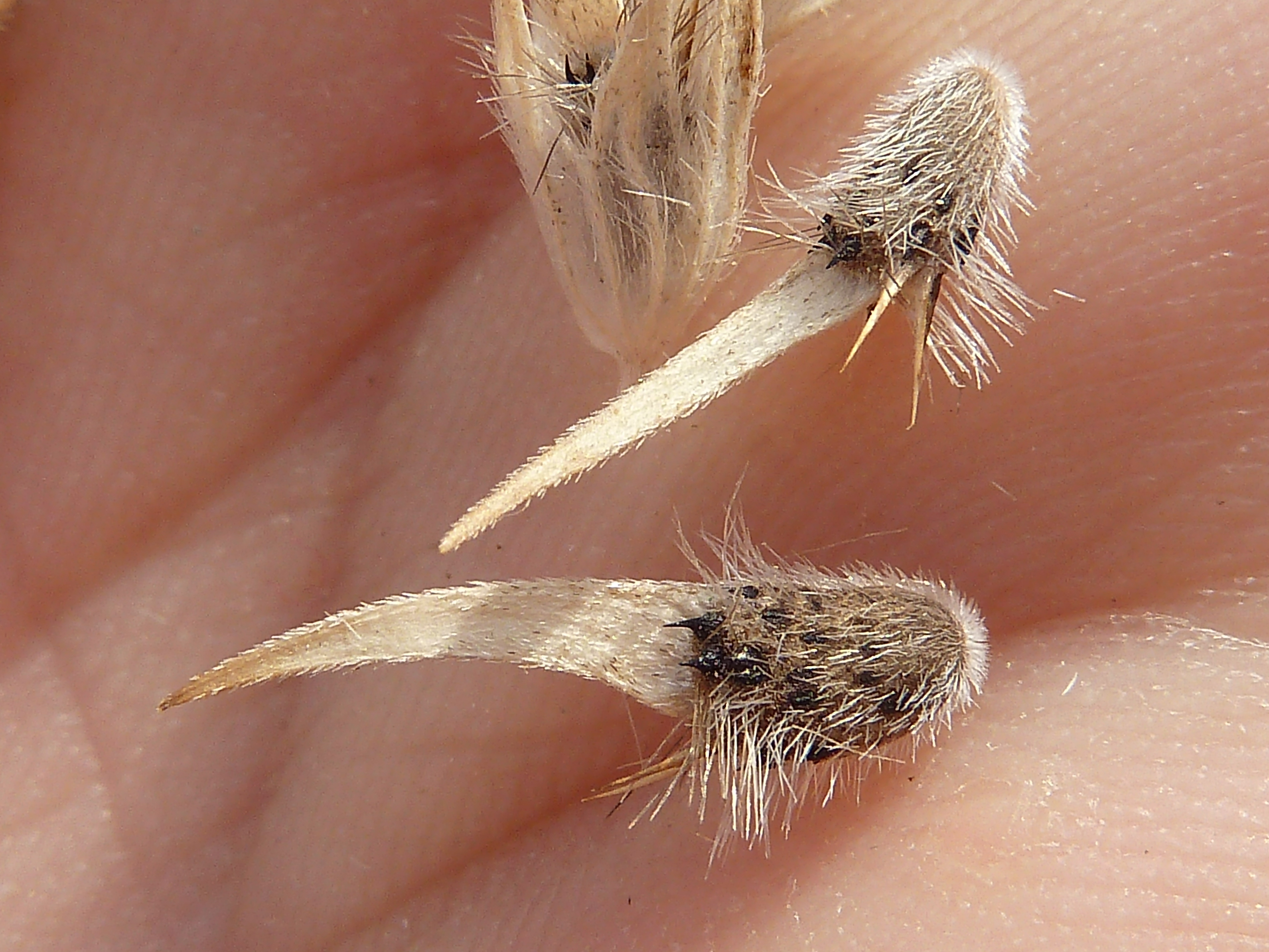

== Taxonomy ==
The Arabian pea was first legitimately described in 1753 by Carl Linnaeus in his Species Plantarum, the work which is now internationally accepted as the starting point of modern botanical nomenclature, and he called it Psoralea bituminosa. Philipp Conrad Fabricius described the genus Bituminaria in 1759, that was suggested by Lorenz Heister earlier, but without a proper description. In 1787, Friedrich Kasimir Medikus described a woody form as Asphalthium frutescens and a herbaceous form as Asphalthium herbaceum. Jules Pierre Fourreau considered that Linnaeus was the earliest and he made the new combination Asphalthium bituminosum in 1868. When Charles Howard Stirton revised some of the Papilionoideae of southern Africa in 1981, he reassigned many species that had been included in Psoralea to several new genera, including the Arabian pea. He considered Asphalthium a later synonym for Bituminaria and therefore created the new combination Bituminaria bituminosa.

== See also ==
- List of native plants of Palestine (A-B)
- Orto Botanico di Montemarcello near Ameglia, Province of La Spezia, Liguria, Italy
