= Sidney Musher =

American chemist

Sidney Musher (1905–1990) was an American chemist.

== Biography ==
Musher studied at Johns Hopkins University. During his career, he worked for companies such as Van Camp's, Cooper Laboratories and founded Aveeno.

Musher was an advocate for technological development in Israel. He helped establish institutes such as the Robert Szold Institute for Applied Science and Technology and the Israel Research and Development Corporation.

In 1974, Musher established a visiting lectureship at Hebrew University.

Among the recognitions he received include, Ben Gurion Award in 1988 by Ben Gurion University and an honorary doctoral degree awarded by the Hebrew University in 1990.

A building at Weizmann Institute of Science is named after him.

He was a son-in-law of Rabbi Mordechai Kaplan, founder of the Reconstructionist Judaism, and father of infectious diseases expert Dr. Daniel Musher.
