= Glycyrrhizol =

Glycyrrhizol A
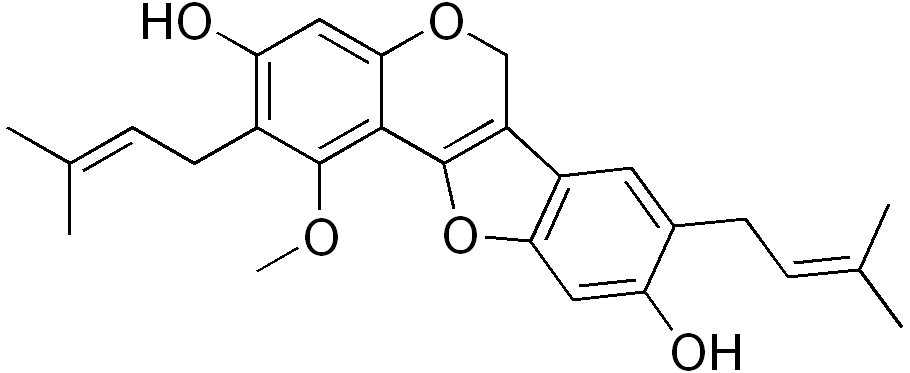

Names
- Preferred IUPAC name 1-Methoxy-2,8-bis(3-methylbut-2-en-1-yl)-6H-[1]benzofuro[3,2-c][1]benzopyran-3,9-diol

Identifiers
CAS Number	877373-00-7
3D model (JSmol)	Interactive image
ChEBI	CHEBI:65976
ChEMBL	ChEMBL522282
ChemSpider	9721048
PubChem CID	11546269
UNII	84L7S5MVN5
CompTox Dashboard (EPA)	DTXSID50468358
- InChI: InChI=1S/C26H28O5/c1-14(2)6-8-16-10-18-19-13-30-23-12-21(28)17(9-7-15(3)4)25(29-5)24(23)26(19)31-22(18)11-20(16)27/h6-7,10-12,27-28H,8-9,13H2,1-5H3 Key: CBPFOSMNDISZLV-UHFFFAOYSA-N; InChI=1/C26H28O5/c1-14(2)6-8-16-10-18-19-13-30-23-12-21(28)17(9-7-15(3)4)25(29-5)24(23)26(19)31-22(18)11-20(16)27/h6-7,10-12,27-28H,8-9,13H2,1-5H3 Key: CBPFOSMNDISZLV-UHFFFAOYAJ
- SMILES: o2c1c(cc(c(O)c1)C\C=C(/C)C)c3c2c4c(OC)c(c(O)cc4OC3)C\C=C(/C)C

Properties
Chemical formula	C_{26}H_{28}O_{5}
Molar mass	420.50 g/mol
- Except where otherwise noted, data are given for materials in their standard state (at 25 °C [77 °F], 100 kPa). verify (what is ?) Infobox references

Glycyrrhizol A is a prenylated pterocarpan and an isoflavonoid derivative. It is a compound isolated from the root of the Chinese licorice plant (Glycyrrhiza uralensis).

It may has in vitro antibacterial properties. In one study, the strongest antibacterial activity was observed against Streptococcus mutans, an organism known to cause tooth decay in humans.
