= Orto Botanico di Montemarcello =

Botanical garden in Italy

Coordinates: 44°04′N 9°57′E

The Orto Botanico di Montemarcello is a nature preserve and botanical garden located within the Parco Naturale Regionale di Montemarcello-Magra, near Ameglia, Province of La Spezia, Liguria, Italy.

The garden stands atop Mount Murlo (365 m) within the Caprione promontory, hills dividing the gulf of La Spezia from the Magra river plain. It contains plants indigenous to the region, including Arbutus unedo, Phillyrea latifolia, Pinus halepensis, Pistacia lentiscus, Rhamnus alaternus, Quercus cerris, Quercus ilex, Quercus pubescens, as well as Psoralea bituminosa, Ruta angustifolia, and Thymus vulgaris.

== See also ==
- List of botanical gardens in Italy
