= Danielone =

- Chemical structure of danielone

Names
- Preferred IUPAC name 2-Hydroxy-1-(4-hydroxy-3,5-dimethoxyphenyl)ethan-1-one
- Other names: α-Hydroxyacetosyringone; 3',5'-Dimethoxy-4'-hydroxy-(2-hydroxy)acetophenone

Identifiers
CAS Number	90426-22-5
3D model (JSmol)	Interactive image
ChEBI	CHEBI:4316
ChemSpider	128934
PubChem CID	146167
UNII	ST766K7C8F
CompTox Dashboard (EPA)	DTXSID00238169
- InChI: InChI=1S/C10H12O5/c1-14-8-3-6(7(12)5-11)4-9(15-2)10(8)13/h3-4,11,13H,5H2,1-2H3 Key: ZTBAPEIDNUHRNC-UHFFFAOYSA-N; InChI=1/C10H12O5/c1-14-8-3-6(7(12)5-11)4-9(15-2)10(8)13/h3-4,11,13H,5H2,1-2H3 Key: ZTBAPEIDNUHRNC-UHFFFAOYAI
- SMILES: COC1=CC(=CC(=C1O)OC)C(=O)CO

Properties
Chemical formula	C_{10}H_{12}O_{5}
Molar mass	212.201 g·mol^{−1}
- Except where otherwise noted, data are given for materials in their standard state (at 25 °C [77 °F], 100 kPa). verify (what is ?) Infobox references

Danielone is a phytoalexin found in the papaya fruit. This compound showed high antifungal activity against Colletotrichum gloesporioides, a pathogenic fungus of papaya. A laboratory synthesis of danielone has been reported.
