= Ent-sandaracopimaradiene synthase =

Class of enzymes

ent-sandaracopimaradiene synthase

Identifiers
- EC no.: 4.2.3.29

Databases
- IntEnz: IntEnz view
- BRENDA: BRENDA entry
- ExPASy: NiceZyme view
- KEGG: KEGG entry
- MetaCyc: metabolic pathway
- PRIAM: profile
- PDB structures: RCSB PDB PDBe PDBsum
Search
- PMC: articles
- PubMed: articles
- NCBI: proteins

ent-Sandaracopimaradiene synthase (EC 4.2.3.29, OsKS10, ent-sandaracopimara-8(14),15-diene synthase) is an enzyme with systematic name ent-copalyl-diphosphate diphosphate-lyase [ent-sandaracopimara-8(14),15-diene-forming]. This enzyme catalyses the following chemical reaction

ent-copalyl diphosphate $\rightleftharpoons$ ent-sandaracopimara-8(14),15-diene + diphosphate

ent-Sandaracopimaradiene is a precursor of the rice oryzalexins A-F.
