= Salvestrol =

Dietary supplement

A salvestrol is a dietary phytochemical. The name "salvestrols" was coined by medicinal chemist Gerard A. Potter. "Salvestrol" has been trademarked and is used to market dietary supplements and other products. Some salvestrol-based products contain extracts from blackcurrant, blueberry, strawberry, and tangerine peel.

Salvesterols have been marketed as dietary supplements promoted for their supposed anti-cancer abilities. According to Andy Lewis, publisher of The Quackometer Blog, "there is no evidence to suggest that these plant-derived chemicals have any positive effect on reducing cancer risk when taken in supplement form or for forming any part of a medical regime for cancer sufferers".
