= Aphidicolan-16beta-ol synthase =

Aphidicolan-16β-ol synthase

Identifiers
- EC no.: 4.2.3.42

Databases
- IntEnz: IntEnz view
- BRENDA: BRENDA entry
- ExPASy: NiceZyme view
- KEGG: KEGG entry
- MetaCyc: metabolic pathway
- PRIAM: profile
- PDB structures: RCSB PDB PDBe PDBsum
Search
- PMC: articles
- PubMed: articles
- NCBI: proteins

Aphidicolan-16β-ol synthase (EC 4.2.3.42, PbACS) is an enzyme with systematic name 9α-copalyl-diphosphate diphosphate-lyase (aphidicolan-16β-ol-forming). This enzyme catalyses the following chemical reaction

9α-copalyl diphosphate + H_{2}O $\rightleftharpoons$ aphidicolan-16β-ol + diphosphate

This is a bifunctional enzyme, which also has EC 5.5.1.14 activity.
