= Ent-isokaurene synthase =

ent-isokaurene synthase

Identifiers
- EC no.: 4.2.3.103

Databases
- IntEnz: IntEnz view
- BRENDA: BRENDA entry
- ExPASy: NiceZyme view
- KEGG: KEGG entry
- MetaCyc: metabolic pathway
- PRIAM: profile
- PDB structures: RCSB PDB PDBe PDBsum
Search
- PMC: articles
- PubMed: articles
- NCBI: proteins

ent-Isokaurene synthase (EC 4.2.3.103, OsKSL5i, OsKSL6) is an enzyme with systematic name ent-copalyl-diphosphate diphosphate-lyase (cyclizing, ent-isokaurene-forming). This enzyme catalyses the following chemical reaction

ent-copalyl diphosphate $\rightleftharpoons$ ent-isokaurene + diphosphate

Two enzymes of the rice sub-species Oryza sativa ssp. indica, OsKSL5 and OsKSL6, produce ent-isokaurene.
