= 2'-Hydroxyisoflavone reductase =

Class of enzymes

2'-hydroxyisoflavone reductase

Identifiers
- EC no.: 1.3.1.45
- CAS no.: 128449-69-4

Databases
- IntEnz: IntEnz view
- BRENDA: BRENDA entry
- ExPASy: NiceZyme view
- KEGG: KEGG entry
- MetaCyc: metabolic pathway
- PRIAM: profile
- PDB structures: RCSB PDB PDBe PDBsum
- Gene Ontology: AmiGO / QuickGO
Search
- PMC: articles
- PubMed: articles
- NCBI: proteins

In enzymology, 2'-hydroxyisoflavone reductase (EC 1.3.1.45) is an enzyme that catalyzes the chemical reaction

2'-hydroxyformononetin
+ NADPH
H^{+}
H^{+}
vestitone
+ NADP^{+}

The three substrates of this enzyme are 2'-hydroxyformononetin, reduced nicotinamide adenine dinucleotide phosphate (NADPH), and a proton. Its products are vestitone and NADP^{+}.

This enzyme belongs to the family of oxidoreductases, specifically those acting on the CH-CH group of donor with NAD+ or NADP+ as acceptor. The systematic name of this enzyme class is vestitone:NADP+ oxidoreductase. Other names in common use include NADPH:2'-hydroxyisoflavone oxidoreductase, isoflavone reductase, and 2',7-dihydroxy-4',5'-methylenedioxyisoflavone reductase.
