= Ent-pimara-8(14),15-diene synthase =

Class of enzymes

ent-pimara-8(14),15-diene synthase

Identifiers
- EC no.: 4.2.3.30

Databases
- IntEnz: IntEnz view
- BRENDA: BRENDA entry
- ExPASy: NiceZyme view
- KEGG: KEGG entry
- MetaCyc: metabolic pathway
- PRIAM: profile
- PDB structures: RCSB PDB PDBe PDBsum
Search
- PMC: articles
- PubMed: articles
- NCBI: proteins

ent-Pimara-8(14),15-diene synthase (EC 4.2.3.30, OsKS5) is an enzyme with systematic name ent-copalyl-diphosphate diphosphate-lyase [ent-pimara-8(14),15-diene-forming]. This enzyme catalyses the following chemical reaction

ent-copalyl diphosphate $\rightleftharpoons$ ent-pimara-8(14),15-diene + diphosphate

This diterpene cyclase produces only ent-pimara-8(14),15-diene.
