= Allixin =

Names
- Preferred IUPAC name 3-Hydroxy-5-methoxy-6-methyl-2-pentyl-4H-pyran-4-one

Identifiers
| CAS Number | 125263-70-9 |
| 3D model (JSmol) | Interactive image |
| ChemSpider | 77892 |
| PubChem CID | 86374 |
| UNII | 851A356OPF |
| CompTox Dashboard (EPA) | DTXSID00154719 |
- InChI: InChI=1S/C12H18O4/c1-4-5-6-7-9-10(13)11(14)12(15-3)8(2)16-9/h13H,4-7H2,1-3H3 Key: OHRPDNHRQKOLGN-UHFFFAOYSA-N; InChI=1S/C12H18O4/c1-4-5-6-7-9-10(13)11(14)12(15-3)8(2)16-9/h13H,4-7H2,1-3H3
- SMILES: O=C1C(/OC)=C(\O/C(=C1/O)CCCCC)C

Properties
| Chemical formula | C_{12}H_{18}O_{4} |
| Molar mass | 226.272 g·mol^{−1} |
- Except where otherwise noted, data are given for materials in their standard state (at 25 °C [77 °F], 100 kPa). verify (what is ?) Infobox references

Allixin is a phytoalexin found in garlic (Allium sativum) bulbs. It was first isolated and characterized in 1989. When garlic is stored for long periods of time, it can form visible accumulations of crystalline allixin on its surface, particularly in areas where tissue has become necrotic. After 2 years of storage, the amount of allixin accumulated can approach 1% of the dry weight of the cloves. Since allixin has weak antimicrobial activity, these high concentrations are thought to be produced by the garlic bulb to protect itself from further damage from microorganisms.

Since allixin is found in high concentrations in garlic, there has been scientific interest in determining if it is responsible for any of the known health benefits of garlic. As a result of ongoing research, a variety of biological activities have been attributed to allixin. Pharmaceutical drug discovery research based on derivatives of allixin has followed.

== Laboratory synthesis ==
Two laboratory syntheses of allixin have been developed. In the first method, reported in 1997, allixin was synthesized in 22 steps starting from D-mannose. A shorter synthesis was developed in 1998 which involved only 5 steps, starting from 5-methylfurfural.

== Biological activities ==
In in vitro studies, allixin demonstrates neurotrophic activity, but at high concentrations it has cytotoxic effects. Simple chemical analogs of allixin were found to have more potent neurotrophic activity, but without the cytotoxic effects. Allixin may therefore be a useful starting point for the development of pharmaceutical drugs for the treatment of neurodegenerative disorders or for neuronal regeneration in the brain.

Pharmacological studies have demonstrated that allixin exerts an anti-promoting activity against skin tumors induced by the chemical 12-O-tetradecanoylphorbol-13-acetate (TPA) and an inhibitory effect on aflatoxin B1-induced mutagenesis. Allixin may therefore be responsible, at least in part, for the tumor-preventative effects of garlic extract.

Allixin has also been shown to have a radical scavenging effect.

== Metal complexes ==
Metal complexes with allixin have been shown to have beneficial pharmacological effects in animal models of diabetes. A complex with vanadium, bis(allixinato)oxovanadium(IV), is a potent anti-diabetic agent. In studies in streptozotocin-induced diabetic mice, this vanadium complex was shown to be an insulin mimetic with hypoglycemic effects. Similarly, a zinc-allixin complex, bis(allixinato)zinc(II), shows the same insulin mimetic effects. The mechanism of action by which these complexes regulate insulin signaling pathways is unclear.

Bis(allixinato)oxovanadium(IV)

Bis(allixinato)zinc(II)
