= Stemod-13(17)-ene synthase =

Identifiers
- EC no.: 4.2.3.34

Databases
- IntEnz: IntEnz view
- BRENDA: BRENDA entry
- ExPASy: NiceZyme view
- KEGG: KEGG entry
- MetaCyc: metabolic pathway
- PRIAM: profile
- PDB structures: RCSB PDB PDBe PDBsum
Search
- PMC: articles
- PubMed: articles
- NCBI: proteins

Stemod-13(17)-ene synthase (EC 4.2.3.34, OsKSL11, stemodene synthase) is an enzyme with systematic name 9α-copalyl-diphosphate diphosphate-lyase (stemod-13(17)-ene-forming). This enzyme catalyses the following chemical reaction

9alpha-copalyl diphosphate $\rightleftharpoons$ stemod-13(17)-ene + diphosphate

This enzyme takes part in the biosynthesis of the stemodane family of diterpenoid secondary metabolites.
