= Ent-pimara-9(11),15-diene synthase =

Class of enzymes

ent-pimara-9(11),15-diene synthase

Identifiers
- EC no.: 4.2.3.31

Databases
- IntEnz: IntEnz view
- BRENDA: BRENDA entry
- ExPASy: NiceZyme view
- KEGG: KEGG entry
- MetaCyc: metabolic pathway
- PRIAM: profile
- PDB structures: RCSB PDB PDBe PDBsum
Search
- PMC: articles
- PubMed: articles
- NCBI: proteins

ent-Pimara-9(11),15-diene synthase (EC 4.2.3.31, PMD synthase) is an enzyme with systematic name ent-copalyl-diphosphate diphosphate-lyase (ent-pimara-9(11),15-diene-forming). This enzyme catalyses the following chemical reaction

ent-copalyl diphosphate $\rightleftharpoons$ ent-pimara-9(11),15-diene + diphosphate

This enzyme is involved in the biosynthesis of the diterpenoid viguiepinol and requires Mg^{2+}, Co^{2+}, Zn^{2+} or Ni^{2+} for activity.
