= Labdatriene synthase =

Identifiers
- EC no.: 4.2.3.99

Databases
- IntEnz: IntEnz view
- BRENDA: BRENDA entry
- ExPASy: NiceZyme view
- KEGG: KEGG entry
- MetaCyc: metabolic pathway
- PRIAM: profile
- PDB structures: RCSB PDB PDBe PDBsum
Search
- PMC: articles
- PubMed: articles
- NCBI: proteins

Labdatriene synthase (EC 4.2.3.99, OsKSL10 (gene)) is an enzyme with systematic name 9α-copalyl-diphosphate diphosphate-lyase ((12E)-9α-labda-8(17),12,14-triene-forming). This enzyme catalyses the following chemical reaction

9α-copalyl diphosphate $\rightleftharpoons$ (12E)-9α-labda-8(17),12,14-triene + diphosphate

The enzyme from rice (Oryza sativa) also produces ent-sandaracopimara-8(14),15-diene from ent-copalyl diphosphate.
