= Erythrina subumbrans =

Scientific classification
- Kingdom: Plantae
- Clade: Embryophytes
- Clade: Tracheophytes
- Clade: Spermatophytes
- Clade: Angiosperms
- Clade: Eudicots
- Clade: Rosids
- Order: Fabales
- Family: Fabaceae
- Subfamily: Faboideae
- Genus: Erythrina
- Species: E. subumbrans

Binomial name
- Erythrina subumbrans (Hassk.) Merr.

Synonyms
- Hypaphorus subumbrans Hassk.; Erythrina lithosperma Miq.

Species of tree

Erythrina subumbrans, common names tton tong or dadap, is a flowering plant species in the genus Erythrina.

The pterocarpans phaseolin, erybraedins A and B are found in the stems of E. subumbrans.
