= Syn-pimara-7,15-diene synthase =

syn-pimara-7,15-diene synthase

Identifiers
- EC no.: 4.2.3.35

Databases
- IntEnz: IntEnz view
- BRENDA: BRENDA entry
- ExPASy: NiceZyme view
- KEGG: KEGG entry
- MetaCyc: metabolic pathway
- PRIAM: profile
- PDB structures: RCSB PDB PDBe PDBsum
Search
- PMC: articles
- PubMed: articles
- NCBI: proteins

syn-Pimara-7,15-diene synthase (EC 4.2.3.35, 9β-pimara-7,15-diene synthase, OsDTS2, OsKS4) is an enzyme with systematic name 9α-copalyl-diphosphate diphosphate-lyase (9β-pimara-7,15-diene-forming). This enzyme catalyses the following chemical reaction

9α-copalyl diphosphate $\rightleftharpoons$ 9β-pimara-7,15-diene + diphosphate

This enzyme is a class I terpene synthase.
