= Avenanthramide =

Type of alkaloid

Structures of avenanthramides

Avenanthramides (anthranilic acid amides, formerly called "avenalumins") are a group of phenolic alkaloids found mainly in oats (Avena sativa), but also present in white cabbage butterfly eggs (Pieris brassicae and P. rapae), and in fungus-infected carnation (Dianthus caryophyllus). A number of studies demonstrate that these natural products have anti-inflammatory, antioxidant, anti-itch, anti-irritant, and antiatherogenic activities. Oat kernel extracts with standardized levels of avenanthramides are used for skin, hair, baby, and sun care products. The name avenanthramides was coined by Collins when he reported the presence of these compounds in oat kernels. It was later found that three avenanthramides were the open-ring amides of avenalumins I, II, and III, which were previously reported as oat phytoalexins by Mayama and co-workers.

== History ==
Oats have been used for personal care purposes since antiquity. Indeed, wild oats (Avena sativa) were used in skin care in Egypt and the Arabian Peninsula 2000 BC. Oat baths were a common treatment of insomnia, anxiety, and skin diseases such as eczema and burns. In Roman times, their use as a medication for dermatological conditions was reported by Pliny, Columella, and Theophrastus. In the 19th century, oatmeal baths were often used to treat many cutaneous conditions, especially pruritic inflammatory eruptions. In the 1930s, the literature provided further evidence about the cleansing action of oats along with their ability to relieve itching and protect skin.

=== Colloidal oatmeal ===
In 2003, colloidal oatmeal was officially approved as a skin protectant by the FDA. However, little thought had been given to the active ingredient in oats responsible for the anti-inflammatory effect until more attention was paid to avenanthramides, which were first isolated and characterized in the 1980s by Collins.

Since then, many congeners have been characterized and purified, and it is known that avenanthramides have antioxidant, anti-inflammatory, and anti-atherosclerotic properties, and may be used as a treatment for people with inflammatory, allergy, or cardiovascular diseases. In 1999 studies made by Tufts University showed that avenanthramides are bioavailable and remain bioactive in humans after consumption. More recent studies made by the University of Minnesota showed that the antioxidant and anti-inflammatory activities can be increased through the consumption of 0.4 to 9.2 mg/day of avenanthramides over eight weeks. The International Nomenclature of Cosmetic Ingredients (INCI) originally referred to an oat extract with a standardized level of avenanthramides as "Avena sativa kernel extract," but recently they have also accepted the INCI name "avenanthramides" to describe an extract containing 80% of these oat phenolic alkaloids.

== Function in Avena sativa ==
A. sativa produces avenanthramides as defensive phytoalexins against infiltration by fungal plant pathogens. They were discovered as defensive chemicals especially concentrated in lesions of Puccinia coronata var. avenae f. sp. avenae (and at that time named "avenalumins").

== Medical and personal care uses ==
=== Anti-inflammatory and anti-itch activity ===
Studies made by Sur (2008) provide evidence that avenanthramides significantly reduce the inflammatory response. Inflammation is a complex and self-protection reaction that occurs in the body against foreign substance, cell damage, infections, and pathogens. The inflammatory responses are controlled through a group called cytokines that is produced by the inflammatory cells. Furthermore, the expression of cytokines is regulated through inhibition of nuclear transcription factor kappa B (NF-κB). Many studies have demonstrated that avenanthramides can reduce the production of pro-inflammatory cytokines such as IL-6, IL-8, and MCP-1 by inhibiting NF-κB activation that is responsible for activating the genes of inflammatory response. Thus, these oat polyphenols mediate the decrease of inflammation by inhibiting the cytokine release. In addition, it was found that avenanthramides inhibit neurogenic inflammation, which is defined as an inflammation triggered by the nervous system that causes vasodilation, edema, warmth, and hypersensitivity. Also, avenanthramides significantly reduce the itching response, and its efficiency is comparable to the anti-itch effect produced by hydrocortisone.

==== Redness reduction ====
Avenanthramides have effective antihistaminic activity; they significantly reduce itch and redness compared with untreated areas.

==== Suggested mechanism of action ====
According to Sur (2008), the anti-inflammatory effect of the avenanthramides is due to the inhibition of the NF-κB activation in NF-κB dependent cytokine. Nuclear factor-kappa β (NF-κB) is responsible for regulating the transcription of DNA and participates in the activation of genes related to inflammatory and immune responses. Consequently, suppressing the NF-κB limits the proliferation of cancer cells and reduces the level of inflammation. Avenanthramides are able to inhibit the release of inflammatory cytokines that are present in pruritic skin diseases that cause itchiness. In addition, its anti-inflammatory activity may prevent the vicious itch-scratch cycle and reduce the scratching-induced secondary inflammation that often occur in atopic dermatitis, preventing the destruction of skin barrier. Avenanthramides also have a chemical structure similar to the drug tranilast, which has anti-histaminic action. The anti-itch activity of avenanthramides may be associated with the inhibition of histamine response. Taken together, these results show the effect of avenanthramides as powerful anti-inflammatory agents and their importance in dermatologic applications.

=== Antioxidant activity ===
Avenanthramides are known to have potent antioxidant activity, acting primarily by donating a hydrogen atom to a radical. An antioxidant is “any substance that, when present at low concentrations compared to those of an oxidisable substrate, significantly delays or prevents oxidation of that substrate” ( Halliwell, 1990). These phytochemicals are able to combat the oxidative stress present in the body that is responsible for causing cancer and cardiovascular disease. Among the avenanthramides, there are different antioxidant capacities, where C has the highest capacity, followed by B and A.

==== Dietary supplement ====
Avenanthramides extracted from oats show potent antioxidant properties in vitro and in vivo, and according to studies made by Dimberg (1992), its antioxidant activity is many times greater than other antioxidants such as caffeic acid and vanillin. Aven-C is one of the most significant avenanthramides present in the oats, and it is responsible for oats' antioxidant activity. The effects of the avenanthramide-enriched extract of oats has been investigated in animals, and a diet of 20 mg avenanthramide per kilogram body weight in rats has been shown to increase the superoxide dismutase (SOD) activity in skeletal muscle, liver, and kidneys. Also, a diet based on avenanthramides enhances glutathione peroxidase activity in heart and skeletal muscles, protecting the organism from oxidative damages.

== Nomenclature ==
Avenanthramides consist of conjugates of one of three phenylpropanoids (p-coumaric, ferulic, or caffeic acid) and anthranilic acid (or a hydroxylated and/or methoxylated derivative of anthranilic acid). Collins and Dimberg have used different systems of nomenclature to describe the Avenanthramides in their publications. Collins assigned a system that classifies avenanthramides using alphabetic descriptors, while Dimberg assigned upper case letters to the anthranilate derivate and lower case to the accompanying phenylpropanoid, such as “c” for caffeic acid, “f” for ferulic acid, or “p” for anthranilic acid p-coumaric acid. Later, Dimberg's system was modified to use a numeric descriptor for the anthranilic acid. The following avenanthramides are most abundant in oats: avenanthramide A (also called 2p, AF-1 or Bp), avenanthramide B (also called 2f, AF-2 or Bf), avenanthramide C (also called 2c, AF-6 or Bc), avenanthramide O (also called 2pd), avenanthramide P (also called 2fd), and avenanthramide Q (also called 2 cd).

Structures of avenanthramides

Collins	Dimberg's original	Dimberg's modified	n	R^{1}	R^{2}	R^{3}
A	Bp	2p	1	H	H	OH
B	Bf	2f	1	OCH_{3}	H	OH
C	Bc	2c	1	OH	H	OH
O		2p_{d}	2	H	H	OH
P		2f_{d}	2	OCH_{3}	H	OH

== Biosynthesis ==
There is evidence that the amount of avenanthramides found in the grains is related to genotype, environment, crop year and location, and tissue (Matsukawa et al., 2000). The environmental factors are not clearly known, but it is believed that lower levels of avenanthramides are produced in oats when they are grown in a dry environment, which disfavors crown rust, a kind of fungus that has been shown to stimulate avenanthramides production in oats grains.

== Chemical stability ==
=== pH ===
Avenanthramides are not all sensitive to pH and temperature. This was well illustrated in a study conducted on avenanthramides A, B and C. In this study it was found that avenanthramide A (2p) concentration was essentially unchanged in sodium phosphate buffer after three hours at either room temperature or at 95 °C. Avenanthramides B (2f) appeared to be more sensitive to the higher temperature at pH 7 and 12. Avenanthramides C (2c) underwent chemical reorganization at pH 12 at both temperatures and diminished by more than 85% at 95 °C, even at pH 7 (Dimberg et al., 2001).

=== UV ===
Avenanthramides are also affected by ultra-violet (UV) light. Dimberg found that the three avenanthramides tested (A, B, and C) remained in the trans conformation after 18 hours of exposure to UV light at 254 nm. On the other hand, Collins reported that the avenanthramides isomerize upon exposure to daylight or UV light.

== Synthetic avenanthramides ==
Avenanthramides can be artificially synthesized. Avenanthramides A, B, D, and E were synthesized by Collins (1989), using chromatography methods, and adapting Bain and Smalley's procedure (1968). All four synthetic substances were identical to the ones extracted from oats.
