= Capsidiol =

Names
- IUPAC name 4α-Eremophila-9,11-diene-1β,3α-diol
- Systematic IUPAC name (1R,3R,4S,4aR,6R)-4,4a-Dimethyl-6-(prop-1-en-2-yl)-1,2,3,4,4a,5,6,7-octahydronaphthalene-1,3-diol

Identifiers
CAS Number	37208-05-2
3D model (JSmol)	Interactive image
Beilstein Reference	2331764
ChEBI	CHEBI:28283
ChemSpider	142224
ECHA InfoCard	100.247.709
KEGG	C09627
PubChem CID	161937
UNII	1O869T5P54
CompTox Dashboard (EPA)	DTXSID50190703
- InChI: InChI=1/C15H24O2/c1-9(2)11-5-6-12-14(17)7-13(16)10(3)15(12,4)8-11/h6,10-11,13-14,16-17H,1,5,7-8H2,2-4H3/t10-,11-,13-,14-,15-/m1/s1 Key: BXXSHQYDJWZXPB-OKNSCYNVBL
- SMILES: O[C@H]2/C1=C/C[C@@H](\C(=C)C)C[C@@]1([C@H](C)[C@H](O)C2)C

Properties
Chemical formula	C_{15}H_{24}O_{2}
Molar mass	236.35 g/mol
- Except where otherwise noted, data are given for materials in their standard state (at 25 °C [77 °F], 100 kPa). Infobox references

Capsidiol is a terpenoid compound that accumulates in tobacco Nicotiana tabacum and chili pepper Capsicum annuum in response to fungal infection. Capsidiol is categorized under the broad term of phytoalexin, a class of low molecular weight plant secondary metabolites that are produced during infection. Phytoalexins are also characterized as a part of a two pronged response to infection which involves a short term response consisting of production of free radicals near the site of infection and a long term response involving the production of hormones and an increase in enzymes to biosynthesize phytoalexins such as capsidiol.

== Mechanism of production ==
Capsidiol is produced in the pepper fruit Capsicum annuum or tobacco Nicotiana tabacum after infection by the oomycete water-mold Phytophthora capsici. In pepper or tobacco fields, the oomycete is soil-borne and initially infects roots, collars and lower leaves. Sporangia are moved within fields by contact with field equipment, clothing, gloves, tools etc. and initial infections spread zoospores through splashing of water from irrigation or rain. Initial responses to infection include production of radical oxygen species, including H_{2}O_{2}. Exogenous treatment with H_{2}O_{2} alone has been shown to induce capsidiol production. Capsidiol production is then increased in response to radical oxygen species production.

== Biosynthesis ==
Capsidiol is a bicyclic terpene that is biosynthetically derived from the mevalonate pathway via farnesyl pyrophosphate (FPP). The E,E-farnesyl cation is first created by the loss of pyrophosphate. Kinetic studies have indicated that turnover appears to be limited by a chemical step after the initial loss of pyrophosphate. Crystal structures of recombinant tobacco 5-epi-aristolochene synthase (TEAS), alone and also complexed with two FPP analogues have been reported and analyzed to suggest the following mechanism of biosynthesis. The E,E-farnesyl cation undergoes cyclization to form the germacryl cation. The second ring closure gives the bicyclic eudesmyl cation, which is stabilized by various dipole interactions, then H-2 migrates to C-3 producing a tertiary cation at C-2 (farnesyl numbering). Production of 5-epi-aristolochene from FPP by 5-epi-aristolochene 3-hydroxylase, a sesquiterpene cyclase, is considered the critical step in capsidiol biosynthesis. Aristolochene synthase enzymes from Penicillium roqueforti, Nicotiana tabacum have been purified and their crystal structures have been reported suggesting different stereochemistries for aristolochene. Penicillium roqueforti's enzyme appears to synthesizes aristolochene by way of (S)-germacrene A, however, the Nicotiana tabacum enzyme 5-epi-aristolochene synthase produces the diastereoisomeric product by way of (R)-germacrene A.
