= Glyceollin synthase =

Class of enzymes

Identifiers
- EC no.: 1.14.14.135

Databases
- IntEnz: IntEnz view
- BRENDA: BRENDA entry
- ExPASy: NiceZyme view
- KEGG: KEGG entry
- MetaCyc: metabolic pathway
- PRIAM: profile
- PDB structures: RCSB PDB PDBe PDBsum
Search
- PMC: articles
- PubMed: articles
- NCBI: proteins

Glyceollin synthase is an enzyme that catalyzes the last committed step in glyceollin biosynthesis. It has been classified as a cytochrome dependent monooxygenase. It cyclizes a prenyl residue in its starting materials to convert glyceollidins (I and II) into glyceollins (I - III).

This enzyme catalyzes three chemical reactions, for example:

glyceocarpin
O_{2}
H_{2}O
glyceollin II

Glyceocarpin can alternatively be converted to glyceollin III

glyceocarpin
O_{2}
H_{2}O
glyceollin III

Glyceollin synthase is a cytochrome P450 protein containing heme. It requires a partner cytochrome P450 reductase for functional expression. This uses nicotinamide adenine dinucleotide phosphate. The systematic name of this enzyme class is 2-(or 4-)dimethylallyl-(6aS,11aS)-3,6a,9-trihydroxypterocarpan,NADPH:oxygen oxidoreductase (cyclizing).

The previous enzyme in the pathway to glyceollins, trihydroxypterocarpan dimethylallyltransferase also produces the isomeric compound 4-dimethylallylglycinol. This is also a substrate for glyceollin synthase:

4-dimethylallylglycinol
O_{2}
H_{2}O
glyceollin I
