= Glycinol (pterocarpan) =

- Chemical structure of glycinol

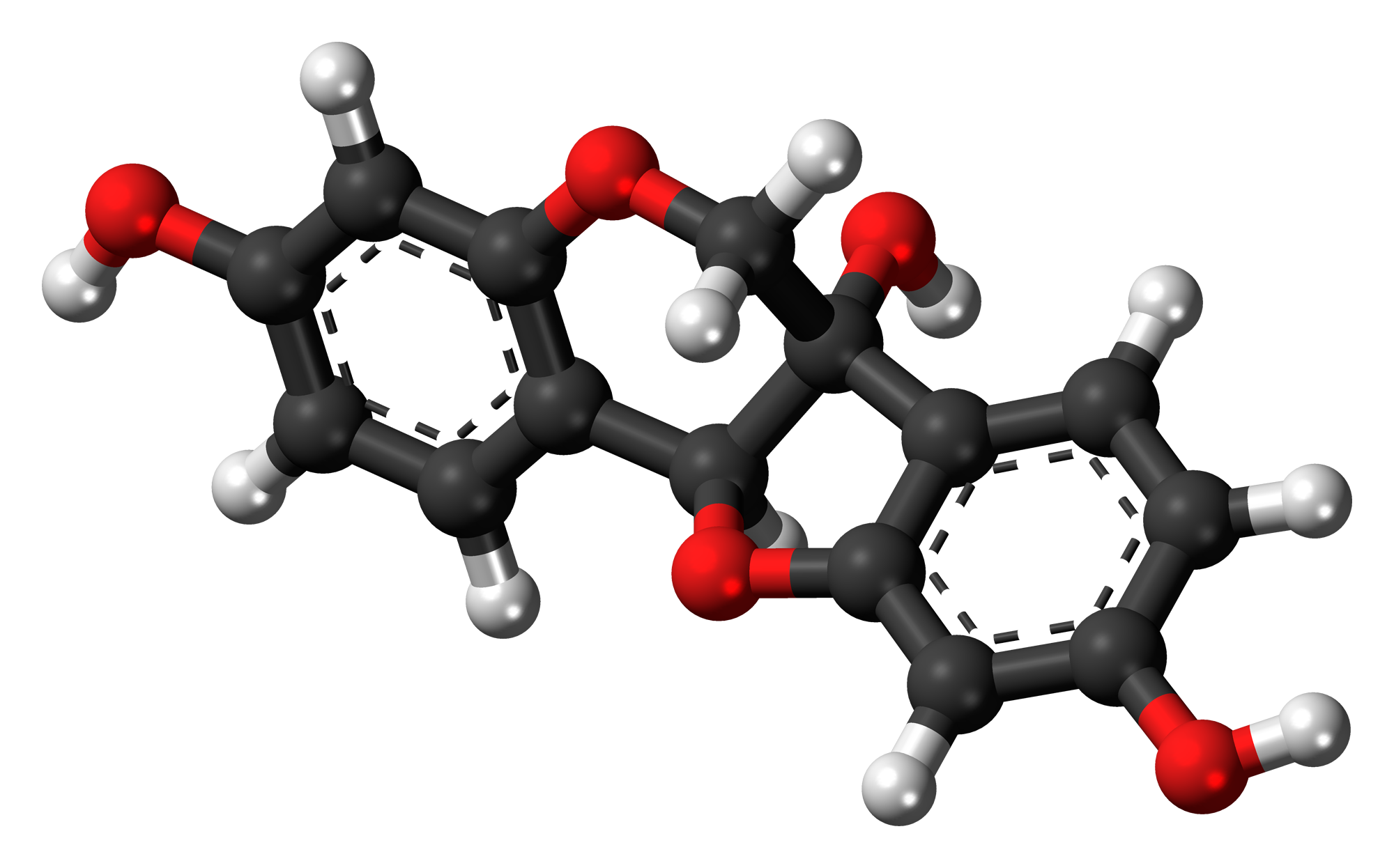

Names
- Preferred IUPAC name (6aS,11aS)-6H-[1]Benzofuro[3,2-c][1]benzopyran-3,6a,9(11aH)-triol

Identifiers
| CAS Number | 69393-95-9 |
| 3D model (JSmol) | Interactive image |
| ChEBI | CHEBI:15649 |
| ChemSpider | 114790 |
| KEGG | C01263 |
| PubChem CID | 129648 |
| UNII | Q0O9HGR94O |
| CompTox Dashboard (EPA) | DTXSID20989207 |
- InChI: InChI=1S/C15H12O5/c16-8-1-3-10-12(5-8)19-7-15(18)11-4-2-9(17)6-13(11)20-14(10)15/h1-6,14,16-18H,7H2/t14-,15+/m0/s1 Key: QMXOFBXZEKTJIK-LSDHHAIUSA-N
- SMILES: O3c1c(ccc(O)c1)[C@@H]4Oc2cc(O)ccc2[C@]4(O)C3

Properties
| Chemical formula | C_{15}H_{12}O_{5} |
| Molar mass | 272.25 g/mol |
- Except where otherwise noted, data are given for materials in their standard state (at 25 °C [77 °F], 100 kPa). Infobox references

Glycinol is a pterocarpan, a type of natural phenol. It is a phytoalexin found in the soybean (Glycine max) and is biosynthesised from daidzein.

Glycinol has potent phytoestrogenic activity. The so-called osteogenesis that this causes is postulated to be a preventative factor for osteoporosis.

Glycinol can be synthethised chemically and possesses two chiral centers. It is a precursor to glyceollins through the action of prenyltransferase enzymes such as trihydroxypterocarpan dimethylallyltransferase.

== Biosynthesis ==
In plants such as soybean, glycinol is derived from the daidzein in a sequence of steps. The final hydroxylation reaction is carried out by the enzyme 3,9-dihydroxypterocarpan 6a-monooxygenase, which is a cytochrome P450 protein that uses molecular oxygen to introduce the hydroxy group.

daidzein
Multi-step
3,9-dihydroxypterocarpan
Oxgenase
glycinol
