= Trihydroxypterocarpan dimethylallyltransferase =

Identifiers
- EC no.: 2.5.1.36
- CAS no.: 70851-94-4

Databases
- IntEnz: IntEnz view
- BRENDA: BRENDA entry
- ExPASy: NiceZyme view
- KEGG: KEGG entry
- MetaCyc: metabolic pathway
- PRIAM: profile
- PDB structures: RCSB PDB PDBe PDBsum
Search
- PMC: articles
- PubMed: articles
- NCBI: proteins

Trihydroxypterocarpan dimethylallyltransferase (EC 2.5.1.36, dimethylallylpyrophosphate:3,6a,9-trihydroxypterocarpan dimethylallyltransferase, dimethylallylpyrophosphate:trihydroxypterocarpan dimethylallyl transferase, dimethylallyl-diphosphate:(6aS,11aS)-3,6a,9-trihydroxypterocarpan dimethyltransferase) is an enzyme with systematic name dimethylallyl-diphosphate:(6aS,11aS)-3,6a,9-trihydroxypterocarpan dimethylallyltransferase. It catalyses two related chemical reactions in which an prenyl unit is added to a phenyl ring. The enzyme uses dimethylallyl pyrophosphate to provide the five-carbon fragment, with pyrophosphate (PP_{i}) as a byproduct:

glycinol
+
dimethylallyl pyrophosphate
PP_{i}
glyceocarpin

The enzyme can also catalyse the addition of the prenyl group at the alternative position next to the oxygen of the dihydropyran ring, giving 4-dimethylallylglycinol.

glycinol
+
dimethylallyl pyrophosphate
PP_{i}
4-dimethylallylglycinol

These compounds are intermediates in glyceollin biosynthesis in soybean. The final step is catalysed by the enzyme glyceollin synthase.
