= Phytoalexin =

Class of chemical compounds

Capsidiol is a phytoalexin produced by certain plants in response to pathogenic attack.

Phytoalexins are antimicrobial substances, some of which are antioxidative as well. They are defined not by their having any particular chemical structure or character, but by the fact that they are defensively synthesized de novo by plants that produce the compounds rapidly at sites of pathogen infection. In general phytoalexins are broad spectrum inhibitors; they are chemically diverse, and different chemical classes of compounds are characteristic of particular plant taxa. Phytoalexins tend to fall into several chemical classes, including terpenoids, glycosteroids, and alkaloids; however, the term applies to any phytochemicals that are induced by microbial infection.

== Function ==
Phytoalexins are produced in plants to act as toxins to the attacking organism. They may puncture the cell wall, delay maturation, disrupt metabolism or prevent reproduction of the pathogen in question. Their importance in plant defense is indicated by an increase in susceptibility of plant tissue to infection when phytoalexin biosynthesis is inhibited. Mutants incapable of phytoalexin production exhibit more extensive pathogen colonization as compared to wild types. As such, host-specific pathogens capable of degrading phytoalexins are more virulent than those unable to do so.

When a plant cell recognizes particles from damaged cells or particles from the pathogen, the plant launches a two-pronged resistance: a general short-term response and a delayed long-term specific response.

As part of the induced resistance, the short-term response, the plant deploys reactive oxygen species such as superoxide and hydrogen peroxide to kill invading cells. In pathogen interactions, the common short-term response is the hypersensitive response, in which cells surrounding the site of infection are signaled to undergo apoptosis, or programmed cell death, in order to prevent the spread of the pathogen to the rest of the plant.

Long-term resistance, or systemic acquired resistance (SAR), involves communication of the damaged tissue with the rest of the plant using plant hormones such as jasmonic acid, ethylene, abscisic acid, or salicylic acid. The reception of the signal leads to global changes within the plant, which induce expression of genes that protect from further pathogen intrusion, including enzymes involved in the production of phytoalexins. Often, if jasmonates or ethylene (both gaseous hormones) are released from the wounded tissue, neighboring plants also manufacture phytoalexins in response. For herbivores, common vectors for plant diseases, these and other wound response aromatics seem to act as a warning that the plant is no longer edible. Also, in accordance with the old adage, "an enemy of my enemy is my friend", the aromatics may alert natural enemies of the plant invaders to the presence thereof.

== Recent research ==
Allixin (3-hydroxy-5-methoxy-6-methyl-2-pentyl-4H-pyran-4-one), a non-sulfur-containing compound having a γ-pyrone skeletal structure, was the first compound isolated from garlic as a phytoalexin, a product induced in plants by continuous stress. This compound has been shown to have unique biological properties, such as anti-oxidative effects, anti-microbial effects, anti-tumor promoting effects, inhibition of aflatoxin B2 DNA binding, and neurotrophic effects. Allixin showed an anti-tumor promoting effect in vivo, inhibiting skin tumor formation by TPA in DMBA initiated mice. Herein, allixin and/or its analogs may be expected to be useful compounds for cancer prevention or chemotherapy agents for other diseases.

== Role of natural phenols in the plant defense against fungal pathogens ==
Polyphenols, especially isoflavonoids and related substances, play a role in the plant defense against fungal and other microbial pathogens.

In Vitis vinifera grape, trans-resveratrol is a phytoalexin produced against the growth of fungal pathogens such as Botrytis cinerea and delta-viniferin is another grapevine phytoalexin produced following fungal infection by Plasmopara viticola. Pinosylvin is a pre-infectious stilbenoid toxin (i.e. synthesized prior to infection), contrary to phytoalexins which are synthesized during infection. It is present in the heartwood of Pinaceae. It is a fungitoxin protecting the wood from fungal infection.

Sakuranetin is a flavanone, a type of flavonoid. It can be found in Polymnia fruticosa and rice, where it acts as a phytoalexin against spore germination of Pyricularia oryzae. In Sorghum, the SbF3'H2 gene, encoding a flavonoid 3'-hydroxylase, seems to be expressed in pathogen-specific 3-deoxyanthocyanidin phytoalexin synthesis, for example in Sorghum-Colletotrichum interactions.

6-Methoxymellein is a dihydroisocoumarin and a phytoalexin induced in carrot slices by UV-C, that allows resistance to Botrytis cinerea and other microorganisms.

Danielone is a phytoalexin found in the papaya fruit. This compound showed high antifungal activity against Colletotrichum gloesporioides, a pathogenic fungus of papaya.

Stilbenes are produced in Eucalyptus sideroxylon in case of pathogen attacks. Such compounds can be implied in the hypersensitive response of plants. High levels of polyphenols in some woods can explain their natural preservation against rot.

Avenanthramides are phytoalexins produced by Avena sativa in its response to Puccinia coronata var. avenae f. sp. avenae, the oat crown rust. (Avenanthramides were formerly called avenalumins.)

== See also ==
- Alexin (humoral immunity)
- Allicin
- Garlic
- Plant defense against herbivory
- Pterostilbene
- Salvestrol
