= Ora (given name) =

Ora is the given name of:

- Ora Alexander (fl. early 1930s), American classic female blues singer
- Ora Anlen (1944–2022), Israeli Paralympic athlete in various sports
- Ora Carew (1893–1955), American silent film actress
- Ora Collard (1902–1961), American businessman and politician
- Ora Graves (1896–1961), US Navy sailor and Medal of Honor recipient
- Ora Haibe (1887–1970), American race car driver
- Ora Kedem (1924–2026), Austrian-born Israeli chemist and academic
- Ora Larthard (1889–1974), American cellist
- Ora Lassila, Finnish computer scientist
- Ora McMurry, United States Army Air Service pilot during World War I
- Ora Namir (1930–2019), Israeli former politician and diplomat
- Ora Nichols, American pioneer of radio sound effects
- Ora A. Oldfield (1893–1963), American politician and businessman
- Ora F. Porter (1879–1970), American nurse, influential figure in Bowling Green’s African-American community
- Ora Eddleman Reed (1880–1968), American writer, editor, radio host
- Ora R. Rice (1885–1966), American politician
- Ora Hanson Snyder (1876–1948), American businesswoman
- Ora Washington (1898–1971), African-American tennis player
- Ora, mother of Serug in the Bible
