= Ora =

ORA or Ora may refer to:

== Arts and entertainment ==
- Ora (film), a 2011 experimental dance film
- Ora (Jovanotti album), 2011, or the title track
- Ora (Rita Ora album), 2012
- Ora TV, an on-demand television company
- Rita Ora (born 1990), British singer-songwriter and actress
- "Ora", a 2014 song by James Booker
- "Ora", a catchphrase said by Jotaro Kujo

== Languages ==
- Ivbiosakon language, spoken in Edo, Nigeria
- Oroha language, spoken in the Solomon Islands (ISO 639-3:ora)

== Organizations ==
- Authentic Renewal Organization (Organización Renovadora Autentica), a Venezuelan political party
- Ocean Recovery Alliance, an organization for improving oceanic health
- Office of Global Regulatory Operations and Policy also known as the Office of Regulatory Affairs, a sub-agency of the US Food and Drug Administration
- Office of Religious Affairs of the US Department of Defense
- Organisation de résistance de l'armée, a paramilitary group in France during World War II
- Organization for the Resolution of Agunot, a nonprofit to reform Jewish divorce
- Reformist Party ORA, a political party in Kosovo
- Revolutionary Anarchist Organization, a French anarchist organization

== People ==
- Ora (given name), a list of people
- Ora (mythology), in Albanian folklore
- Rita Ora (born 1990), British-Albanian singer-songwriter and actress

== Places ==
=== Japan ===
- Ōra, Gunma, a town
- Ōra District, Gunma, a rural district

=== United States ===
- Ora Township, Jackson County, Illinois
- Ora, Indiana
- Ora, Mississippi
- Ora, Texas, a ghost town

=== Elsewhere ===
- Ora, Cyprus, a village
- Ora, Israel, a settlement southwest of Jerusalem
- Ora River, Uganda
- Ora Arena, a venue in Turkey
- Auer, South Tyrol, Italy (Italian: Ora)
- Odigram, Pakistan (ancient name: Ora)

== Science and technology ==
- Ora (beetle), a genus of marsh beetle
- .ora, the OpenRaster file extension
- Organic residue analysis, in archaeology
- Ora serrata, of the eye

== Transport ==
- Ora (marque), a Chinese car brand
- USS Ora, a U.S. Navy motorboat (1917–1920)
- One Rail Australia, an Australian train operator

== Other uses ==
- Ora (currency), used in Orania, South Africa
- Typhoon Ora (disambiguation), seven storms in the Pacific
- Garganega, an Italian wine grape
- Komodo dragon

== See also ==
- Oras (disambiguation)
- Hora (disambiguation)
- Orra (disambiguation)
