= Cedar oil =

Essential oil

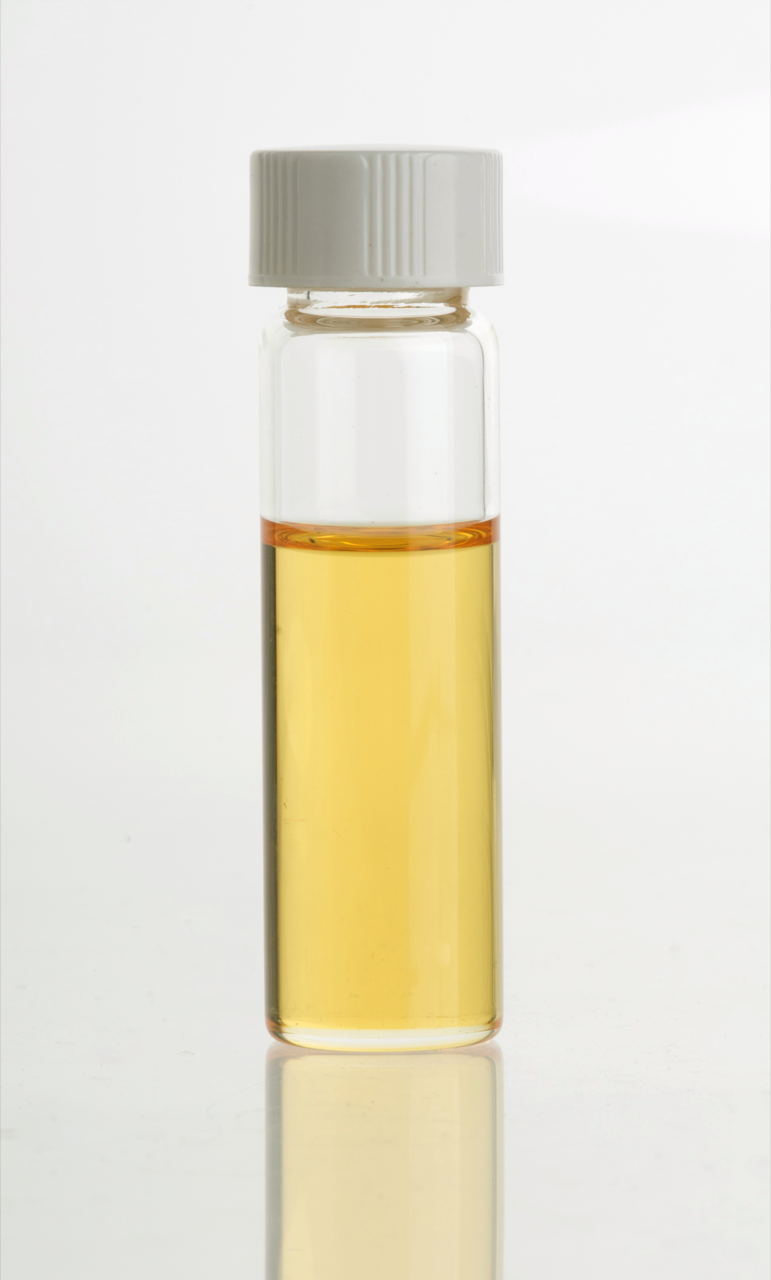
Cedarwood essential oil

Cedar oil, also known as cedarwood oil, is an essential oil derived from various types of conifers, most in the pine or cypress botanical families. It is produced from the foliage, and sometimes the wood, roots, and stumps left after logging of trees for timber. It has many uses in art, industry, and perfumery, and while the characteristics of oils derived from various species may vary, all have some degree of pesticidal effects.

== Sources and characteristics ==
Although termed cedar or cedarwood oils, the most important oils are produced from distilling wood of a number of different junipers (Juniperus) and cypresses (Cupressus; both of the family Cupressaceae), rather than true cedars (of the family Pinaceae). Similar oils are distilled, pressed or chemically extracted in small quantities from wood, roots, and leaves from plants of the genera Platycladus, Cupressus, Taiwania, and Calocedrus.

One of the elements found in many cedar trees is cedrol. The amount of cedrol in a species of cedar affects its pesticidal effect on insects. As part of ancient Egyptian funerary practices, cedar oil was used in embalming, which in effect helped to keep insects from disturbing the body.

Cedarwood oil is a mixture of organic compounds considered generally safe by the FDA as a food additive preservative. The United States EPA "does not expect [toxic] effects to occur among users of currently registered cedarwood oil products" because their use and public exposure is at a lower level and more intermittent than in case studies (e.g., U.S. National Toxicology Program). The EPA believes there is negligible human and environmental risk posed by exposure to registered cedarwood pesticide if used in properly prescribed manner.

All the cedarwood oils of commerce contain a group of chemically related compounds, the relative proportions of which depend upon the species from which the oil is obtained. These compounds include cedrol and cedrene, and while they contribute something to the odor of the whole oil they are also valuable to the chemical industry for conversion to other derivatives with fragrance applications. The oils are therefore used both directly and as sources of chemical isolates.

Composition of some commercial and true (Cedrus) cedarwood oils (%)
Substance	Texas	Virginia (Juniperus virginiana)	Western red (Thuja plicata)	Deodar (C. deodara)	C. libani	C. atlantica
Thujopsene	60.4	27.6	0			
Cedrol	19.0	15.8	0			
(−)-α-Cedrene	1.8	27.2	0			
(+)-β-Cedrene	1.6	7.7	0			
α-Copaene	2.8	6.3	0			
Widdrol	1.1	1.0	0			
Methyl thujate	0	0	65			
Thujic acid	0	0	25			
β-Thujaplicin	0	0	1			
α-Thujaplicin	0	0	1			

== Uses ==
Cedarwood oils each have characteristic woody odours which may change somewhat in the course of drying out. The crude oils are often yellowish or even darker in color and some, such as Texas cedarwood oil (derived primarily from Juniperus ashei and J. deppeana), are quite viscous and deposit crystals on standing. They find use (sometimes after rectification) in a range of fragrance applications such as soap perfumes, household sprays, floor polishes and insecticides. Small quantities are used in microscope work as a clearing oil.

Today, cedarwood oil is often used for its aromatic properties, especially in aromatherapy; it can also be used to renew the smell of natural cedar furniture. Cedarwood oil is used as an insect repellent, both directly applied to the skin and as an additive to sprays, candles and other products.

In India, oil from the deodar cedar (Cedrus deodara, a true cedar) has been shown to possess insecticidal and antifungal properties and to have some potential for control of fungal deterioration of spices during storage. It is still sometimes also used to clarify emeralds.

== History ==
=== Cedar of Lebanon ===
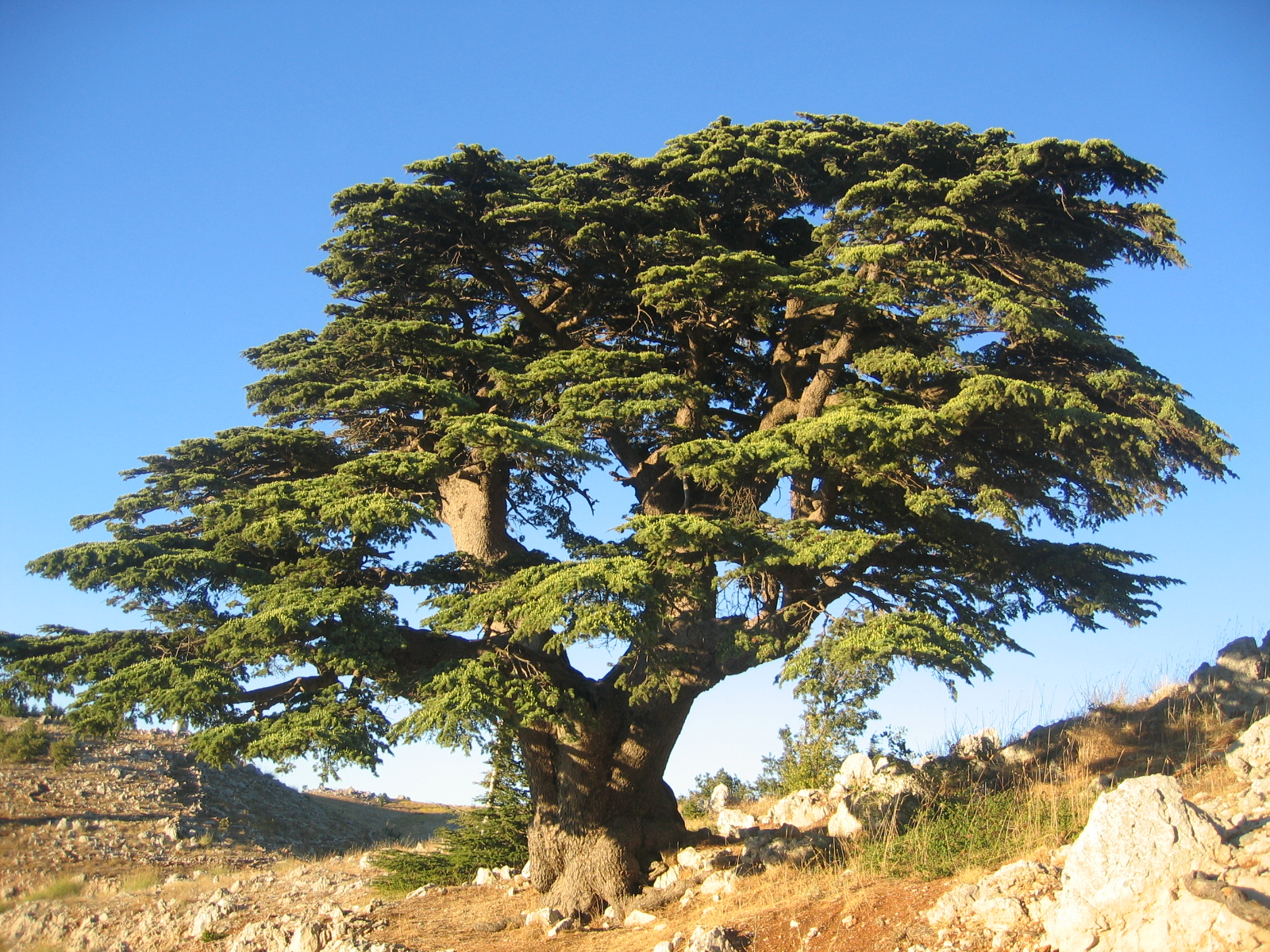
Cedrus libani

The cedarwood oil of the ancients, in particular the Sumerians and Egyptians, was derived from the Cedar of Lebanon (Cedrus libani), a true cedar native to the northern and western mountains of West Asia. The once-mighty Cedar of Lebanon forests of antiquity have been almost entirely eradicated, and today no commercial oil extraction is based on this species.

=== Sumer ===
Cedarwood oil was used as the base for paints by the ancient Sumerians. They would grind cobalt compounds in a mortar to produce a blue pigment. They could obtain green from copper, yellow from lead antimonate, black from charcoal, and white from gypsum.

=== Ancient Egypt ===
One of three methods of ancient Egyptian embalming practices employs the use of cedarwood oil. This was a less costly method than the best known of the ancient Egyptian practices of removing internal organs for separate preservation in canopic jars. The practice

...called for the injection of cedar oil into body cavities without evisceration. The body was laid in natrum or natron—a fixed alkali—for the prescribed period, after which the cedarwood oil, which had dissolved the soft organs, was released; and the body, its flesh dissolved by the natron, was reduced to preserved skin and bones.

=== Classical antiquity ===
As the Roman naturalist and author Pliny the Elder (23/24 –79 CE) in his encyclopedic work Natural History (Latin: Naturalis Historia) describes how aromatic oils are produced through the destructive distillation of pine wood, he also mentions that a similar substance, “cedrium” (cedar oil), is produced in Syria, and how it is used.

In Europe, tar is extracted from [Pinus mugo] by the agency of fire. ... The first steam that exudes flows ... into a reservoir made for its reception: in Syria this substance is known as “cedrium”; and it possesses such remarkable strength, that in Egypt the bodies of the dead, after being steeped in it, are preserved from all corruption.

Archaeological evidence from the Hellenistic period has confirmed that cedar oil could derive from the Lebanon cedar rather than juniper species. Organic residue analysis from Tel Kedesh, an archaeological site in northern Israel, provided direct chemical verification of "true" cedar oil and its long-attested association with Phoenicia as described in classical sources. The vessels, recovered from a Seleucid administrative archive active in the 2nd century BCE, support ancient texts that describe the use of cedar oil to preserve papyrus and protect documents from insects and decay. The same research also showed that cedar oil could be blended with aromatic resins such as storax to enhance its preservative and antimicrobial properties.

=== Light microscopy ===
Until the development of synthetic immersion oil in the 1940s, cedarwood oil was widely used for the oil immersion objective in light microscopy.
