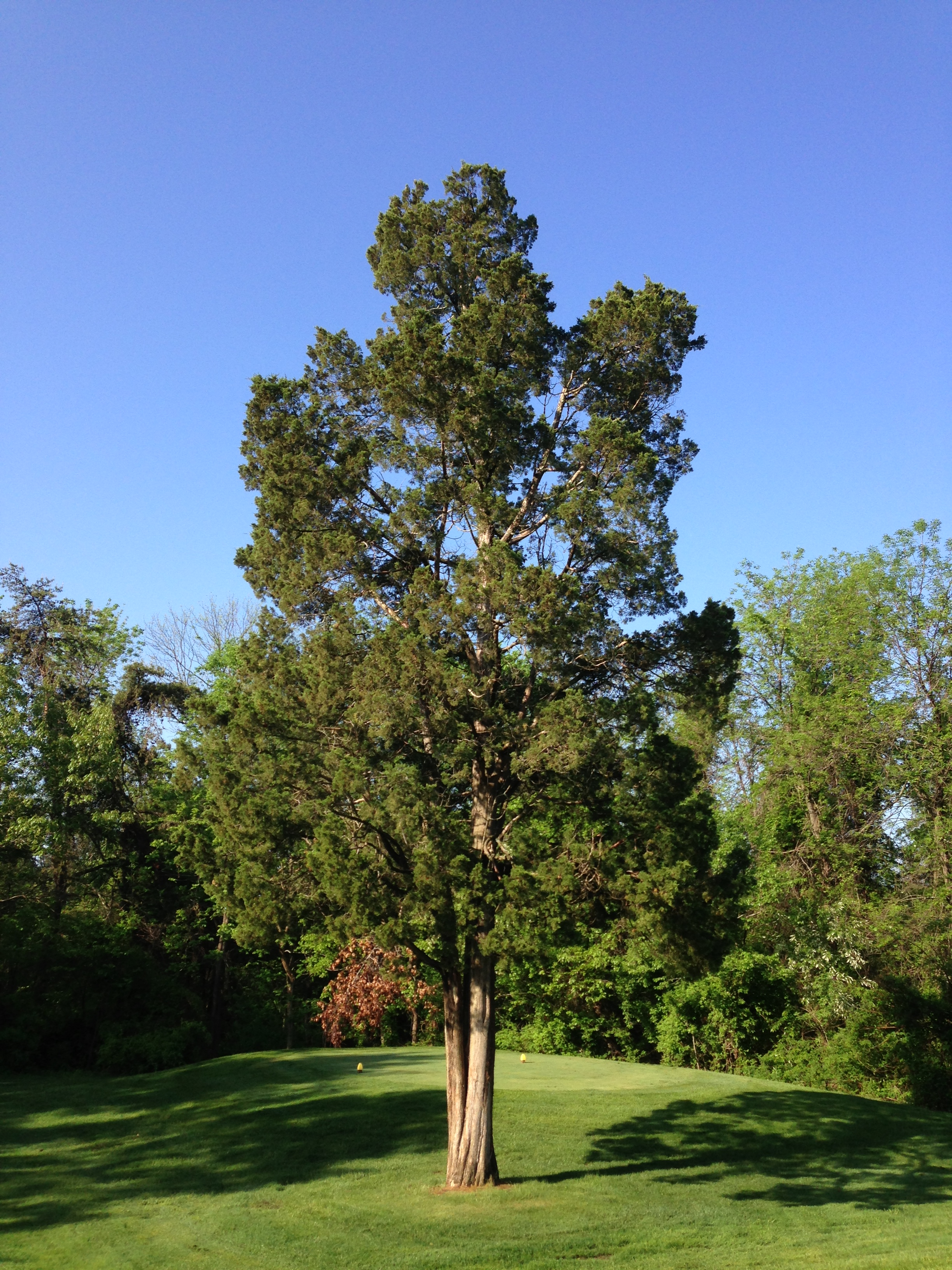
- Juniperus virginiana on a golf course in northern Virginia

Conservation status
- Least Concern (IUCN 3.1)

- Secure (NatureServe)

Scientific classification
- Kingdom: Plantae
- Clade: Tracheophytes
- Clade: Gymnosperms
- Division: Pinophyta
- Class: Pinopsida
- Order: Cupressales
- Family: Cupressaceae
- Genus: Juniperus
- Section: Juniperus sect. Sabina
- Species: J. virginiana

Binomial name
- Juniperus virginiana L.
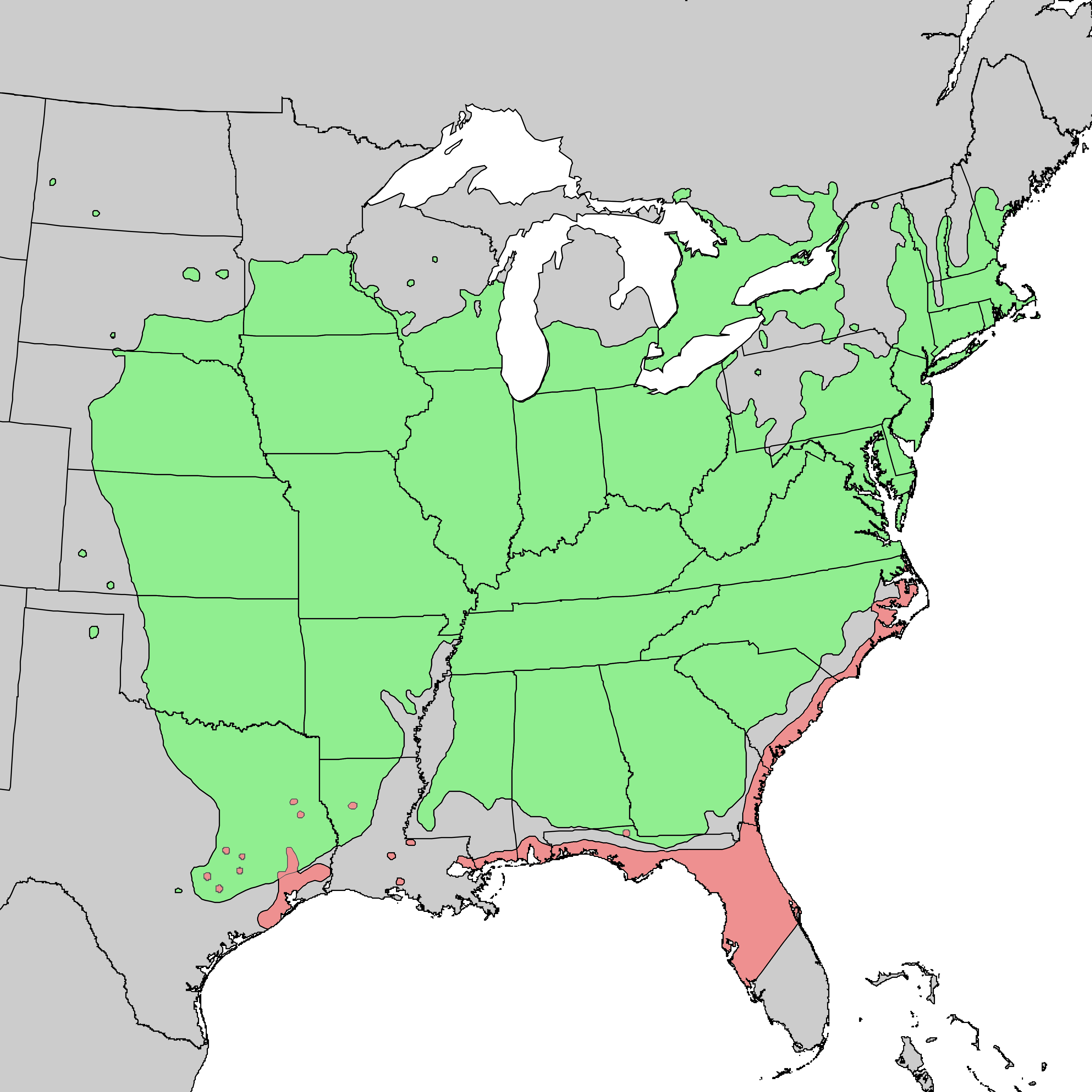
- Natural distribution of varieties: J. virginiana var. virginiana (green) and J. virginiana var. silicicola (red)

= Juniperus virginiana =

Species of conifer tree

Juniperus virginiana, also known as eastern red cedar, red cedar, Virginian juniper, eastern juniper, red juniper, and other local names, is a species of juniper native to eastern North America from southeastern Canada to the Gulf of Mexico and east of the Great Plains. Farther west it is replaced by the closely related Juniperus scopulorum (Rocky Mountain juniper) and to the southwest by Juniperus ashei (Ashe juniper). It is not to be confused with Thuja occidentalis (eastern white cedar).

== Description ==
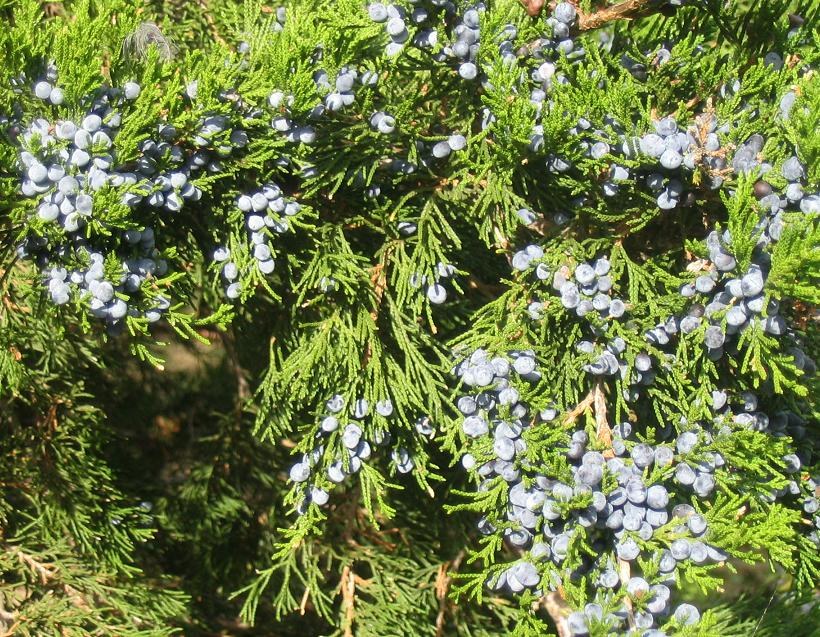
Juniperus virginiana foliage and mature cones

Juniperus virginiana is a dense moderately-growing coniferous evergreen tree with a conical or subcylindrical shaped crown that may never become more than a bush on poor soil, but is ordinarily from 5–20 metres (16–66 feet) tall, with a short trunk 30–100 centimetres (12–39 inches) in diameter, rarely to 3 m (9.8 ft) in height and 170 cm (67 in) in diameter. The oldest tree reported, from West Virginia, was 940 years old. The bark is reddish-brown, fibrous, and peels off in narrow strips. The leaves are of two types; sharp, spreading needle-like juvenile leaves 5–10 millimetres (3/16–3/8 in) long, and tightly adpressed scale-like adult leaves 2–4 mm (1/16–3/16 in) long; they are arranged in opposite decussate pairs or occasionally whorls of three. The juvenile leaves are found on young plants up to 3 years old, and as scattered shoots on adult trees, usually in shade. The seed cones are 3–7 mm (1/8–1/4 in) long, berry-like, dark purple-blue with a white wax cover giving an overall sky-blue color (though the wax often rubs off); they contain one to three (rarely up to four) seeds, and are mature in 6–8 months from pollination. The juniper berry is an important winter food for many birds, which disperse the wingless seeds. The pollen cones are 2–3 mm (1/16–1/8 in) long and 1.5 mm (1/16 in) broad, shedding pollen in late winter or early spring. The trees are usually dioecious, with pollen and seed cones on separate trees, yet some are monoecious.

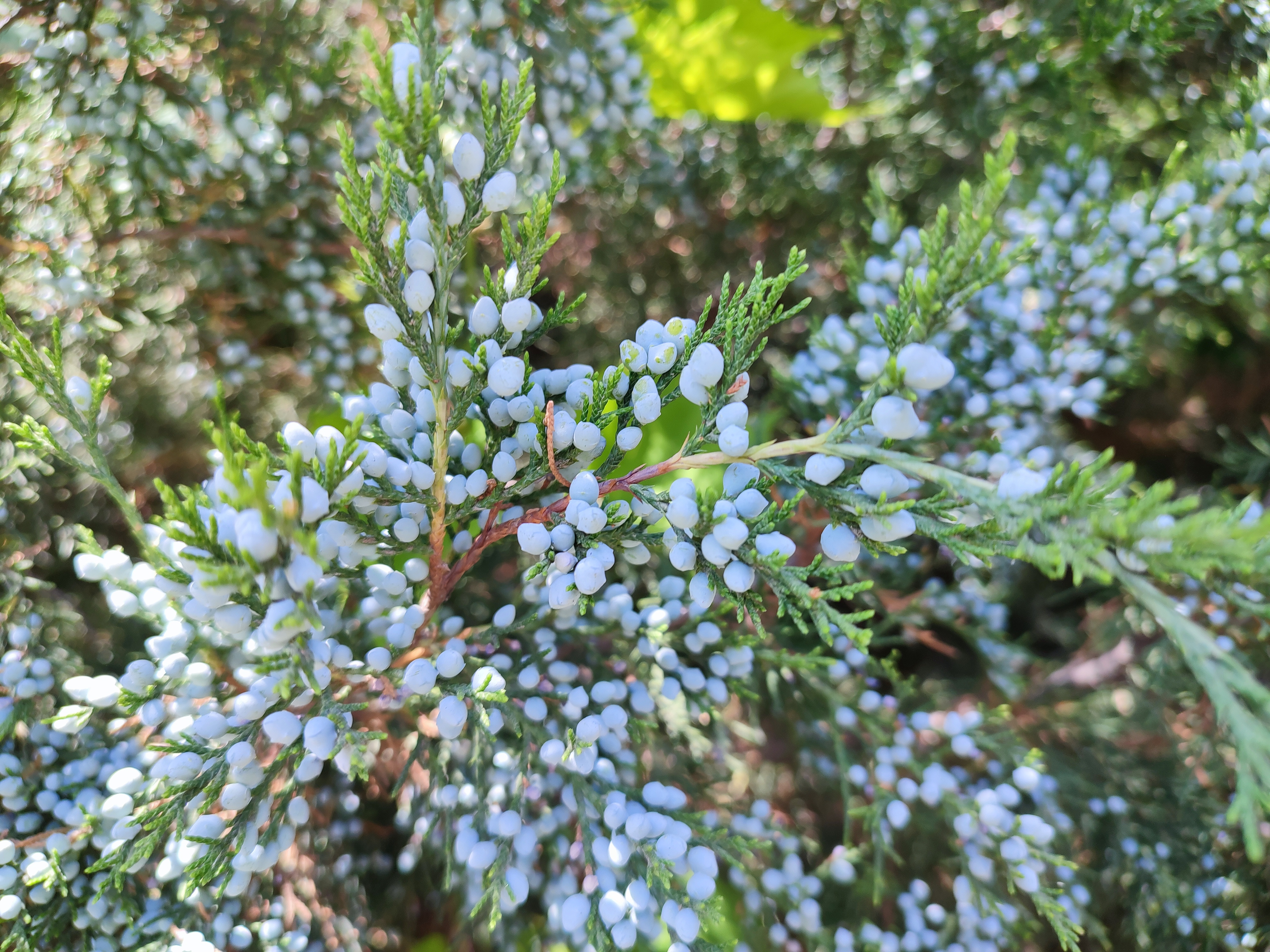
Eastern red cedar (Juniperus virginiana)

There are two varieties, which intergrade where they meet:

- Juniperus virginiana var. virginiana is called eastern red cedar / juniper. It is found in eastern North America, from Maine, west to southern Ontario and South Dakota, south to northernmost Florida and southwest into the post oak savannah of east-central Texas. Cones are larger, 4–7 mm (3/16–1/4 in); scale leaves are acute at apex and bark is red-brown.
- Juniperus virginiana var. silicicola (Small) E.Murray (syn. Sabina silicicola Small, Juniperus silicicola [Small] L.H.Bailey) is known as southern or sand red cedar / juniper. Its variety name means "flint-dweller", from Latin silex and -cola. Habitat is along the Atlantic and Gulf coasts from the extreme southeastern corner of Virginia, south to central Florida and west to southeast Texas. Cones are smaller, 3–4 mm (1/8–3/16 in); scale leaves are blunt at apex and the bark is orange-brown. It is treated by some authors at the lower rank of variety, while others treat it as a distinct species.

== Ecology ==
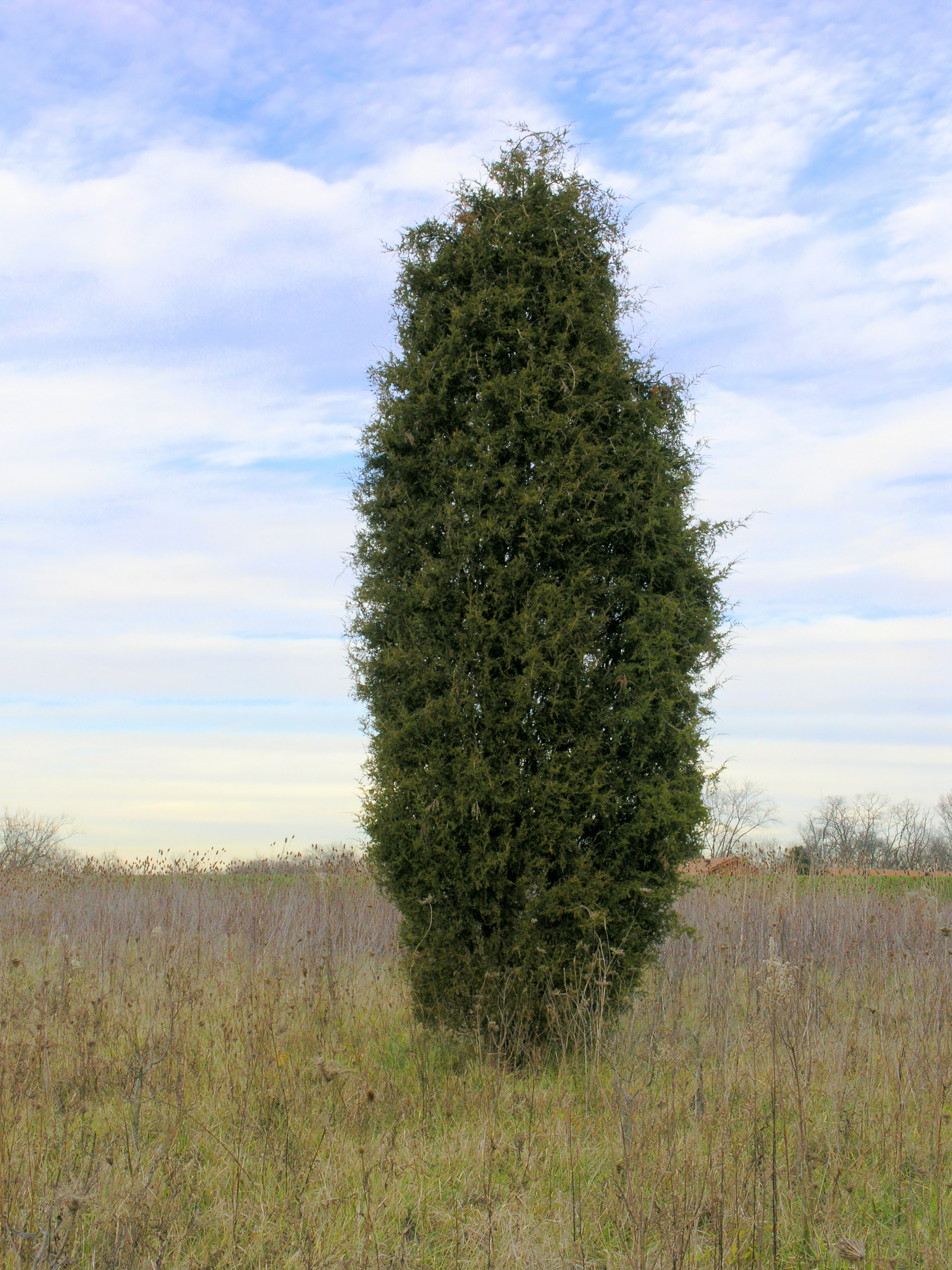
Characteristic shape in old field succession

Eastern red cedar is a pioneer species, meaning that it is one of the first trees to repopulate disturbed sites. It is unusually long lived among pioneer species, with the potential to live over 900 years. It is commonly found in prairies or oak barrens, old pastures, or limestone hills, often along highways and near recent construction sites. It is an alternate host for cedar–apple rust, an economically significant fungal disease of apples, and some management strategies recommend the removal of J. virginiana near apple orchards

Eastern red cedar grows in a wide range of climatic and soil conditions. The tree is extremely tolerant of drought due to its extensive, fibrous root system and reduced leaf area. It can be found from droughty, rocky soils with few nutrients to rich alluvial soils with abundant moisture. However, eastern red cedar is almost never dominant on such rich mesic sites due to intense competition with faster growing, more shade tolerant hardwood trees.

Outside of its native range it is considered an invasive species, and it can be aggressive even within its range. It is fire-intolerant, and was previously controlled by periodic wildfires. Low branches near the ground burn and provide a ladder that allows fire to engulf the whole tree. Grasses recover quickly from low severity fires that are characteristic of prairies that kept the trees at bay. With the urbanization of prairies, the fires have been stopped with roads, plowed fields, and other fire breaks, allowing J. virginiana and other trees to invade. Trees are destructive to grasslands if left unchecked, and are actively being eliminated by cutting and prescribed burning. The trees also burn very readily, and dense populations were blamed for the rapid spread of wildfires in drought-stricken Oklahoma and Texas in 2005 and 2006. On the Great Plains, expanding red cedar populations are altering the plains ecosystem: a majority of the region's bird species are not present in areas where the tree's land cover exceeds 10 percent, and most small mammal species are not present where land cover exceeds 30 percent.

Eastern red cedar benefits from increased CO_{2} levels, unlike the grasses with which it competes. Many grasses are C4 plants that concentrate CO_{2} levels in their bundle sheaths to increase the efficiency of RuBisCO, the enzyme responsible for photosynthesis, while junipers are C3 plants that rely on (and may benefit from) the natural CO_{2} concentrations of the environment, although they are less efficient at fixing CO_{2} in general.

Alterations of prairie ecosystems by J. virginiana include outcompeting forage species in pastureland. The low branches and wide base occupy a significant portion of land area. The thick foliage blocks out most light, so few plants can live under the canopy. The needles that fall raise the pH of the soil, making it alkaline, which holds nutrients such as phosphorus, making it harder for plants to absorb them. However, studies have found that Juniperus virginiana forests that replace grasslands have a statistically insignificant decrease to a significant increase in levels of soil nitrogen. J. virginiana forests have higher overall nitrogen use efficiency (NUE), despite the common grassland species Andropogon gerardi having a far higher NUE during photosynthesis (PNUE). The forests store much greater amounts of carbon in both biomass and soil, with most of the additional carbon stored aboveground. There is no significant difference in soil microbial activity.

Cedar waxwings are fond of red cedar berries. It takes about 12 minutes for their seeds to pass through the birds' guts, and seeds that have been consumed by this bird have levels of germination roughly three times higher than those of seeds the birds did not eat. Many other birds such as turkeys and bluebirds, along with many mammals such as rabbits, foxes, raccoons, and coyotes also consume them.

Virginia juniper's compact, evergreen foliage makes it favorable for bird nests and as a winter shelter location for birds and mammals.

== Pollen ==
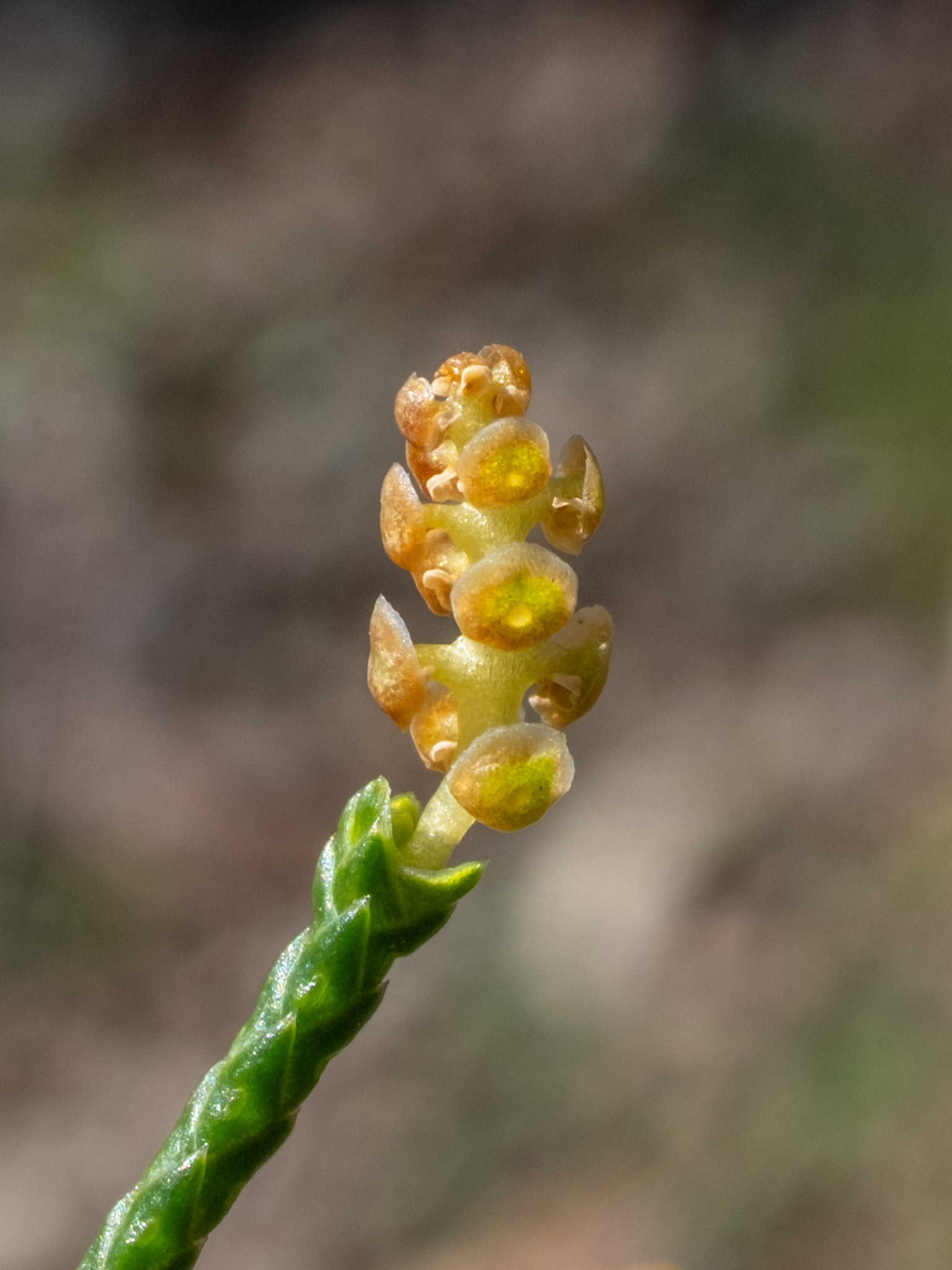
Male cone where pollen is produced

The pollen of Juniperus virginiana var. virginiana is a known allergen. The nominate variety is native to Eastern North America, north of Mexico, with the pollen releasing at various points in the spring, variable by latitude and elevation.

== Uses ==
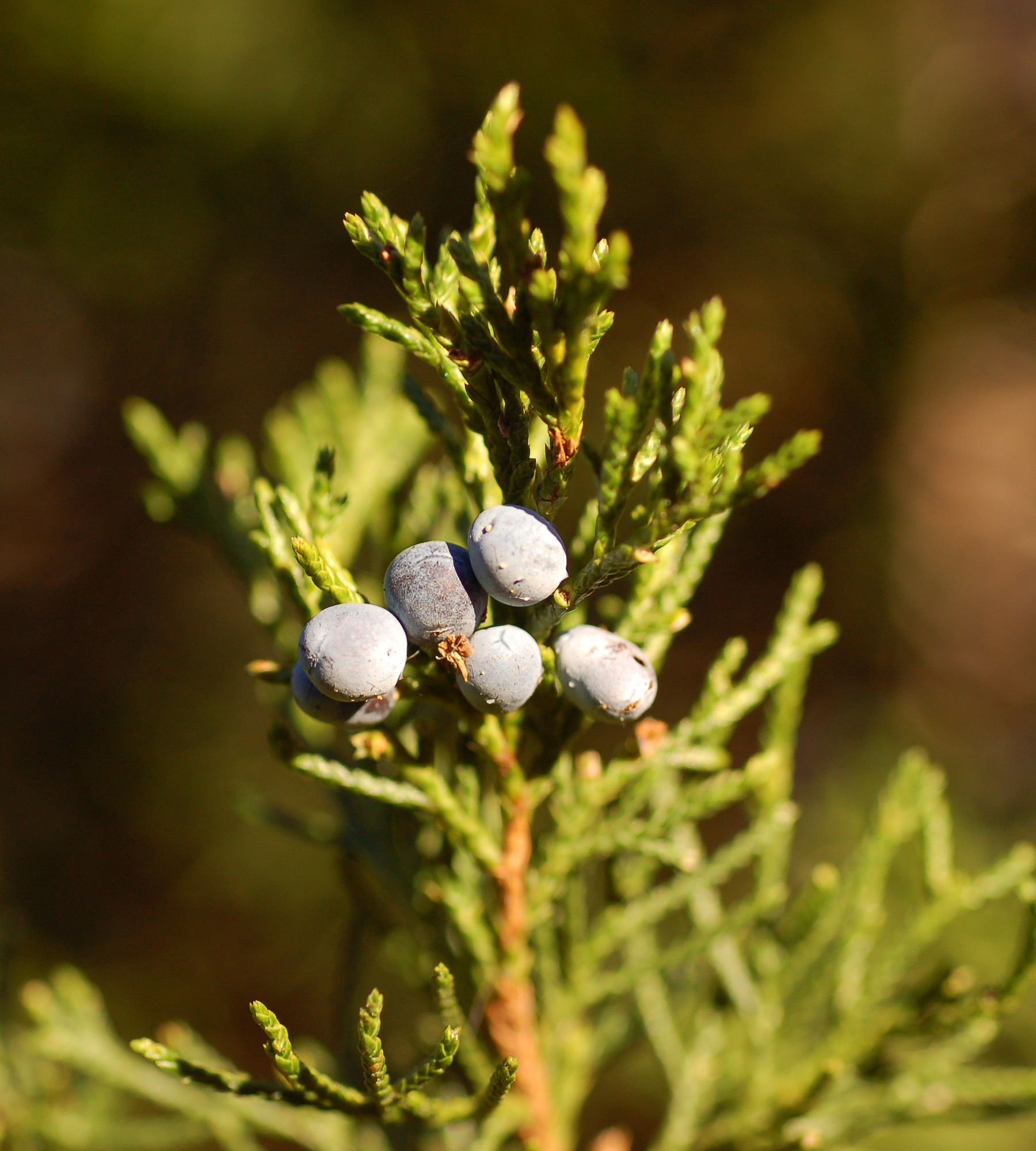
"Berries" of the 'Corcorcor' cultivar

The fragrant, finely grained, soft, brittle, very light, pinkish to brownish red heartwood is very durable, even in contact with soil. Because of its resistance to decay, the wood is often used for fence posts. Moths avoid the aromatic wood, and therefore it is in demand as lining for clothes chests and closets, which are often denominated "cedar closets" and "cedar chests". If correctly prepared, excellent English longbows, flatbows, and Native American sinew-backed bows can be made from it. It is marketed as "eastern red cedar" and "aromatic cedar". The best portions of the heartwood are one of the few woods that are suitable for making pencils; however, the supply had so diminished by the 1940s that the wood of the incense-cedar largely replaced it.

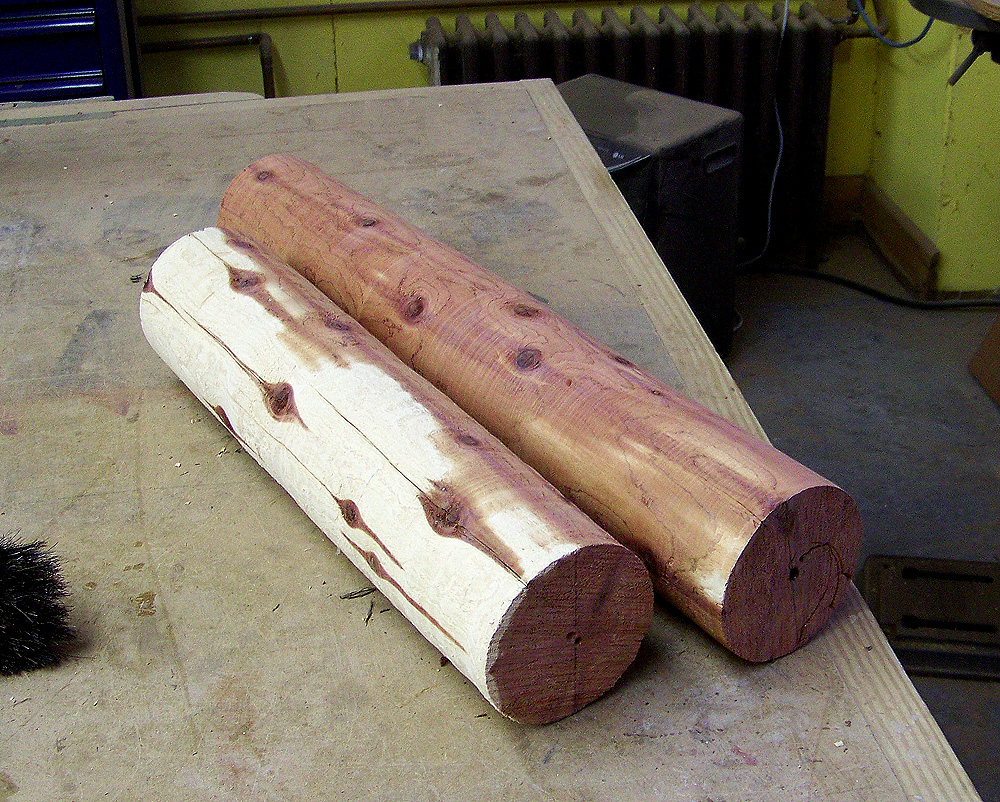
A log sawn in two and turned on a lathe, exposing the pale sapwood and the reddish heartwood

Part of the commercially available cedar oil is produced by steam distillation from wood shavings. It contains a wide variety of terpenes. The three major components, alpha-cedrene, thujopsene and cedrol, constitute more than 60% of the essential oil. The fruits also yield an essential oil which contains mostly D-Limonene.

The oil derived from foliage and twigs has two main constituents: safrole and limonene. One minor compound is the podophyllotoxin, a non-alkaloid toxin lignan.

Native American tribes have historically used poles of eastern red cedar wood to demarcate agreed tribal hunting territories. French traders named Baton Rouge, Louisiana, which denotes "red stick", from the reddish color of these poles. Some nations continue to use it ceremonially.

The Cahokia Woodhenge series of timber circles that the pre-Columbian Mississippian culture in western Illinois erected were constructed of massive logs of eastern juniper. One iteration of such a circle, Woodhenge III, which is thought to have been constructed circa AD 1000, had 48 posts in the circle of 410 feet (120 m) in diameter and a 49th pole in the center.

Among many Native American cultures, the smoke of burning eastern red cedar is believed to expel evil spirits prior to conducting a ceremony, such as a healing ceremony.

During the Dust Bowl drought of the 1930s, the Prairie States Forest Project encouraged farmers to plant shelterbelts, i.e. wind breaks, of eastern red cedar throughout the Great Plains of the US. The trees thrive in adverse conditions. Tolerant of both drought and cold, they grow well in rocky, sandy, and clayey soils. Competition between individual trees is minimal, and therefore they can be closely planted in rows, in which situation they still grow to full height, creating a solid windbreak in a short time.

A number of cultivars have been selected for horticulture, including 'Canaertii' (narrow conical; female) 'Corcorcor' (with a dense, erect crown; female), 'Goldspire' (narrow conical with yellow foliage), and 'Kobold' (dwarf). Some cultivars previously listed under this species, notably 'Skyrocket', are actually cultivars of J. scopulorum.

In the Arkansas, Missouri, and Oklahoma Ozarks, eastern red cedar is commonly used as a Christmas tree.

This is the most widely used wood for making blocks for recorders. There are numerous properties that it possesses that make it uniquely suitable for this, such as good moisture absorption, low expansion when wet (so it does not crack the recorder head), and mild antiseptic properties.

Eastern red cedar is considered effective as a shelter-belt tree and for erosion control. Being coniferous, red cedar has dense evergreen foliage which makes it an ideal windbreak. The tree's extensive root system allows it to survive drought, and helps to retain surrounding topsoil during dry, windy conditions.

== See also ==
- Cedar wood
- Eastern white cedar
