= Oras =

Oras may refer to:

== Places ==
- Oras, Eastern Samar, a municipality in the Philippines
- Oraș, the term for "town" in Romania and Moldova

== People ==
=== Surname ===
- Allan Oras (born 1975), Estonian cyclist
- Ants Oras (1900–1982), Estonian translator and writer
- Ester Oras (born 1984), Estonian archaeochemist

=== Given name ===
- Lee Oras Overholts (1890 – 1946), American mycologist
- Oras Sattar (b. 1981), Iraqi singer, composer and songwriter
- Oras Tynkkynen (born 1977), Member of the Parliament of Finland

== Other uses ==
- Oras (company), a Finnish faucet manufacturer
- Pokémon Omega Ruby and Alpha Sapphire, the 2014 Nintendo 3DS remakes of Pokémon Ruby and Sapphire
- 24 Oras, national network news program of GMA Network in the Philippines

== See also ==
- Ora (disambiguation)
