= Orra =

Orra or ORRA may refer to:

People:

- Orra White Hitchcock (1796–1863), American scientific illustrator
- Orra E. Monnette (1873–1936), American attorney, author and banker

Other:

- Oria, Apulia, village in southern Italy
- Oriental Rug Retailers of America
- Obamacare Repeal Reconciliation Act of 2017, a proposed name for the American Health Care Act of 2017

== See also ==
- Ora (disambiguation)
