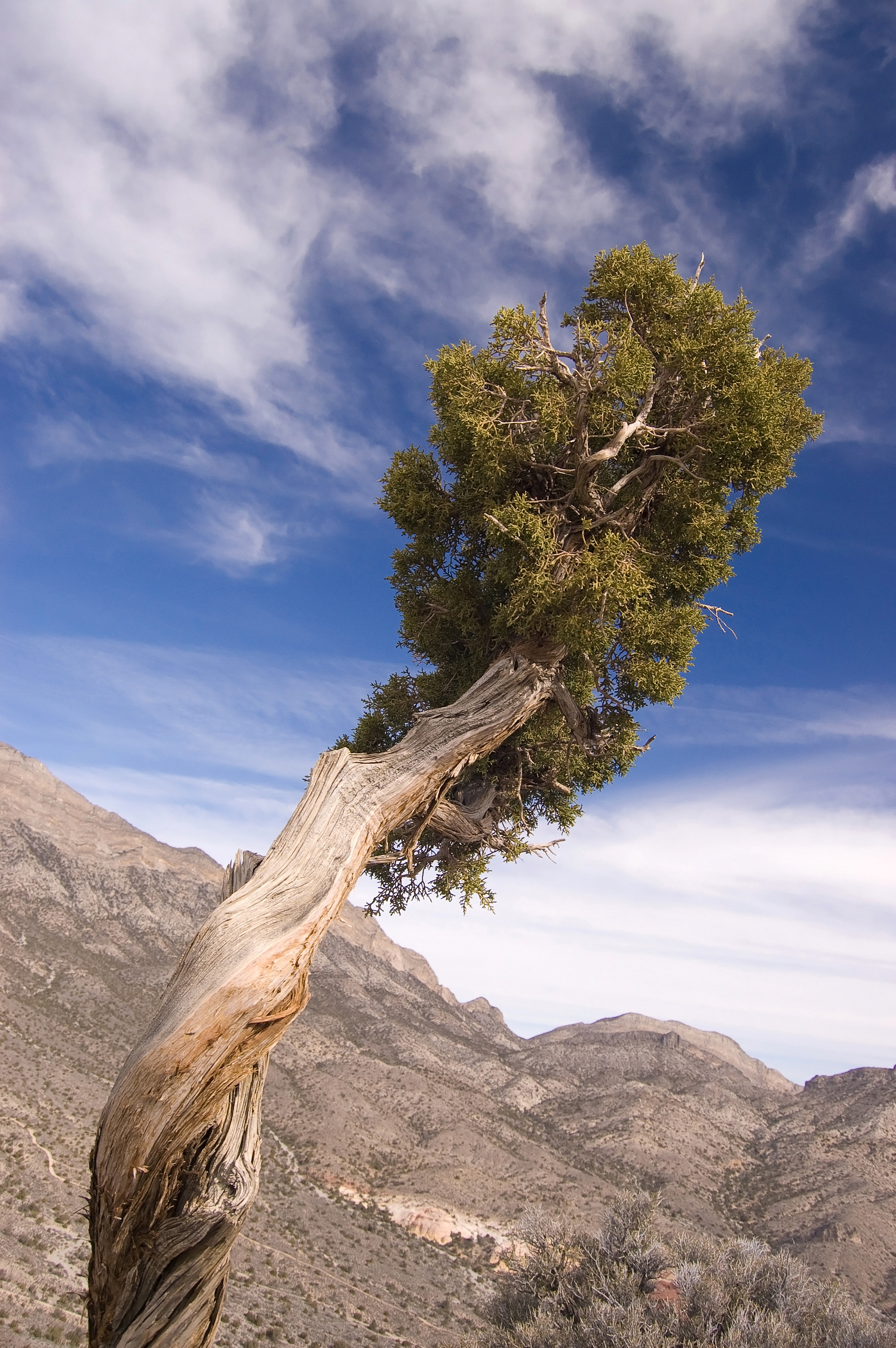

Conservation status
- Least Concern (IUCN 3.1)

- Secure (NatureServe)

Scientific classification
- Kingdom: Plantae
- Clade: Tracheophytes
- Clade: Gymnosperms
- Division: Pinophyta
- Class: Pinopsida
- Order: Cupressales
- Family: Cupressaceae
- Genus: Juniperus
- Species: J. osteosperma

Binomial name
- Juniperus osteosperma (Torr.) Little, 1948
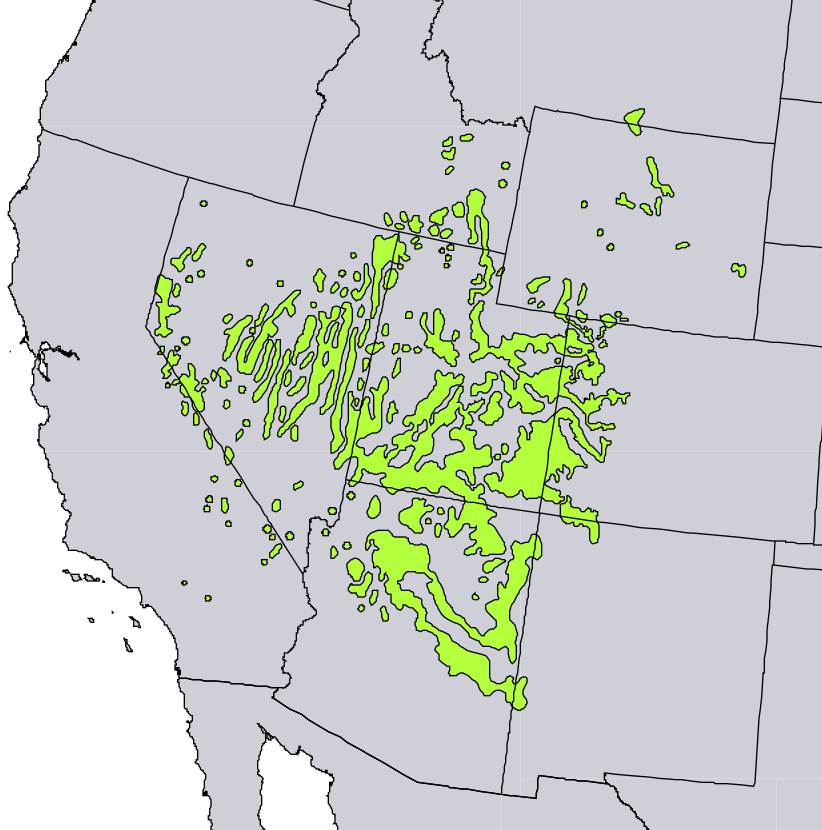
- Natural range

Synonyms
- List: Juniperus californica subsp. osteosperma (Torr.) A.E.Murray (1982); Juniperus californica var. osteosperma (Torr.) L.D.Benson (1981); Juniperus californica var. utahensis Engelm. (1877); Juniperus cosnino Lemmon (1902); Juniperus knightii A.Nelson (1898); Juniperus megalocarpa Sudw. (1907); Juniperus monosperma var. knightii (A.Nelson) Lemmon (1900); Juniperus occidentalis var. utahensis (Engelm.) A.H.Kent (1881); Juniperus tetragona var. osteosperma Torr. (1857); Juniperus utahensis (Engelm.) Lemmon (1890); Juniperus utahensis var. cosnino Lemmon (1902); Juniperus utahensis var. megalocarpa (Sudw.) Sarg. (1919); Sabina knightii (A.Nelson) Rydb. (1905); Sabina megalocarpa (Sudw.) Cockerell (1908); Sabina osteosperma (Torr.) Antoine (1857); Sabina utahensis (Engelm.) Rydb. (1905)

= Juniperus osteosperma =

Utah juniper

Western North American species of juniper

Juniperus osteosperma (Utah juniper; syn. J. utahensis) is a shrub or small tree native to the southwestern United States.

== Description ==
The plant reaches 3–6 meters (9 ft 10 in – 19 ft 8 in), rarely to 9 m, tall. The shoots are fairly thick compared to most junipers, 1.5–2 millimetres (1/16–3/32 in) in diameter. The leaves are arranged in opposite decussate pairs or whorls of three; the adult leaves are scale-like, 1–2 mm long (to 5 mm on lead shoots) and 1–1.5 mm broad. The juvenile leaves (on young seedlings only) are needle-like, 5–10 mm (3/16–13/32 in) long. The cones are berry-like, 8–13 mm (5/16–1/2 in) in diameter, blue-brown with a whitish waxy bloom, and contain a single seed (rarely two); they mature in about 18 months and are eaten by birds and small mammals. The male cones are 2–4 mm long, and shed their pollen in early spring. It is mostly monoecious with both sexes on the same plant, but around 10% of plants are dioecious, producing cones of only one sex.

The plants frequently bear numerous galls caused by the juniper tip midge Oligotrophus betheli (Bibionomorpha: Cecidomyiidae); these are conspicuous pale violet-purple, produced in clusters of 5–20 together, each gall 1–2 centimetres (3/8–3/4 in) in diameter, with dense modified spreading scale-leaves 6–10 mm (1/4–3/8 in) long and 2–3 mm broad at the base.

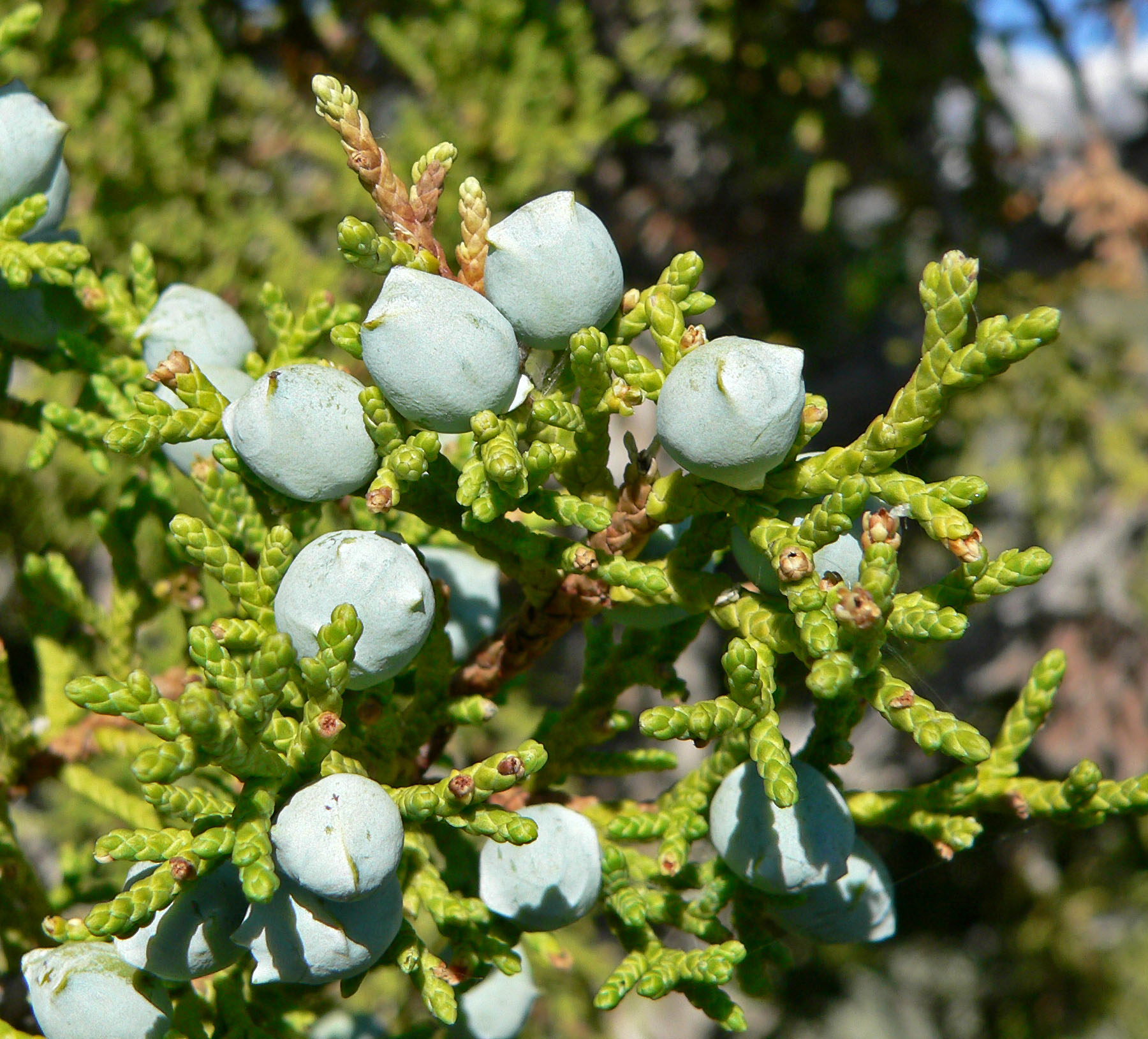
J. osteosperma leaves, female and male cones

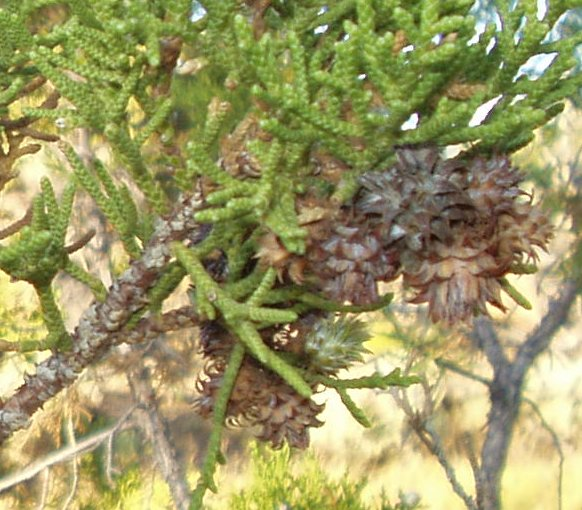
Utah Juniper galls

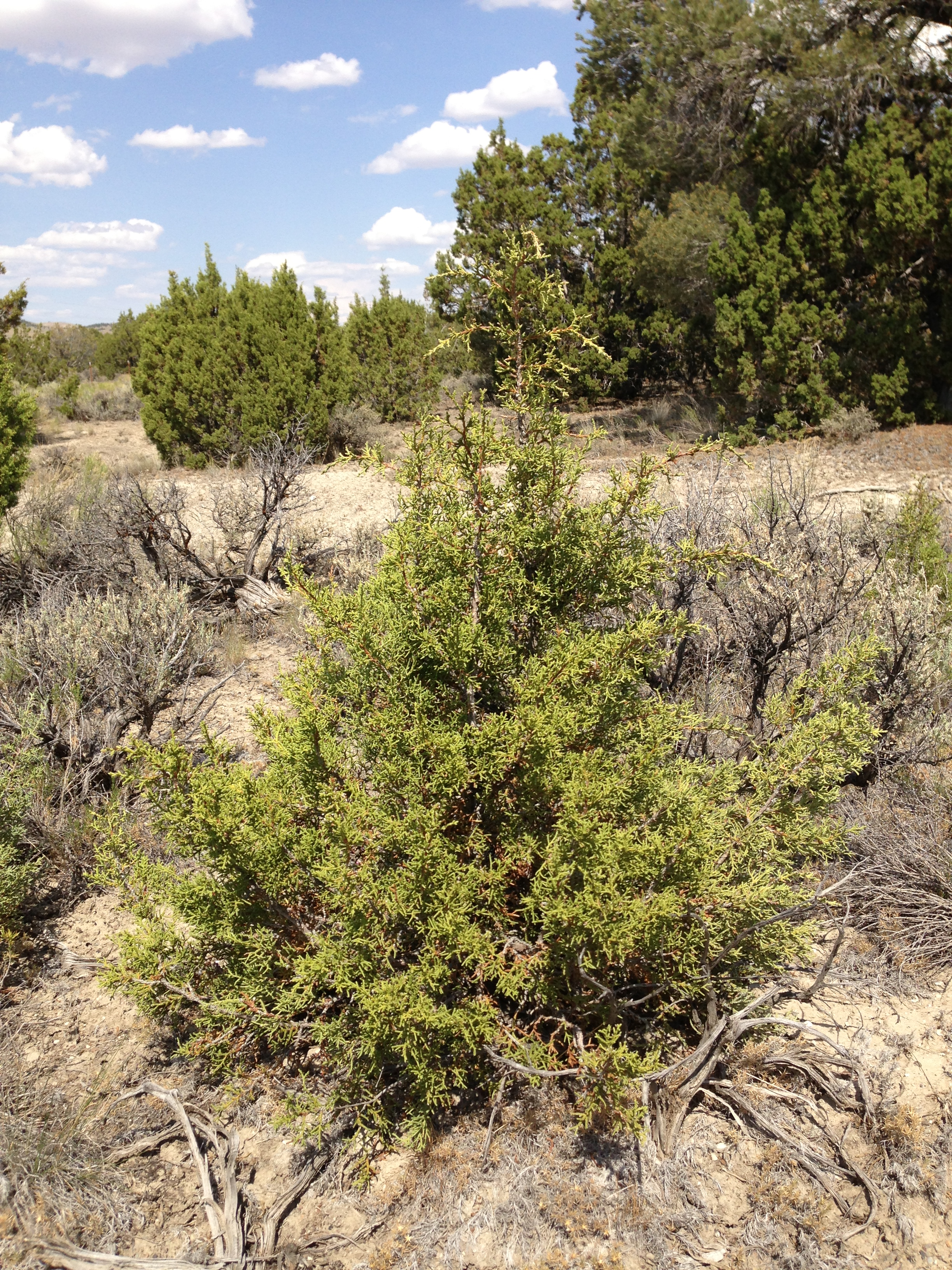
Seedling in northeastern Nevada

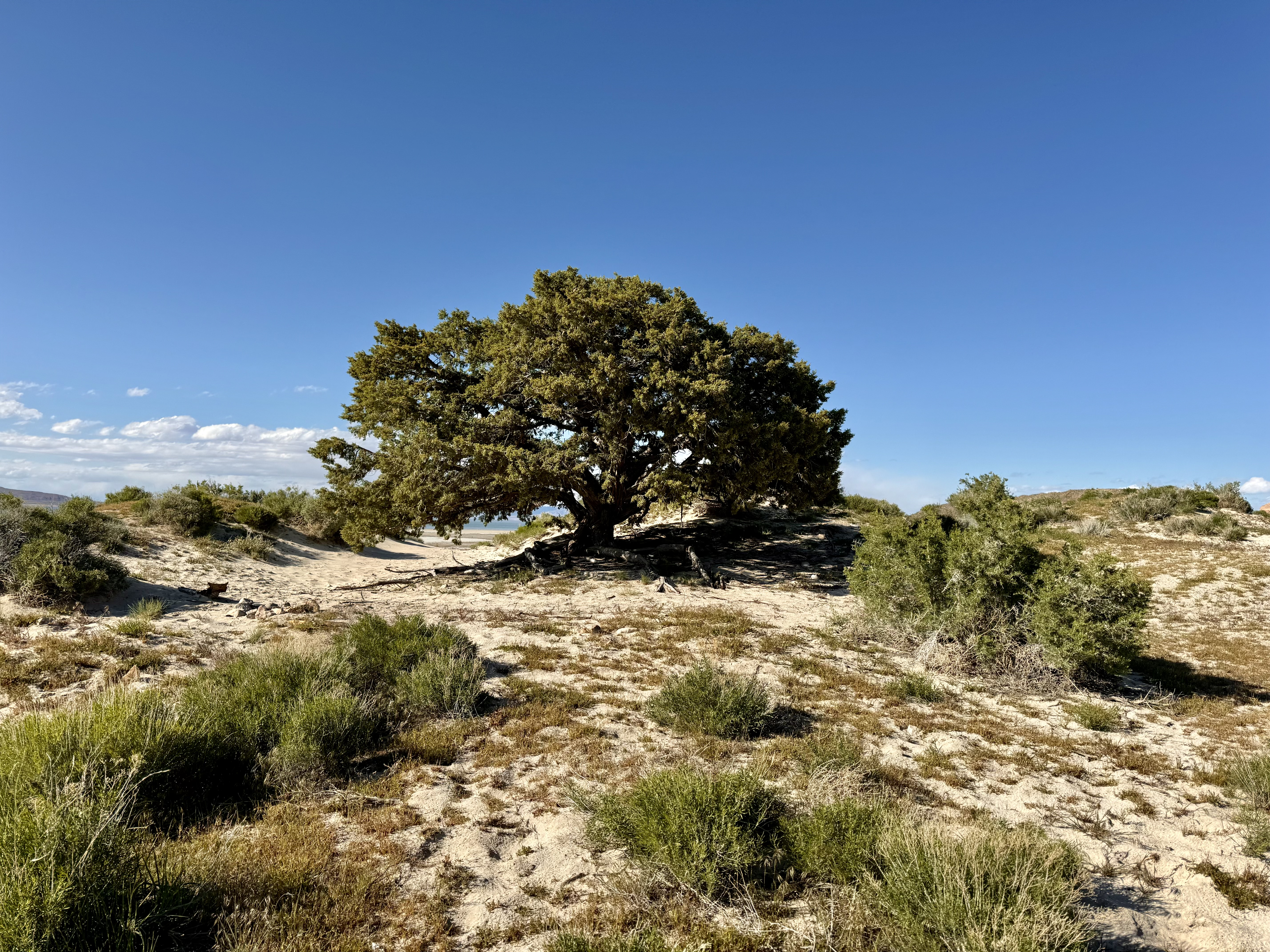
Juniperus osteosperma on the northwest shore of Stansbury Island

== Distribution and habitat ==
The species is native to the southwestern United States, in Utah, Nevada, Arizona, western New Mexico, western Colorado, Wyoming, southern Montana, southern Idaho and eastern California. It grows at moderate altitudes of 1,300–2,600 m (4,300–8,500 ft), on dry soils, often together with Pinus monophylla.

== Ecology ==
Seeds are dispersed by a variety of mammals and birds. Mammals include jackrabbits (mostly the black-tailed jackrabbit Lepus californicus spp.) rodents and to a lesser extent by coyotes (Canis latrans). Most notable among the birds that disperse juniper berries is the Townsend's solitaire (Myadestes townsendi).

== Uses ==
Native Americans such as the Havasupai used the bark for a variety of purposes, including beds, and ate the cones both fresh and in cakes. The Havasupai used the gum to make a protective covering over wounds. Additionally, the Yavapai gave their women a tea made from the leaves to calm their contractions after giving birth, and fumigated them with smoke from the leaves placed over hot coals. The Navajo sweep their tracks with boughs from the trees so death will not follow them.

A small quantity of ripe berries can be eaten as an emergency food or as a sage-like seasoning for meat. The dried berries can be roasted and ground into a coffee substitute.

Utah juniper is an aromatic plant. Essential oil extracted from the trunk and limb is prominent in α-pinene, δ-3-carene, and cis-thujopsene. Essential oil extracted from the leaf is prominent in camphor and bornyl acetate. The trunk of Utah juniper retains essential oil for at least 20 years after the tree dies, and is prominent in cedrol and cis-thujopsene.

== See also ==
- Pinyon–juniper woodland
