= Oras Sattar =

Iraqi singer

Oras Sattar أوراس ستار
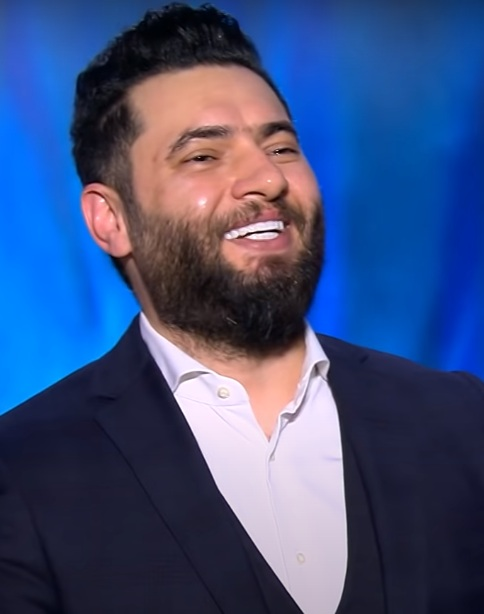
- Oras Sattar performing at 2019 Souq Waqif Festival, Doha, Qatar

Background information
- Born: Oras Sattar; July 29, 1981 (age 44)
- Origin: Baghdad, Ba'athist Iraq
- Genres: Classical crossover, Arab pop, operatic pop, baroque pop, folk pop, world
- Occupation(s): Musician, composer, singer, songwriter
- Years active: 2009–present
- Labels: AL-Qethara; Music Al Remas TV

Oras Sattar (Arabic: أوراس ستار; born July 29, 1981, in Baghdad, Iraq), is an Iraqi singer, composer and songwriter.

== Discography ==
=== Singles ===
- 2010: A3len Et-tawbah
- 2011: Hobbi Whanany
- 2011: Fedwa Fedwa
- 2011: Hananak
- 2012: 3ala Mayyah
- 2012: Ana Ahebak
- 2014: Makw Qesmah
- 2015: Shetsawy Sawy
- 2016: Enty Ommy
- 2016: Ekhtareet Gheery
- 2016: Wallah Ma Naseek
- 2017: Ya Jamalak
- 2017: Hob Majnoon
- 2017: Ya Tery

== See also ==
- List of best-selling music artists
