= Ora Larthard =

American cellist

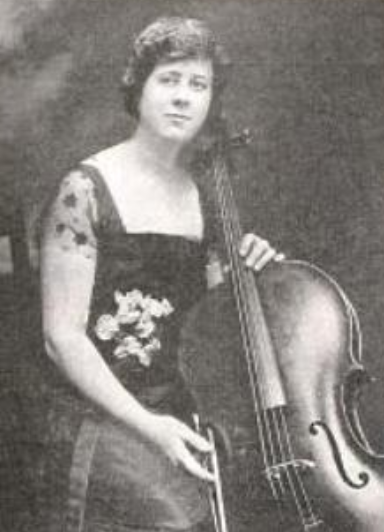
- Ora Larthard, from a 1923 publication
- Born: Ora Taylor Larthard; May 10, 1889; Malden, Massachusetts, U.S.
- Died: July 8, 1974 (age 85); Rockport, Massachusetts, U.S.
- Other names: Ora Woodman, Ora Dean
- Occupation: Cellist

Ora Taylor Larthard Dean (May 10, 1889 – July 8, 1974) was an American cellist and music educator. She was based in Massachusetts for most of her life, but taught and performed in Michigan in the 1920s.

== Early life and education ==
Larthard was from Malden, Massachusetts, the daughter of William Larthard and Eleanor Gertrude Taylor Larthard (later Woodman). Her father was from Prince Edward Island, and her maternal grandparents were born in Nova Scotia. She studied cello with Josef Adamowski (brother of Boston violinist Timothee Adamowski), and graduated from the New England Conservatory of Music in 1916. She was a member of Mu Phi Epsilon. While she was a student, in 1914, she played at a Boston memorial service for cellist and composer David Popper.

== Career ==
Larthard played at a benefit concert for the Malden Red Cross Society in 1918. She taught at the Wilde Conservatory of Music in Lansing, Michigan. and at Albion College School of Music. She was head of the cello department at the University of Michigan's School of Music. With violinist Stanislaw Samuelewicz and pianist Fred Lewis, she was a member of the Ann Arbor Trio.

By 1930 she was living in Malden again, with her grandmother, mother, and sister's family. In Massachusetts she was a member of the Mereminska Trio, with Margaret Clark, violinist, and Françoise Mereminska, pianist. She continued to perform as a cellist, often for women's groups or charity fundraisers, through the 1940s, and into the 1950s.

== Personal life ==
Larthard married Robert Chalfant Dean. Her husband died in 1949. She died in 1974, at the age of 85, in Rockport, Massachusetts.
