= Ora, daughter of Ur =

Biblical figure

Ora
- Spouse: Reu
- Children: Serug
- Parent: Ur bin Kesed

Ora (Hebrew: ערה; Ge'ez: አራ; fl. 20th century AM) was the wife of Reu, and the mother of Serug, according to the Book of Jubilees. She is consequently the paternal great-great-grandmother of Abraham, therefore an ancestor of the Israelites and Ishmaelites.

The Book of Jubilees further implies that Arphaxad is the grandfather of Ur, as the immediate progenitor of Ur, son of Kesed, making Arphaxad the great-grandfather of Ora. This makes Ora a great-great-great granddaughter of Noah and Naamah. This also makes Ora and her husband Reu second cousins twice removed.

In the Book of Jubilees, she is described as giving birth to Serug "in the seventh year of this week in this jubilee.", which has been identified as 1820 AM according to Masoretic chronology.

== Etymology ==
Ora's Hebrew name, ערה, means "to lay bare" or "pour out". In addition, she shares a name identical with that of 'Ara, a village in Northern Israel, established some time during the Bronze Age.

In addition, Ora's paternal line, Ur, son of Kasdim, is the same as Ur Kasdim, the birthplace of Abraham. It is stated in the Book of Jubilees that the city was founded by Ur.

Ancestors of Ora, daughter of Ur

Noah
Shem
Naamah
Arphaxad
Sedeqetelebab
Kesed
Elam
Susan
Rasu'aya
Ur
Ura
