= Oriental Rug Retailers of America =

The Oriental Rug Retailers of America (ORRA) is a non-profit organization that was founded over 40 years ago to promote ethical practices in the Oriental rug business. The organization provides member and consumer education as well as specialized Oriental rug appraiser certifications. The goal of ORRA is to combat the spread of misinformation about and the misrepresentation of hand-woven rugs. Every member is required to adhere to a Code of Ethics regarding business practices.

ORRA's certification program and screening of reputable dealers the professional association support the financial value of investments in oriental rugs. Kiplinger's, an investor magazine, recommends to rug investors that they purchase from ORRA-certified dealers, while noting that stocks should do better as investments.

In 1988 the organization was based in Medford, Oregon and its Executive Director was Otto Ewaldsen, who had retired from other business and was pursuing the provision of information about oriental rugs. At the time about 500 retailers were certified by ORRA.
