= Ora F. Porter =

American nurse (1879–1970)

Ora Frances Porter
- Born: October 15, 1879; Sugar Grove, Kentucky
- Died: February 4, 1970 (aged 90)
- Education: Tuskegee University
- Occupation: Nurse
- Known for: First Registered Nurse in Kentucky

Ora Frances Porter (1879–1970) was an influential figure in Bowling Green's African-American community, one of the earliest registered nurses in Warren County, Kentucky, and was the first African American Butler County native to earn a college degree. She is memorialized on a Kentucky historical marker.

== Biography ==
She was born October 15, 1879, the daughter of Sarah J. Porter in Sugar Grove, Butler County, Kentucky. She moved to Bowling Green at the age of 10. Her long-time residence there was a home located between 7th and College Streets across from Cecilia Memorial Presbyterian Church.

She earned her nursing degree in Alabama at the Tuskegee University School of Nursing. By doing so, she became "the first African American Butler County native to earn a college degree."

Earning a nursing education was difficult for African Americans at that time, according to Sowada.

"During an era when jobs for African American women were primarily limited to domestic service, Porter graduated from Tuskegee Institute’s School of Nursing in 1904. Tuskegee’s School of Nursing opened in 1892, shortly after the first nursing schools for white women were founded in 1873 and the first nursing school for African American women was founded in 1881."

Following graduation, she returned to Bowling Green to serve as one two registered nurses at the private St. Joseph Hospital, which was operated by the McCormack brother doctors. She became an employee of the State Board of Health Laboratory, directed by Dr. Lillian South. Finally, she became a private care nurse.

She retired in 1960 but even after that, she continued to offer substitute care for registered nurses at Bowling Green's City-County Hospital as needed.

She was an organizer of the George Washington Carver Community Center, a local Interracial Commission after World War II. Porter also helped found the 1949 Interracial Commission. She died on February 4, 1970, and was buried in Mount Moriah Cemetery.

=== Honors ===
A historical marker #2149 was erected in Bowling Green on College Street. At the dedication, 35 years after her death, the president of the Warren County Medical Society said, "We in the medical community think she is the first (registered) nurse ever in the state of Kentucky."

=== Legacy ===
Robert J. Gates conducted an oral history interview with Porter's nieces, Alice Ruth and Shella Proctor. The file and recordings are available at Western Kentucky University, Manuscripts and Folklife Archives.
