= Cedrene =

(−)-α-cedrene

Names
- IUPAC name Cedr-8-ene
- Systematic IUPAC name (3R,3aS,7S,8aS)-3,6,8,8-Tetramethyl-2,3,4,7,8,8a-hexahydro-1H-3a,7-methanoazulene

Identifiers
CAS Number	11028-42-5; 469-61-4 (α); 546-28-1 (β)
3D model (JSmol)	Interactive image
Beilstein Reference	2207578
ChEBI	CHEBI:10216
ChemSpider	4936353
ECHA InfoCard	100.031.131
EC Number	234-257-7
KEGG	C09630
PubChem CID	6431015
UNII	1M4BF4O9SA; 50D4A81G8T (α); 6QL7ERD5Q1 (β)
- InChI: InChI=1S/C15H24/c1-10-7-8-15-9-12(10)14(3,4)13(15)6-5-11(15)2/h7,11-13H,5-6,8-9H2,1-4H3/t11-,12+,13+,15+/m1/s1 Key: IRAQOCYXUMOFCW-OSFYFWSMSA-N; InChI=1/C15H24/c1-10-7-8-15-9-12(10)14(3,4)13(15)6-5-11(15)2/h7,11-13H,5-6,8-9H2,1-4H3/t11-,12+,13+,15+/m1/s1 Key: IRAQOCYXUMOFCW-OSFYFWSMBF
- SMILES: C[C@@H]1CC[C@@H]2[C@]13CC=C([C@H](C3)C2(C)C)C

Properties
Chemical formula	C_{15}H_{24}
Molar mass	204.357 g·mol^{−1}
Density	0.932 g/mL at 20 °C
Boiling point	261–262 °C

Hazards
- GHS labelling
Pictograms	(GHS02: Flammable) (GHS08: Health hazard) (GHS09: Environmental hazard)
Signal word	Danger
Hazard statements	H226, H304, H410
Precautionary statements	P210, P233, P240, P241, P242, P243, P273, P280, P301+P310, P303+P361+P353, P331, P370+P378, P391, P403+P235, P405, P501
- Except where otherwise noted, data are given for materials in their standard state (at 25 °C [77 °F], 100 kPa). Infobox references

(+)-β-cedrene

Names
- IUPAC name Cedr-8(15)-ene
- Systematic IUPAC name (3R,3aS,7S,8aS)-3,6,8,8-Tetramethyl-6-methylideneoctahydro-1H-3a,7-methanoazulene

Identifiers
CAS Number	546-28-1
3D model (JSmol)	Interactive image
ChemSpider	9281621
ECHA InfoCard	100.031.131
PubChem CID	11106485
UNII	6QL7ERD5Q1
- InChI: InChI=1S/C15H24/c1-10-7-8-15-9-12(10)14(3,4)13(15)6-5-11(15)2/h11-13H,1,5-9H2,2-4H3/t11-,12+,13+,15+/m1/s1 Key: DYLPEFGBWGEFBB-OSFYFWSMSA-N; InChI=1/C15H24/c1-10-7-8-15-9-12(10)14(3,4)13(15)6-5-11(15)2/h11-13H,1,5-9H2,2-4H3/t11-,12+,13+,15+/m1/s1 Key: DYLPEFGBWGEFBB-OSFYFWSMBA
- SMILES: C[C@@H]1CC[C@@H]2[C@]13CCC(=C)[C@H](C3)C2(C)C

Properties
Chemical formula	C_{15}H_{24}
Molar mass	204.357 g·mol^{−1}
Density	0.932 g/mL at 20 °C
Boiling point	263–264 °C
- Except where otherwise noted, data are given for materials in their standard state (at 25 °C [77 °F], 100 kPa). Infobox references

Cedrene is a sesquiterpene found in the essential oil of cedar. The two isomers present in the oil are (−)-α-cedrene and (+)-β-cedrene, which differ in the position of a double bond.

== Uses ==
Used in various perfumes and fragrances to produce a woody scent.

== See also ==
- Cedrol, another component of cedar oil
- Logic of Organic Synthesis (Rao)
