= Ora Eddleman Reed =

American writer (1880–1968)

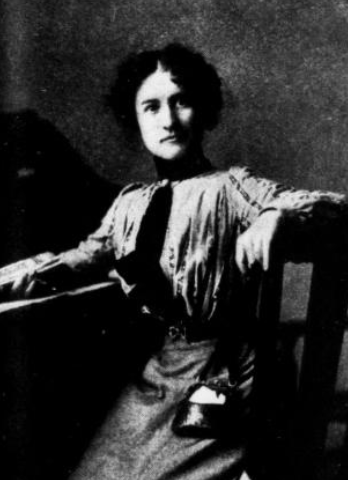
- Ora Eddleman (later Reed), from a 1902 publication
- Born: Ora Veralyn Eddleman; September 17, 1880; Texas, U.S.
- Died: June 19, 1968 (aged 87); Tulsa, Oklahoma, U.S.
- Other names: Mignon Schreiber, Tucheta
- Occupations: Writer, editor

Ora Veralyn Eddleman Reed (September 17, 1880 – June 19, 1968), also known as Tucheta or Mignon Schreiber, was an American writer, editor and radio host. Though not officially enrolled, she is usually associated with the Cherokee Nation in Oklahoma, a connection she embraced in her writings and social interactions.

== Early life and education ==
Eddleman was born near Denton, Texas, the daughter of David Jones Eddleman and Mary Jane Daugherty Eddleman. Mary Daugherty Eddleman identified as Cherokee and Irish by ancestry, but her 1908 application to be officially enrolled in the Cherokee Nation was rejected by the Dawes Commission. Ora V. Eddleman followed her mother's example in her public presentation as a Cherokee woman, and she maintained a "lifelong connection to Cherokee leaders and to the larger Cherokee community". She attended Henry Kendall College in Muskogee, Indian Territory (now Oklahoma), but left school to help with her family's newspaper business.

== Career ==
Eddleman's family owned the Muskogee Daily Times, and she worked at the newspaper as a young woman. She was a co-founder and editor of Twin Territories: The Indian Magazine, a monthly publication, from 1898 to 1904. From 1905 to 1906, she edited the "Indian Department" of Sturm's Oklahoma Magazine. Her columns were noted for their humor. She also wrote short stories under the name "Mignon Schreiber". She published and promoted works by Native American authors including Mabel Washbourne Anderson, Charles Gibson, John Rollin Ridge, and Alexander Posey. She wrote an unpublished novel, Where the Big Woods Beckon, and an unadapted screenplay, Night Brings Out the Stars.

Reed was an active member of the Indian Territory Press Association. She was president of the Yellowstone chapter of the United Daughters of the Confederacy in 1929 and 1931. She was also a member of the Daughters of the American Revolution, and the Oklahoma Historical Society. She became active in radio in Casper, Wyoming, in the 1930s, hosting a half-hour talk show and dispensing advice as "the Sunshine Lady". She has been described as "the first Native American broadcaster" and "the first Native American talk show host".

== Publications ==
- "Lucy and I as Missionaries" and "Only an Indian Girl" (1900, Twin Territories, stories; as Mignon Schreiber)
- Status of Indian Schools (1902, report)
- "Great Works of an Indian" (1906, Sturm's, article)
- "The Indian Orphan" (1908, Sturm's)
- "Modern Mistress Lo" (1908, Harper's Bazaar, article)
- "Billy Bearclaws, Aid to Cupid" (1909, story)
- "Daughters of the Confederacy" (1910, Sturm's)
- "A Toast" (1914, short poem)
- "Pioneer Publisher, First Daily in Indian Country" (1945, The Chronicles of Oklahoma)
- "The Robe Family: Missionaries" (1948, The Chronicles of Oklahoma)
- "What the Curious Want to Know" (a regular column in Twin Territories)
- "Types of Indian Girls" (a regular feature in Twin Territories)

== Personal life and legacy ==
Eddleman married fellow journalist Charles L. Reed in 1904; they had two sons, Roy and David, and two more children who died in infancy. Her husband worked for the Bureau of Indian Affairs, and as a scout for oil companies. The Reeds moved to Wyoming in 1924, and back to Oklahoma in 1932. Her husband died in 1949, and she died in 1968, at the age of 87, at a nursing home in Tulsa. A collection of her selected works was published in 2024 by the University of Nebraska Press. The University of Oklahoma has a microfilm run of Eddleman's Twin Territories.
