= Office of Religious Affairs =

U.S. government office

Agency overview
- Formed: September 30, 2026; 33 days ago
- Agency executive: Director, Office of Religious Affairs
- Parent department: United States Department of Defense

The Office of Religious Affairs (ORA) is an office within the United States Department of Defense established in September 2026 to address the religious needs of US service members, including to "protect budgets, demand infrastructure, and strengthen religious support."

== History ==
The establishment of the Office of Religious Affairs was announced by Secretary of Defense Pete Hegseth during his September 30, 2026 "State of the Force" address in Quantico, Virginia. In the speech, Hegseth said, "Cutting-edge technology … new basing and bases … and a better educational pipeline are still incomplete without the most essential component of our republic: faith."

In a memo dated September 30, 2026, Hegseth outlined the structure of the ORA, with its director reporting directly to the Secretary of Defense.

== Reception ==
On September 30, 2026, Americans United for Separation of Church and State issued a statement condemning Hegseth's announcement of the ORA, writing, "Hegseth’s latest announcement violates that promise by elevating Christianity to an even higher role in shaping U.S. military policy."
