= Cedrol =

Names
- IUPAC name 8α-Cedran-8β-ol
- Systematic IUPAC name (3R,3aS,6R,7R,8aS)-3,6,8,8-Tetramethyloctahydro-1H-3a,7-methanoazulen-6-ol

Identifiers
| CAS Number | 77-53-2 |
| 3D model (JSmol) | Interactive image |
| ChEMBL | ChEMBL1974890 |
| ChemSpider | 59018 |
| ECHA InfoCard | 100.000.942 |
| PubChem CID | 65575 |
| UNII | 63ZM9703BO |
| CompTox Dashboard (EPA) | DTXSID1041269 |
- InChI: InChI=1S/C15H26O/c1-10-5-6-11-13(2,3)12-9-15(10,11)8-7-14(12,4)16/h10-12,16H,5-9H2,1-4H3/t10-,11+,12-,14-,15+/m1/s1 Key: SVURIXNDRWRAFU-OGMFBOKVSA-N
- SMILES: O[C@@]2(CC[C@]31[C@@H](CC[C@H]1C)C([C@H]2C3)(C)C)C

Properties
| Chemical formula | C_{15}H_{26}O |
| Molar mass | 222.372 g·mol^{−1} |
| Density | 1.01 g/mL |
| Melting point | 86 to 87 °C (187 to 189 °F; 359 to 360 K) |
| Boiling point | 273 °C (523 °F; 546 K) |
- Except where otherwise noted, data are given for materials in their standard state (at 25 °C [77 °F], 100 kPa). Infobox references

Cedrol is a sesquiterpene alcohol found in the essential oil of conifers (cedar oil), especially in the genera Cupressus (cypress) and Juniperus (juniper). It has also been identified in Origanum onites, a plant related to oregano. Its main uses are in the chemistry of aroma compounds. It makes up about 19% of cedarwood oil Texas and 15.8% of cedarwood oil Virginia.

Cedrol has not been proven to be toxic in humans. It has been shown to have antioxidant and antiinflammatory along with other beneficial effects. In skin sensitization tests 2/20 people showed negative effects, and on the second test there was no sensitivity found. This compound and ones similar have been found to have antiseptic, anti-inflammatory, antispasmodic, tonic, astringent, diuretic, sedative, insecticidal, and antifungal activities in vitro. These compounds are used globally in traditional medicine and cosmetics. Results of a 2015 study suggest that cedrol strongly attracts pregnant female mosquitoes after they have fed, which can be used to create cedrol-baited traps.

== See also ==
- Cedrene, another component of cedar oil
