= Organic residue analysis =

Investigation of microscopic remains on archaeological artefacts

In archaeology, Organic Residue Analysis (ORA) refers to the study of micro-remains trapped in or adhered to artifacts from the past. These organic residues can include lipids, proteins, starches, and sugars. By analyzing these residues, ORA can reveal insights into ancient dietary behaviors, agricultural practices, housing organization, technological advancements, and trade interactions. Furthermore, it provides information on the use of cosmetics, arts, crafts, medicine, and burial preparations in ancient societies.

ORA's broad applicability encompasses a variety of amorphous materials such as substances used in mummification, pastes, glues, binders, and colorants. These materials can be preserved in pottery, stone tools, the mineral matrix of bones, dental calculus, as well as in habitation floors or pits. The unique value of ORA lies in its ability to provide direct evidence of the materials and substances utilized by ancient peoples, often offering insights that other archaeological techniques cannot.

For instance, analyzing organic residues in pottery can disclose specific dietary components, such as animal and plant fats, shedding light on ancient dietary habits and food sources. Similarly, the study of ancient adhesives and pigments can enhance our understanding of the production techniques and materials used in ancient art and craftsmanship.

Moreover, ORA plays a crucial role in uncovering ancient medical knowledge, cosmetic usage, and the processes involved in creating artworks and handicrafts. Utilizing modern chemical analysis techniques, ORA offers archaeologists a useful tool to directly explore and understand the daily lives, cultural practices, and technological progress of ancient societies.

== Organic residues ==
The makeup of an organic residue depends on the organic components that got absorbed, trapped, or attached to unglazed and porous materials, like pottery, crusts, wood, and stones. The formation of organic residues can occur during a wide range of pre- and post-depositional events, including food preparation, cooking, storage, transportation, reparation and sealing. Given the complexities of organic residues, they can be defined at five nested scales: tissues, cells, macromolecules (e.g. lipids, proteins, metabolites, DNA and starches), molecules (e.g. fatty and amino acids) and atoms (e.g. carbon, nitrogen and hydrogen). We're especially interested in the residues at the level of biomolecules, particularly fats and metabolic products, because of how well they can be preserved and their importance to archaeology. Discussions about proteins are covered elsewhere under the topic of Paleoproteomics.

=== Lipids ===
Lipids (lipos, gr. fat) are a class of biomolecules that mostly fall within the ester family and include fats and oils, waxes, terpenes, steroids, triglycerides (TAGs), free fatty acids, ketones, alcohols, dicarboxylic acids, bituminous substances and resins.

By definition, lipids are hydrophobic biomolecules. Fatty acids consist of long carbon chains with various lengths and double bonds, ending with a carboxyl group. In biological systems, most fatty acids have an even number of carbon atoms, mainly between C14 and C24, maximising at C16 and C18.

Waxes are simple esters of long-chain carboxylic acids and alcohols, fats and oils have a more complex structure. These are formed from triglycerides. Each triglyceride contains three long-chain carboxylic acids attached to a triester of 1,2,3-propantriol (glycerin). Typically, the fatty acids are unbranched and have an even number of carbon atoms. TAGs are important storage lipids and are the main constituent (~ 99%) of vegetable oils and food.

Lipids are hydrophobic and therefore cannot be 'washed out' or accidentally 'washed into' the matrix of an analysed material. The ceramic matrix serves as a protective environment which favours significant lipid preservation.

=== Metabolites ===
Metabolites are small organic molecules usually involved in metabolism either as a substrate or product. They can also refer to endogenous compounds, which includes organic acids, lipids, sugars, amino acids, and phenolic compounds, produced during metabolic processes. The field of metabolomics (Section 6) generally revolves around these molecules with a molecular weight between 50 – 1500 daltons (Da). Recently, the application of metabolomics in ancient residue analysis has been established where it was successfully used to determine distinct molecular residue markers in archaeological pottery.

== Development of the method ==
During the 1950s and 1960s, the emergence of chromatographic methods, especially those linking Gas Chromatography (GC) and Mass Spectrometry (MS), resulted in a methodology used to resolve and recognise molecules. One of the earliest papers using GC analysis applied to archaeological material was published by Thornton et al. (1970) and, investigated the composition of ancient bog butter.

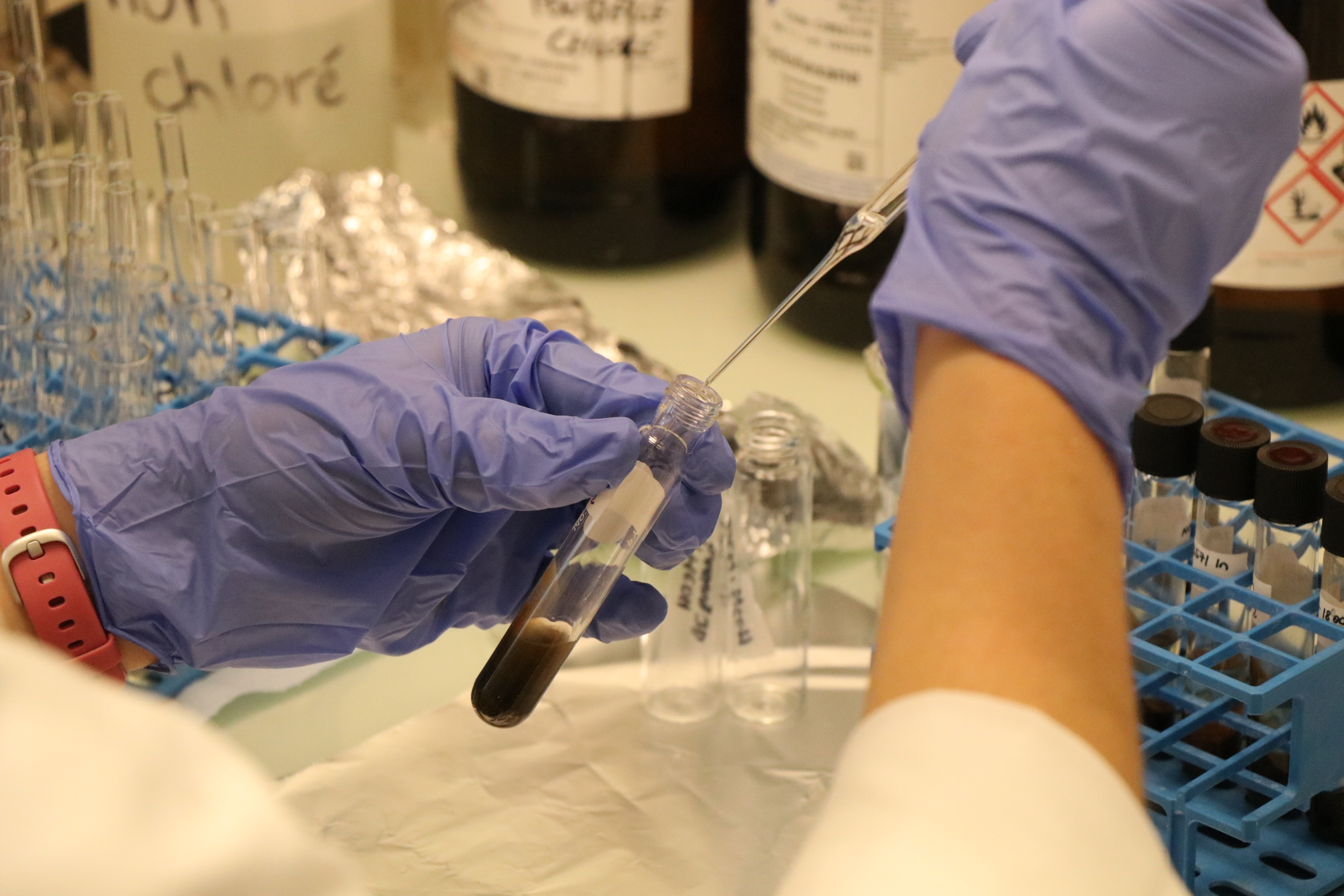
Demonstration of archaeological lipid extractions of ceramic powder.

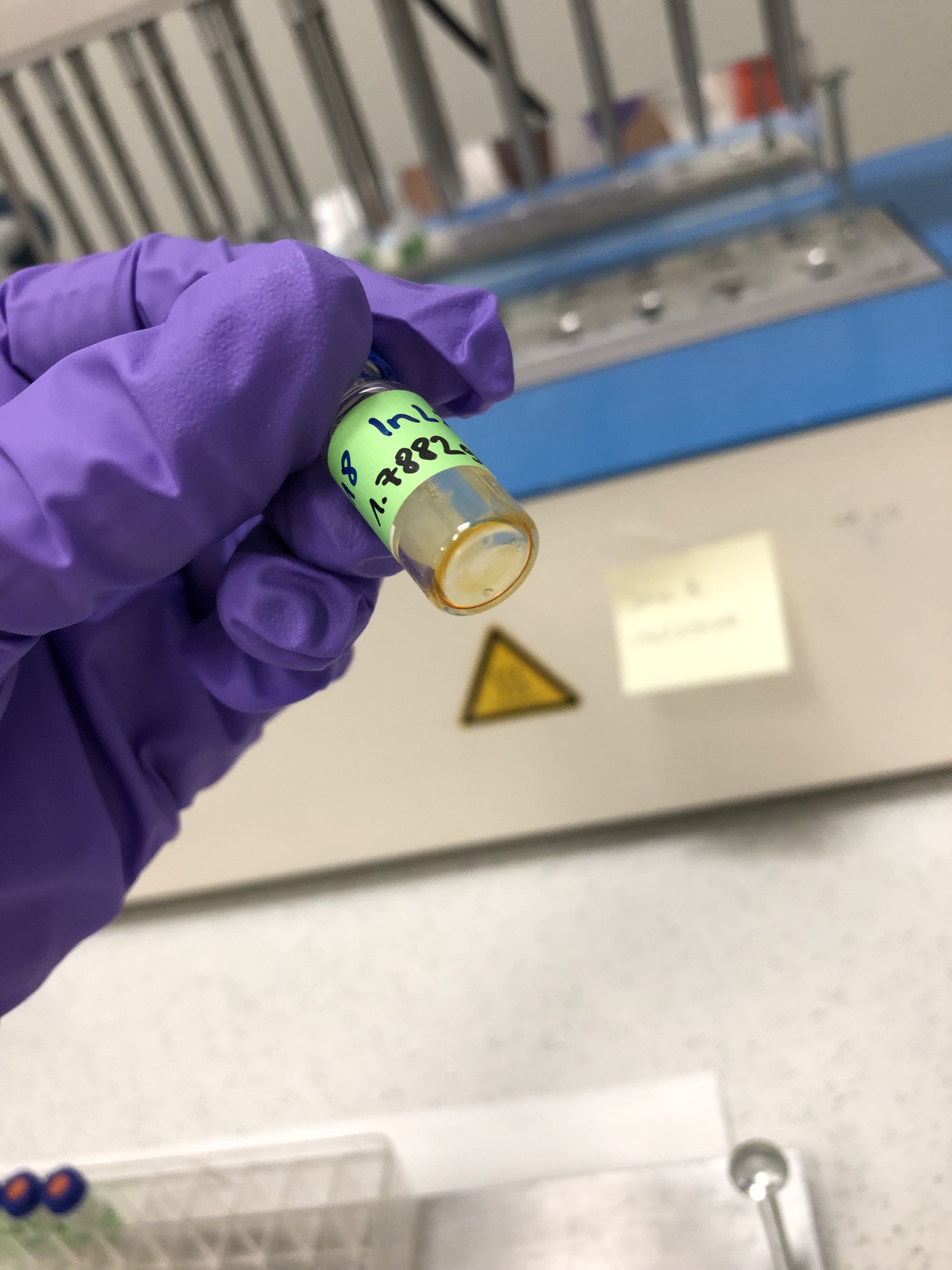
Example of extracted archaeological lipids from ceramic powder.

Scientists have developed different methods to study the various materials stuck in ancient pottery. A popular way to get these materials out involves using special liquids like chloroform and methanol to pull out fats that aren't tightly attached to the pottery. Then, they treat the samples with a process to prepare them for further analysis. They can also treat the pottery powder a second time to get fats that are more firmly attached, through strong chemical bonds. By doing this, they can learn even more about substances that break down differently. This helps them understand more about what ancient people might have stored or cooked in these pots.

A high-throughput protocol to extract both 'unbound' and 'bound' lipids was developed and published in 2014, using a direct acidified methanol extraction. This method results in a higher recovery of lipids. Compositional information is lost to hydrolysis of complex lipids, such as TAGs and wax esters.

Nowadays, it is possible to identify animal fats, plant waxes, resins and tars, wine, and beeswax. Modern studies of plant resins, consisting of di- and triterpernoids, show confident identification of these sources to the genus level and, sometimes even the botanic species. Other classes of specific plant lipids, such as hydrocarbons, ketones, alcohols and/or fatty acids, can also reveal the origins of resources.

When using selected ion monitoring (SIM) methods, a higher sensitivity of the GC-MS can be achieved, and thus, known compounds can be detected, e.g. cereal biomarkers (alkylresorcinols) and specific marine biomarkers.

Alkylresorcinols (ARs) are amphiphilic phenolic lipids characterised by a non-polar odd-numbered alkyl side chain attached to a polar resorcinol (1,3-dihydroxybenzene) ring. In the case of cereals, the alkyl chain ranges from 15 to 25 carbon atoms. These cereal biomarkers were previously found in a well-preserved Bronze Age wooden container from Switzerland, and coarse ware vessels from a Roman cavalry barrack at Vindolanda. The latter study demonstrated that the survival of ARs is highly dependent on the cooking procedures and burial conditions. However, if recoverable, analysis of these phenolic lipids in archaeological contexts is valuable as it can help explain the uptake and spread of cereal processing of past communities in particular regions.

Diagnostic compounds for marine resources, including ⍵-(o-alkylphenyl)alkanoic acids (APAAs) C18, C20 and C22, were recently observed in numerous archaeological potsherds and are degradation products of unsaturated fatty acids. These biomarkers were recently detected in Narva ceramics confirming the exploitation of marine resources during the Late Mesolithic period in Eastern Baltic as well as in Korean hunter-gatherer pottery demonstrating the process of marine resources to e.g. rendering aquatic fats.

Identification becomes more complex when dealing with animal fats and plant oils. Some consist mainly of polyunsaturated fatty acids, which rarely survive in the archaeological record. Through the degradation processes of hydrolysis, undiagnostic n-alkanoic acids form. By combining lipid biomarkers and compound specific isotope analysis of individual fatty acids, it becomes possible to differentiate between ruminant and non-ruminant adipose, and ruminant milk, but the method can also help differentiate between wild ruminants, chicken and detect maize.

Radiocarbon dating is a way to figure out how old things are by measuring a type of carbon found in materials. Compound-Specific Radiocarbon Analysis (CSRA) has been developed since the end of the 1990s and lately there has been some developments in the approach that contributed to address some dating questions with more reliability, and to shed light on the importance of pottery as a proxy for chronological assessments. CSRA has been applied by Casanova et al. to directly date palmitic (C_{16:0}) and stearic (C_{18:0}) fatty acids extracted from archaeological pottery belonging to different Neolithic sites in Europe, Africa, Anatolia and Saharan Africa. This study revealed that CSRA of pottery can shed light on multiple archaeological questions such as when the pottery was used, and thus understanding pottery typochronologies, and how old the organic residues are, allowing to discuss the beginning of the consumption of a specific resource. CSRA, used together with analysis of faunal assemblages has also been applied to investigate the consumption of marine products.

=== Development of analytical approaches ===
Since the 1950s, mass spectrometry (MS)-based techniques have been used to characterise lipids, proteins and metabolites. The underlying principle of MS is that charged molecules (ions) are characterised by their mass-to-charge ratios in electric or magnetic fields. Generally, there are four key components of any MS workflows: extraction, separation (gas or liquid chromatography), sources of ionisation (e.g. electron, electrospray (ESI) and chemical (CI) ionisation) and types of analysers (e.g. Quadrupole and Orbitrap). For hydrophobic lipids, they are extracted from biological or archaeological material with nonpolar solutions. In order to analyse the extracted organic compounds, analytical techniques that target the specific molecules are required. To identify possible mixtures of organic compounds, the use of chromatographic and/or mass spectrometric methods is imperative. This is achieved using Gas Chromatography-Mass Spectrometry (GC-MS) alongside other methods, including isotope ratio mass spectrometry (IRMS), various spectroscopies, such as infrared (FT-IR), Raman, nuclear magnetic resonance (NMR), and ultraviolet (UV), scanning electron microscopy (SEM) for imaging and elemental analysis by energy dispersive X-ray spectroscopy (EDX), X-ray diffraction (XRD), X-ray fluorescence (XRF), and high magnification light microscopy

The main chromatographic technique utilised for the identification of lipid molecules from food crusts and absorbed residues is GC-MS. In GC, the liquid sample is converted into vapour and the targeted lipids are separated on a capillary column with a specific polarity. The separation is based on the molecule's interaction with the mobile and stationary liquid phases. Larger lipids, such as triacylglycerols (TAGs) and wax esters, are analysed using high-temperature GC-MS (HTGC-MS) without any prior hydrolysis step. Meanwhile, a GC system coupled to a flame ionisation detector (FID) is widely used for the quantification of preserved lipids. One observed limitation of GC-based analysis is its inability to identify polar lipids (e.g., glycerophospholipids and D-galactosyl diacylglycerols), which are mainly found in cereals. To mitigate this drawback liquid chromatography (LC)-MS can be used.

The use of LC-MS has been extensively used for decades for lipidomics. Lipidomics, a branch of metabolomics, is the large-scale study of a complex mixture of lipids (commonly known as lipidome). This approach was used by Zhang et al. (2021) to assess the lipidomics profile of rice, and they identified 277 lipid groups. LC-MS applicability in archaeological pottery, however, is yet to be investigated.

A further distinction between different animal fats preserved in archaeological pottery can be achieved via compound-specific isotope analysis using gas chromatography-combustion-isotope ratio mass spectrometry (GC-C-IRMS) and bulk stable isotope analysis using elemental analysis-isotope ratio mass spectrometry (EA-IRMS). As mentioned earlier, these isotopic analyses enable the distinction between fat adipose from ruminant and non-ruminant animal, and ruminant dairy products. Moreover, they can also distinguish different fats from marine and terrestrial animals, and plants. GC-C-IRMS analysis of archaeological ceramics is mainly focused on the presence of palmitic (C_{16:0}) and stearic acid (C_{18:0}), making this type of analysis then a compound-specific one. By plotting the 𝛿^{13}C values of C_{16:0} against C_{18:0} in modern references and archaeological samples. The isotopic values of these fatty acids from different sources vary to some degree as a result of isotopic fractionation, distinguishing them from each other.

== Other considerations ==
The archaeological and ecological context is critical for the preservation of organic residues and their interpretation. Organic remains can be influenced by natural mixtures, as well as preservation and degradation processes. Natural mixtures can occur in addition to mixtures caused by human activity, such as food preparation or the use of sealants. Through the use, and later, the burial of archaeological material, the biomolecules can alter over time through mixing, charring, heating, microbial activity and burial conditions. As a result, structurally diagnostic biomarkers might occur only as fragments, which is why the study of decay is of fundamental importance. In addition, the evidence of zooarchaeological, archaeobotanical as well as other archaeological evidence related to the site and period must be considered

=== Degradation processes ===
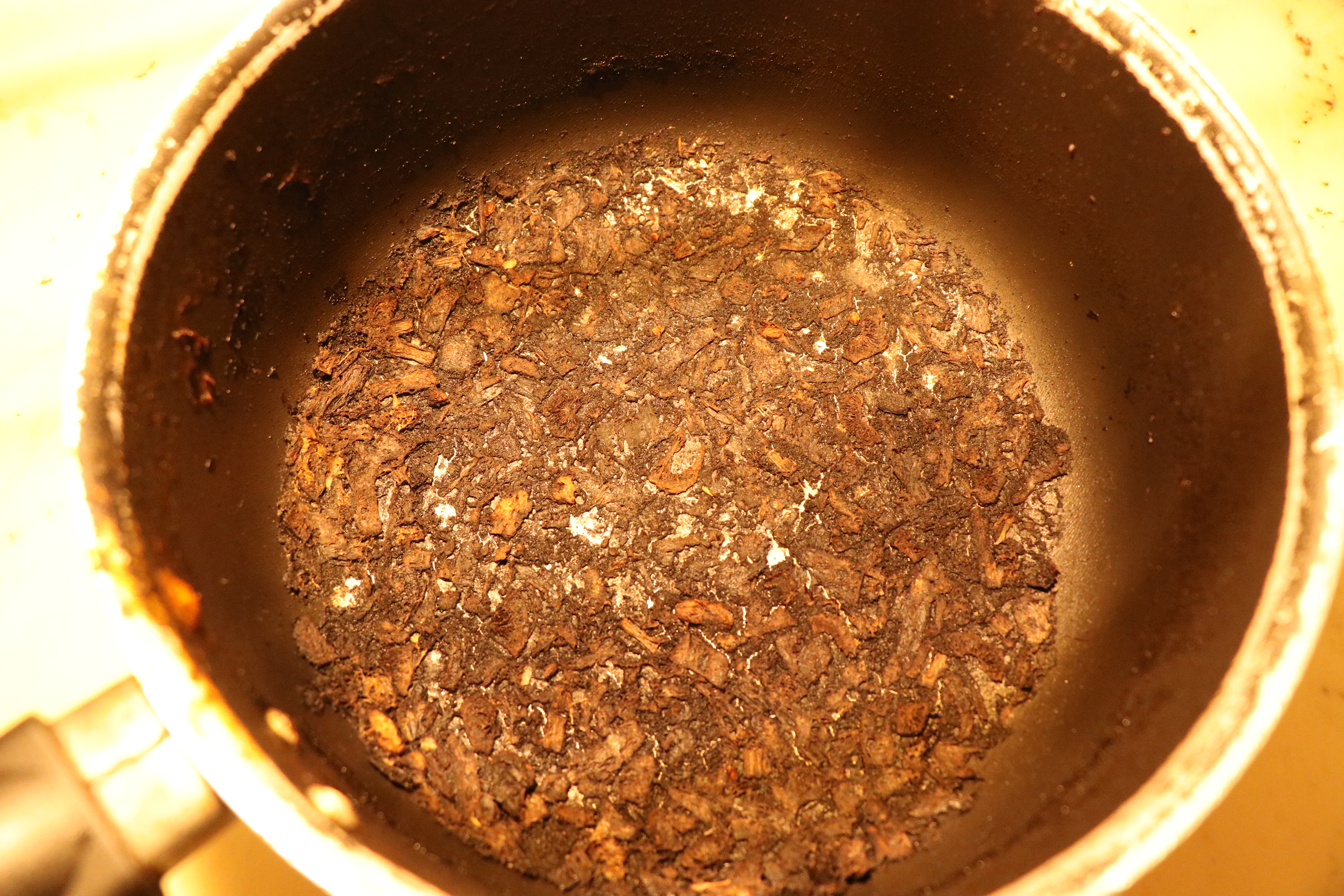
Modern charred food stuff in cooking pot, also known as food crust.

Some biomolecules are more profound to degradation than others (from lower to higher stability: DNA > Proteins > Amino acids > Lipids/Hydrocarbons). Furthermore, the preservation is affected by the material that the organic compounds are derived from, e.g. food crust, calcified deposit or ceramic matrix. Currently, it is not yet clear how homogenous food crusts as a find category are and if they are all formed in the same way. However, in general food crusts are understood to form through heating, and subsequent charring of foods, the organic preservation can be impacted by thermal alteration as well as microbial action due to the exposure to the burial environment... Calcified deposits are another form of residue found on ceramic vessels, which mainly consist of calcium rich compounds, such as calcium carbonate. Studies have succeeded in extracting both lipids and proteins from these calcified deposits and at least for proteins they seem to offer better preservational conditions. However, this type of residue is not yet frequently studied and little is known regarding its formation or its precise influence on biomolecular preservation. The ceramic matrix, however, is more likely to serve as a protective environment which favours e.g. significant lipid preservation.

Predominantly, chemical alterations occur prior to the burial of a vessel via a wide range of processes such as cleavage, hydrolysis, oxidation, thermal decomposition and ketonic decarboxylation. These are also impacted by vessel use, ceramic fabric, soil chemistry and climatic conditions. Moreover, experimental work has shown that these processes can occur quickly. After burial, the local geology and climate, including soil aeration, water movement and content, soil pH and burial temperature are predominantly responsible for the degree of microbial activity and, the resulting lipid preservation. Slightly acidic soils as well as a dry and stable climate have the best effect on organic compound preservation. If a soil is too acidic, the lipids undergo acid-catalysed ester hydrolysis reactions, whereas too alkaline soils result in a saponification of the lipids. Moreover, within neutral soils lipids will be affected by bacterial and fungal activity.

=== Formation processes ===
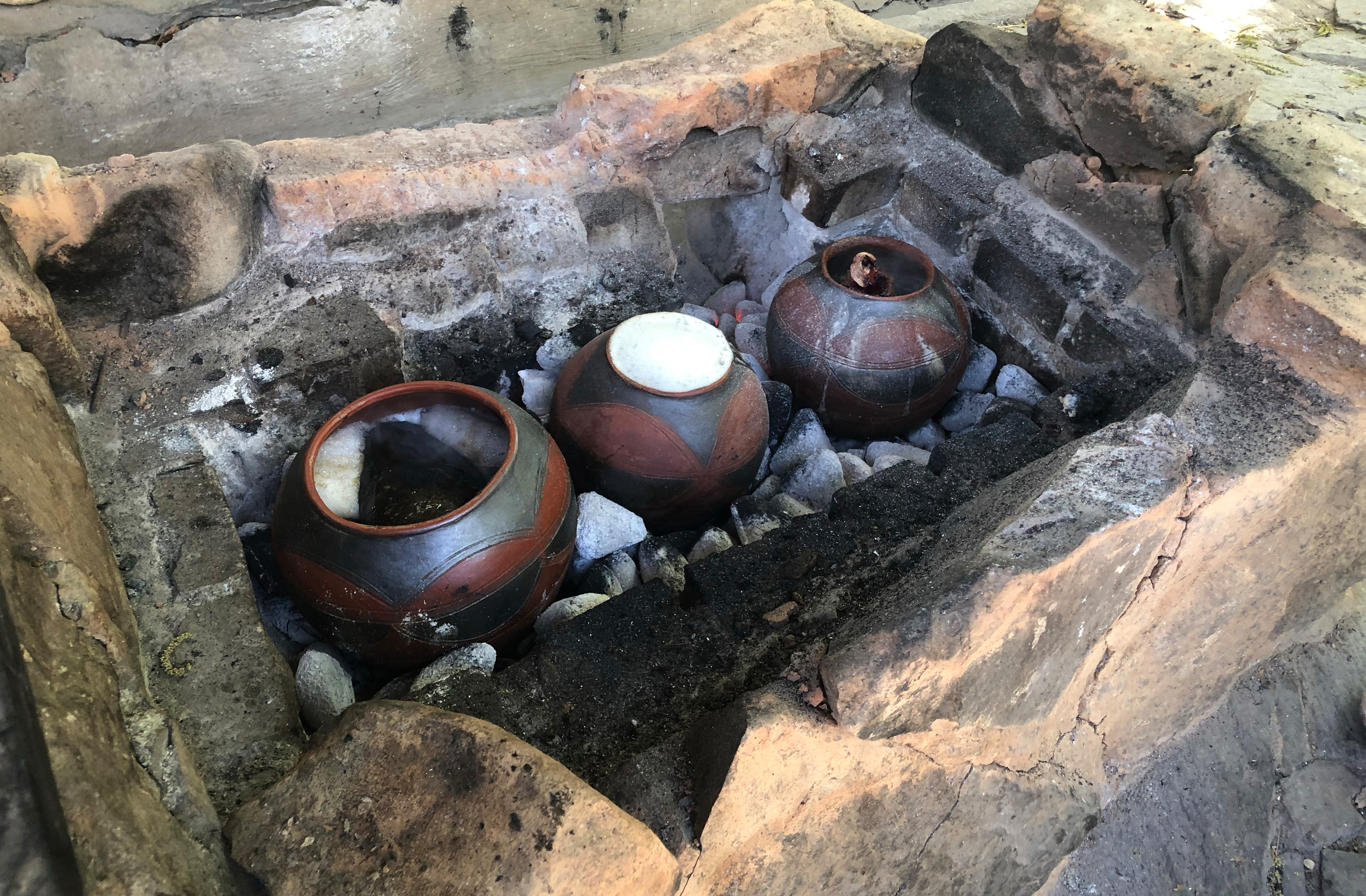
Cooking animal fats in experimental cooking pots for references.

Up until now, little is known about the mechanisms that lead to the formation and preservation of residues, as well as how residues accumulate in ceramics. Furthermore, the effect of different ceramic fabrics on residue formation and preservation remains understudied. As demonstrated in previous studies, some metal ions present in the ceramic fabrics can influence the formation of ketones. A new study by Drieu et al. indicates, however, that ketones also form during the sealing of a vessel If a pot contains long-chain ketones, uniform darkening of the surface and the edges in the absence of food crusts, it must be considered that thermally altered markers could relate to production and maintenance related post-firing treatments, rather than cooking.

In the literature it is further discussed if the size of voids in ceramics could affect preservation conditions and it could be demonstrated that the overall porosity in combination with a high level of small pores favours the preservation of lipids. Hence, depending on pore size, microorganisms can access the ceramic fabric to a greater or lesser extent, favouring or hindering degradation processes.

New insights on the formation of residues could be obtained from a year-long cooking experiment. It was investigated whether recovered organic residues represent only the final foodstuff prepared or if they represent the accumulation of various cooking events within the same vessel. The results are quite significant and present an important start to address this research question. Miller et al. were able to demonstrate that various sampling areas represent specific cooking events within the vessel; (i) charred macro-remains represent the final foodstuffs, (ii) thinlayer patina residues represent a mixture of previous cooking events with a bias towards the final product(s), (iii) absorbed lipid residues relate to a number of cooking events, replaced slowly over time, with little evidence of the ingredients of the final recipe. The experiment was conducted under artificial conditions.

Further cooking experiments revealed the physical behaviour of lipids during the boiling of plant and animal tissue. Different areas of the vessel yielded distinct lipid concentrations as lipids were mobilised and absorbed into the ceramic matrix primarily within the shoulder region of a vessel.

== Limitations ==
When applying lipid residue analysis to archaeological and ethnographic material, one must always keep in mind that interpretations are limited, and certain food resources can still be 'hidden'. Researchers are facing the problem that only lipids, which are likely to preserve, can be detected and identified. For example, plant residues are less likely to leave traces of organic compounds, whereas trace components, such as herbs and spices are likely to be undetectable. Studies have shown that in ceramics used to process both plant and animal products, the animal products can 'swamp' and mask the plant signature. Hence, meat will appear to dominate over vegetables

In 2019, Dunne & Grillo et al. published a study combining ethnoarchaeological research and chemical and isotopic analyses of lipid residues from ceramics made and used by modern Samburu pastoralists in northern Kenya. The sherds (n=63), made by Samburu people over the last 50–100 years, were collected from recently occupied open-air and rock shelter sites. The goal of the study was to investigate whether the extracted lipid compounds represent the relative importance of different processed foods within a society, especially within daily life. Furthermore, the authors questioned if fine nuances such as specific practices, taboos in food consumption, and daily food consumption practices related to age or gender. They also questioned if differences in the use of a vessel in regard to cultural prohibitions can be detected. Interestingly, the GC-C-IRMS results indicate a strong focus on ruminant carcass processing, although the Samburu diet is not meat-based. While milk is a staple within Samburu diet as well as within other eastern African pastoralist groups, milk is mostly not cooked or stored in pots but rather in wooden containers. Nevertheless, the results reflect the significance of meat and fat for social and ceremonial activities of the Samburu culture

A similar study by Drieu and colleagues (2022) focused on diversity of organic residue absorption patterns via an ethnoarchaeological approach. The analysis and interpretation of nine ceramic vessels from Senegal were carried out as a blind test and later compared with the actual use. The results show that even if a vessel was used for cooking or boiling, lipids are likely to get absorbed into the ceramic matrix and hence enable the detection of vessel use. Furthermore, additional distribution criteria are proposed to investigate vessel function. Drieu et al. demonstrate that quantitative lipid analysis is a valuable tool to reconstruct vessel function. However, more caution needs to be taken when comparing concentrations between pots due to the observed variability between samples. Drieu et al. further address the limitations in interpreting vessel content, and hence use, of pots with a low to no lipid signal which introduces a biased understanding of vessel use

Lipid residue analysis will always face the difficulty of a biased reconstruction of past human behaviour. Although organic residue analysis will never be able to reconstruct e.g. entire meals or medicinal recipes, it is a powerful tool due to the higher chances of lipid survival in comparison to other organic compounds, such as DNA or proteins.
