= (2Z,6E)-farnesyl-diphosphate diphosphate-lyase =

(2Z,6E)-farnesyl-diphosphate diphosphate-lyase may refer to:

- (−)-gamma-cadinene synthase ((2Z,6E)-farnesyl diphosphate cyclizing), an enzyme
- Alpha-guaiene synthase, an enzyme
- 5-epi-alpha-selinene synthase, an enzyme
