= (−)-gamma-cadinene synthase ((2Z,6E)-farnesyl diphosphate cyclizing) =

Class of enzymes

(−)-γ-cadinene synthase ((2Z,6E)-farnesyl diphosphate cyclizing)

Identifiers
- EC no.: 4.2.3.62

Databases
- IntEnz: IntEnz view
- BRENDA: BRENDA entry
- ExPASy: NiceZyme view
- KEGG: KEGG entry
- MetaCyc: metabolic pathway
- PRIAM: profile
- PDB structures: RCSB PDB PDBe PDBsum
Search
- PMC: articles
- PubMed: articles
- NCBI: proteins

(−)-γ-Cadinene synthase (EC 4.2.3.62, (2Z,6E)-farnesyl diphosphate cyclizing) ((−)-γ-cadinene cyclase) is an enzyme with the systematic name (2Z,6E)-farnesyl-diphosphate diphosphate-lyase ((−)-γ-cadinene-forming). This enzyme catalyses the following chemical reaction:

(2Z,6E)-farnesyl diphosphate $\rightleftharpoons$ (−)-γ-cadinene + [diphosphate]

This enzyme is isolated from the liverwort Heteroscyphus planus.
