= 5-epi-alpha-selinene synthase =

Class of enzymes

5-epi-α-selinene synthase

Identifiers
- EC no.: 4.2.3.90

Databases
- IntEnz: IntEnz view
- BRENDA: BRENDA entry
- ExPASy: NiceZyme view
- KEGG: KEGG entry
- MetaCyc: metabolic pathway
- PRIAM: profile
- PDB structures: RCSB PDB PDBe PDBsum
Search
- PMC: articles
- PubMed: articles
- NCBI: proteins

5-epi-α-Selinene synthase (EC 4.2.3.90, 8a-epi-α-selinene synthase, NP1) is an enzyme with systematic name (2Z,6E)-farnesyl-diphosphate diphosphate-lyase (cyclizing, 5-epi-α-selinene-forming). This enzyme catalyses the following chemical reaction

(2E,6E)-farnesyl diphosphate $\rightleftharpoons$ 5-epi-α-selinene + diphosphate

This enzyme requires Mg^{2+}.
