= Ginkgotoxin =

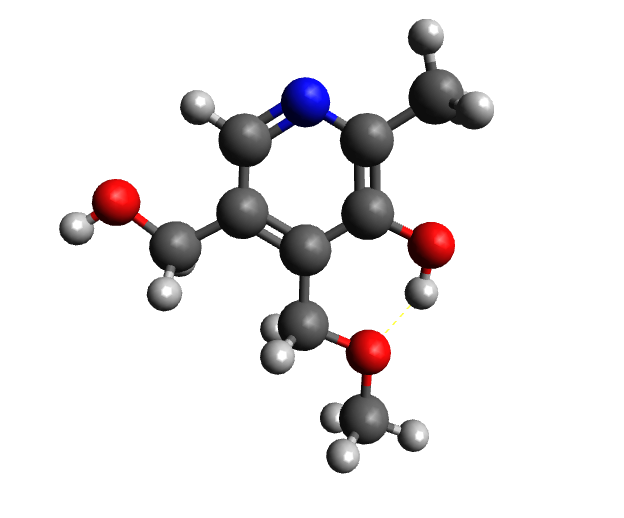

Names
- Preferred IUPAC name 5-(Hydroxymethyl)-4-(methoxymethyl)-2-methylpyridin-3-ol
- Other names 4'-O-methylpyridoxine; 4-O-methylpyridoxine

Identifiers
CAS Number	1464-33-1; 3131-27-9 (HCl)
3D model (JSmol)	Interactive image
ChEBI	CHEBI:166575
ChEMBL	ChEMBL1076875
ChemSpider	69046
PubChem CID	76581
UNII	BSN7F3YJ95
CompTox Dashboard (EPA)	DTXSID00163366
- InChI: InChI=1S/C9H13NO3/c1-6-9(12)8(5-13-2)7(4-11)3-10-6/h3,11-12H,4-5H2,1-2H3 Key: SVINQHQHARVZFF-UHFFFAOYSA-N
- SMILES: Oc1c(c(cnc1C)CO)COC

Properties
Chemical formula	C_{9}H_{13}NO_{3}
Molar mass	183.207 g·mol^{−1}

Hazards
- GHS labelling
Pictograms	(GHS06: Toxic)
Signal word	Danger
Hazard statements	H300, H330
Precautionary statements	P260, P264, P270, P271, P284, P301+P310, P304+P340, P310, P320, P321, P330, P403+P233, P405, P501
- Except where otherwise noted, data are given for materials in their standard state (at 25 °C [77 °F], 100 kPa). verify (what is ?) Infobox references

Ginkgotoxin (4'-O-methylpyridoxine) is a neurotoxin naturally occurring in Ginkgo biloba. It is an antivitamin structurally related to vitamin B_{6} (pyridoxine). It has the capacity to induce epileptic seizures.

== Occurrence ==
Seeds and phytopharmaceuticals derived from the plant Ginkgo biloba are dietary supplements used to improve memory, brain metabolism, and blood flow, and to treat neuronal disorders. It has been long used for a wide range of medicinal purposes. For instance, in Japan and China, Ginkgo biloba is used to treat cough, bronchial asthma, irritable bladder and alcohol use disorder.

Ginkgotoxin is found in the seeds and, in lesser amounts, in the leaves of Ginkgo biloba. The seeds can be consumed as is and the leaves can be used to prepare the dietary supplements. Analyses of raw seeds from eight different locations in Japan by high-performance liquid chromatography showed concentrations of ginkgotoxin varying from 0.173 to 0.4 mg/g of seeds. Also, there is a seasonal variation of ginkgotoxin concentration in the seeds. The maximum has been observed in August. Analyses of the powder of Ginkgo biloba capsules revealed the presence of ginkgotoxin. However, most oral supplements are made from the leaves, which contain only small amounts of ginkgotoxin, below the level of toxicological relevance.

Ginkgotoxin-5'-glucoside is a derivative of ginkgotoxin that possesses a glycosyl in the 5' position. Its content is higher than the concentration of ginkgotoxin in heated seeds (boiled or roasted). Liberation of ginkgotoxin by enzymatic hydrolysis of the glycosidic linkage is possible. Nevertheless, the toxicity or the mechanism of action of the glucoside form is not fully understood.

Ginkgotoxin can also be found in plants of the genus Albizia. However, these plants have no known dietary use for humans, so their production of ginkgotoxin is of lesser concern.

== Biosynthesis ==
Ginkgotoxin is the 4'-O-methyl derivative of vitamin B_{6} (pyridoxine), but the presence of the vitamin is not required for the biosynthesis of ginkgotoxin. It indicates that the pyridoxine system can be synthesized de novo in the cells of Ginkgo biloba.

Biosynthesis of ginkgotoxin

The first step of the biosynthesis involves ribulose 5-phosphate and dihydroxyacetone phosphate. They react in the presence of a synthase complex consisting of Pdx1 and Pdx2, and form pyridoxal phosphate. The second step is hypothetical and consists of the removal of a hydride in the presence of a dehydrogenase to produce pyridoxine. The last step involves the O-methylation of pyridoxine to form 4'-O-methylpyridoxine (ginkgotoxin).

== Toxicity ==
A few cases reported poisoning from commercially available products. The consumption of seeds represent a greater concern. Overconsumption of Ginkgo biloba seeds, especially by children, can result in loss of consciousness, convulsions, and death.

Ginkgotoxin is structurally related to vitamin B_{6}. It is suspected that ginkgotoxin interferes with the synthesis of the vitamin by decreasing the activity of pyridoxal kinase in mammals. This decrease leads to the decreased availability of glutamate decarboxylase. In turn, it causes an imbalance between excitation and inhibition of neurotransmitters, resulting in epileptic seizures. The toxicity of ginkgotoxin consequently can be relieved by taking vitamin B_{6} supplements.
