= Pyridoxine 5'-phosphate synthase =

Class of enzymes

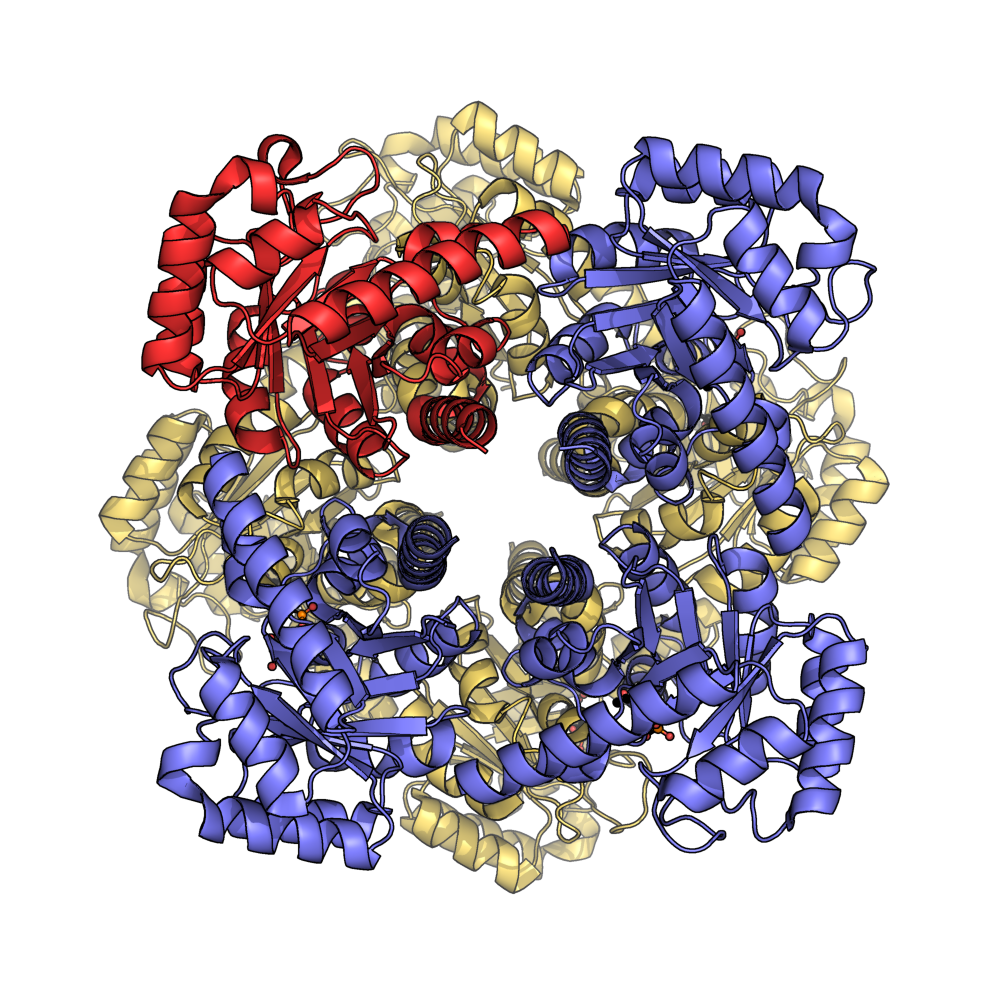
- Escherichia coli pyridoxine 5'-phosphate synthase PDB: 1M5W

Identifiers
- EC no.: 2.6.99.2

Databases
- IntEnz: IntEnz view
- BRENDA: BRENDA entry
- ExPASy: NiceZyme view
- KEGG: KEGG entry
- MetaCyc: metabolic pathway
- PRIAM: profile
- PDB structures: RCSB PDB PDBe PDBsum
Search
- PMC: articles
- PubMed: articles
- NCBI: proteins

In enzymology, a pyridoxine 5'-phosphate synthase (EC 2.6.99.2) is an enzyme that catalyzes the chemical reaction

1-deoxy-D-xylulose 5-phosphate + 3-hydroxy-1-aminoacetone phosphate $\rightleftharpoons$ pyridoxine-5'-phosphate + phosphate + 2 H_{2}O

The two substrates of this enzyme are 1-deoxy-D-xylulose 5-phosphate (DXP) and 3-hydroxy-1-aminoacetone phosphate (HAP), whereas its 3 products are H_{2}O, phosphate, and pyridoxine-5'-phosphate (a vitamer of pyridoxal phosphate).

== Mechanism ==
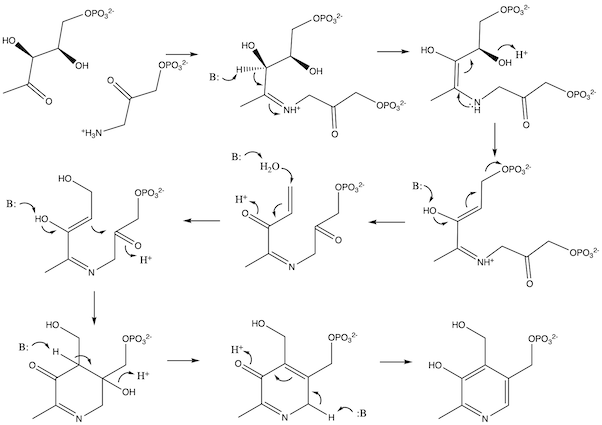
Arrow-pushing mechanism of the reaction catalyzed by pdxJ. Other mechanisms have been proposed but differ only in the timing of phosphate removal.

In the first step of this condensation reaction, the amine group of HAP forms a Schiff base with the ketone group of DXP. The hydroxyl group on C4 of DXP is eliminated, forming an enol. The enol eliminates the phosphate derived from DXP, and water is added to the resulting double bond to reform the enol. This enol then attacks the HAP ketone group to close the ring and the resulting hydroxyl group is eliminated to form a double bond. A deprotonation causes the ring to aromatize, completing the synthesis of pyridoxine-5'-phosphate.

3-hydroxy-1-aminoacetone phosphate is unstable, so the reaction mechanism cannot be confirmed directly. Nonetheless, ^{14}C and ^{18}O isotopic labeling experiments, as well as structural studies, support the mechanism shown here. A glutamate residue, Glu72, is positioned ideally to perform most of the acid-base catalysis required in this mechanism, with histidine residues His45 and His193 appearing to play roles as well.

== Structure ==
Pyridoxine-5'-phosphate synthase, or pdxJ, is a TIM barrel protein, although it exhibits some departures from this motif. Most significantly, the central tunnel of pdxJ is hydrophilic in contrast to the hydrophobic central tunnel observed in most TIM barrel proteins, and pdxJ has three extra alpha helices compared to the classical TIM fold. These three extra helices are important for mediating inter-subunit contacts in the assembled octamer. However, there are also important similarities in function: like many TIM barrel proteins, pdxJ binds its substrates primarily by their phosphate moieties, and the phosphate-binding site responsible for binding to HAP and pyridoxine 5'-phosphate is a conserved motif found in many TIM barrel proteins. The fact that pdxJ binds substrates through their phosphate groups explains a previously discovered specificity for the substrates over their respective non-phosphorylated alcohols.

pdxJ exhibits several different conformations, depending on the substrates or substrate analogs bound. The first state, exhibited when pdxJ has either pyridoxine-5'-phosphate or no substrates bound, is classified as the "open" conformation. This conformation is characterized by an active site freely accessible by solvent. In contrast, when DXP and an HAP analog are bound, loop 4 of the protein folds over the active site, preventing the escape of reaction intermediates or undesirable side reactions. Binding of phosphate alone is not capable of causing a transition between the open and closed states. A third, "partially open" intermediate has also been reported upon binding of DXP alone.

pdxJ assembles as an octamer under biological conditions. This octamer can be thought of as a tetramer of dimers, and it is likely that the dimer is the active unit of the protein. In each dimer, an arginine residue Arg20 forms part of the active site in the other monomer, where it helps bind both phosphate groups.

== Classification ==
This enzyme belongs to the family of transferases, specifically those transferring nitrogenous groups transferring other nitrogenous groups.

== Nomenclature ==
The systematic name of this enzyme class is 1-deoxy-D-xylulose-5-phosphate:3-amino-2-oxopropyl phosphate 3-amino-2-oxopropyltransferase (phosphate-hydrolysing; cyclizing). Other names in common use include pyridoxine 5-phosphate phospho lyase, PNP synthase, and PdxJ.

== Biological role ==
This enzyme participates in vitamin B_{6} metabolism. pdxJ plays a role in the DXP-dependent pathway of pyridoxal phosphate. The DXP-dependent pathway is found predominantly in Gammaproteobacteria and some Alphaproteobacteria. Because of this distribution, pdxJ has been identified as a potential drug target for antibiotics. This identification seems to have validity, as other approaches have also identified pdxJ as a good target for drug development. However, there may be limits to this approach as pdxJ is not found in obligate parasites. pdxJ and more generally vitamin B_{6} metabolism in the microbiome have also been shown to alter the effects of certain compounds on animal hosts.
