= Quinolidomicin =

Quinolidomicin A1
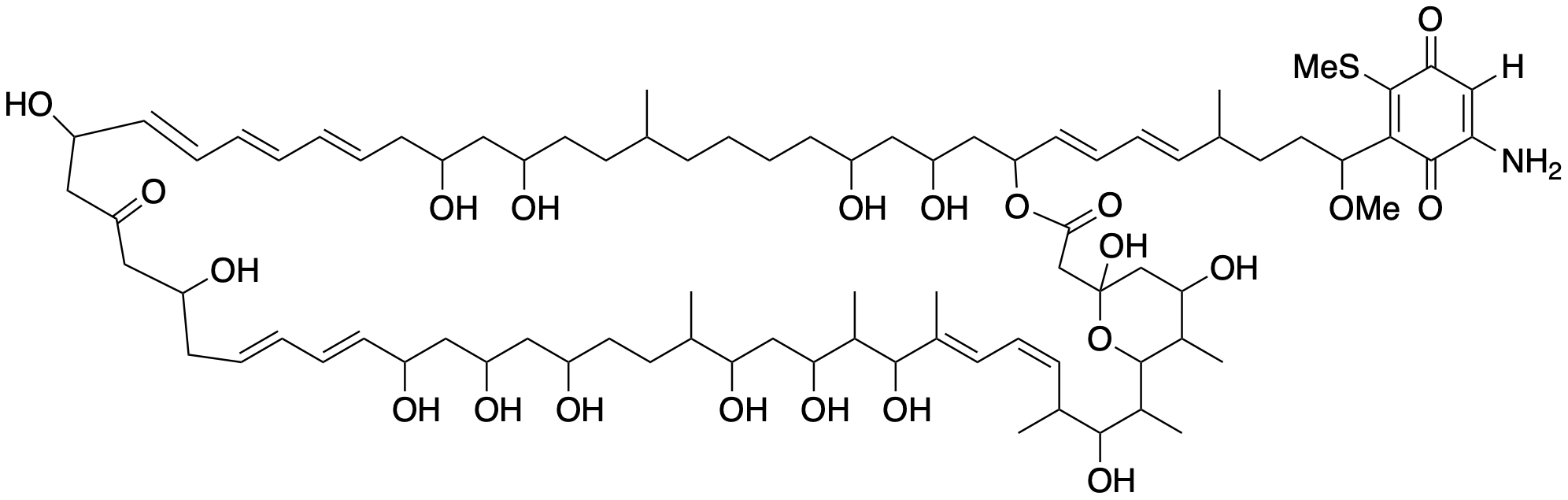

Names
- IUPAC name (21Z,23Z,25Z,33Z,35Z,50Z,52Z)-1,7,9,17,19,27,31,37,39,41,45,47,49,55,59-pentadecahydroxy-5-[(1E,3E)-8-(5-hydroxy-2-methylsulfanyl-3,6-dioxocyclohexa-1,4-dien-1-yl)-8-methoxy-5-methylocta-1,3-dienyl]-14,44,48,50,54,56,58-heptamethyl-4,61-dioxabicyclo[55.3.1]henhexaconta-21,23,25,33,35,50,52-heptaene-3,29-dione

Identifiers
CAS Number	148504-47-6
3D model (JSmol)	Interactive image; Interactive image
ChemSpider	10291294
MeSH	A1 quinolidomicin A1
PubChem CID	101656815
- InChI: InChI=1S/C83H132O23S/c1-51-24-19-21-32-63(88)44-68(93)46-69(33-22-20-25-52(2)35-39-75(104-9)77-80(102)72(96)48-73(97)82(77)107-10)105-76(99)50-83(103)49-74(98)57(7)81(106-83)58(8)79(101)55(5)27-23-26-54(4)78(100)56(6)71(95)47-70(94)53(3)36-38-65(90)45-67(92)43-62(87)31-18-14-17-30-61(86)42-66(91)41-60(85)29-16-13-11-12-15-28-59(84)40-64(89)37-34-51/h11-18,20,22-23,25-27,29,31,33,48,51-53,55-65,67-71,74-75,78-79,81,84-90,92-96,98,100-101,103H,19,21,24,28,30,32,34-47,49-50H2,1-10H3/b13-11-,15-12-,17-14-,25-20+,27-23-,29-16-,31-18-,33-22+,54-26- Key: ICRSVVBHIOAZHM-VRIDVCIJSA-N
- SMILES: CC1CCCCC(CC(CC(OC(=O)CC2(CC(C(C(O2)C(C(C(C=CC=C(C(C(C(CC(C(CCC(CC(CC(C=CC=CCC(CC(=O)CC(C=CC=CC=CCC(CC(CC1)O)O)O)O)O)O)O)C)O)O)C)O)C)C)O)C)C)O)O)C=CC=CC(C)CCC(C3=C(C(=O)C=C(C3=O)O)SC)OC)O)O; CC1CCCCC(CC(CC(OC(=O)CC2(CC(C(C(O2)C(C(C(/C=C\C=C(/C(C(C(CC(C(CCC(CC(CC(/C=C\C=C/CC(CC(=O)CC(/C=C\C=C/C=C\CC(CC(CC1)O)O)O)O)O)O)O)C)O)O)C)O)\C)C)O)C)C)O)O)/C=C/C=C/C(C)CCC(C3=C(C(=O)C=C(C3=O)O)SC)OC)O)O

Properties
Chemical formula	C_{83}H_{133}NO_{22}S
Molar mass	1529.02 g·mol^{−1}
Density	1.3±0.1 g/cm^{3}
Boiling point	1,444.6 °C (2,632.3 °F; 1,717.8 K) ±65.0
Vapor pressure	0.0±0.6 mmHg
Refractive index (n_{D})	1.597

Hazards
Flash point	827.5±34.3 °C
- Except where otherwise noted, data are given for materials in their standard state (at 25 °C [77 °F], 100 kPa). Infobox references

Quinolidomicin A_{1} is a 60-membered macrocyclic compound isolated from Micromonospora sp. JY16. Quinolidomicins are a class of macrolides that contain a benzoquinone chromophore as well as an immense lactone ring, which far surpasses that in monozanomycin. It is currently the largest identified macrolide of terrestrial origin. It was initially discovered when in a screening for anti-tumor antibiotics, where it was found to be cytotoxic against P388 murine leukemia cells (IC50 8 nM), and has later been found to have strong cytotoxic activity against HT-29, MKN28, K562, and KB.

== Biosynthesis ==
Like many macrocyclic polyketides, quinolidomicin A_{1} is biosynthesized by type-I polyketide synthases. Decarboxylative condensations for a single-chain elongation are facilitated by β-ketosynthase (KS), acyl transferase (AT), and acyl carrier protein (ACP). The modification domains that contribute to structural variations are dehydratase (DH), enoylreductase (ER), and β-ketoreductase (KR). A module refers to a set of these domains. The acyclic chain is then cut by thioesterase (TE). As this is such a large macrolide, it contains many modules across 13 open reading frames (ORF) to be biosynthesized, the order shown as a sequence of these domains.

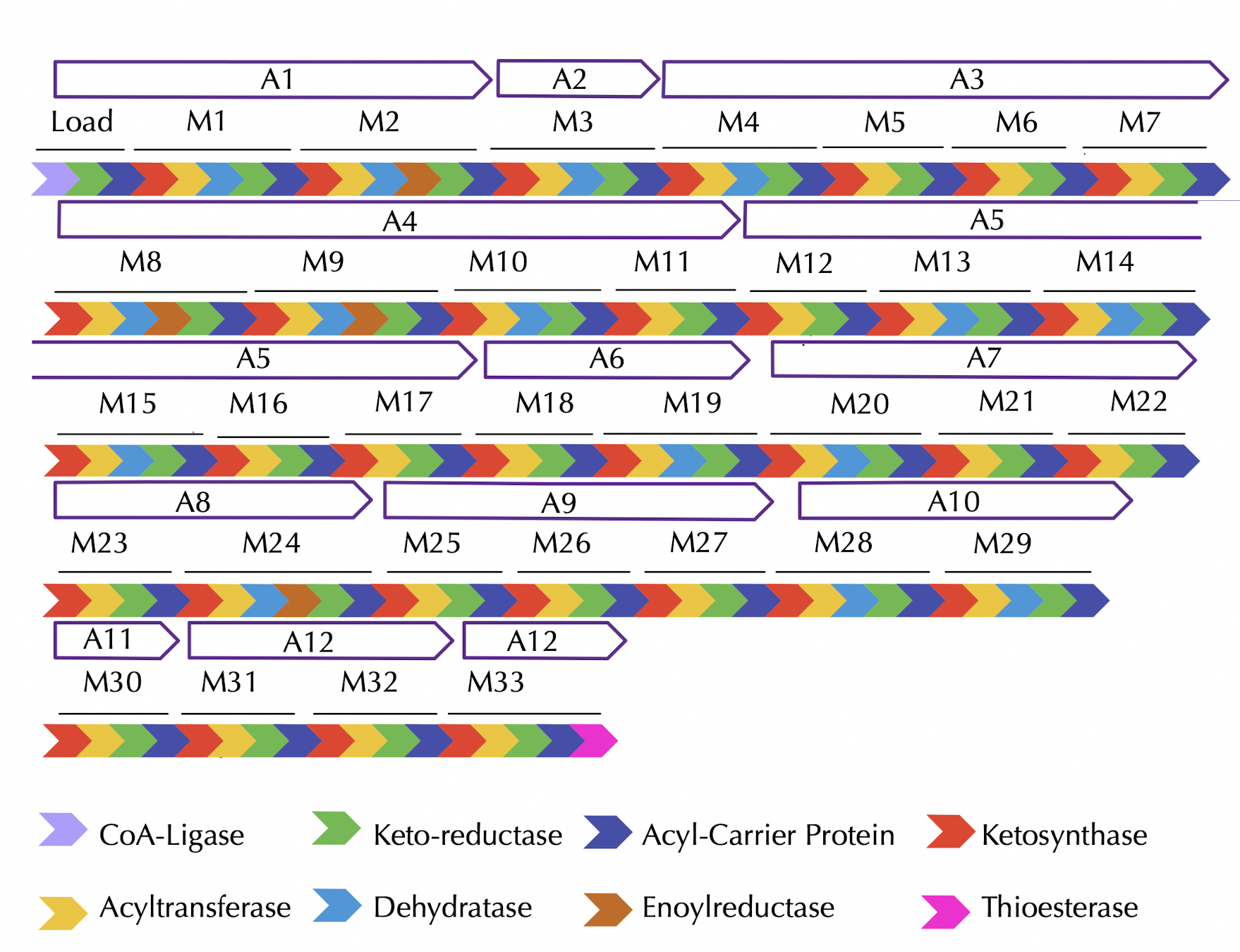
Type-I polyketide synthase for the biosynthesis of Quinolidomicin A1
