= Pyridoxal kinase =

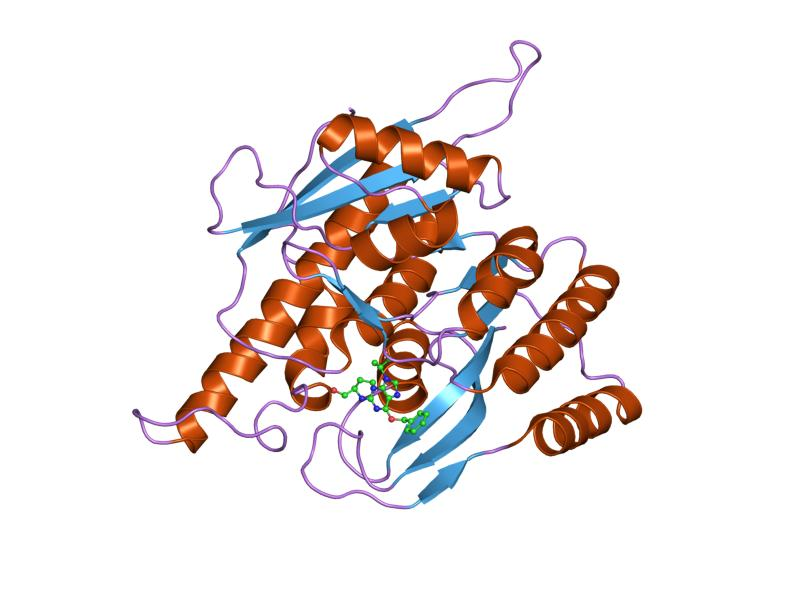

Identifiers
- EC no.: 2.7.1.35
- CAS no.: 9026-42-0

Databases
- IntEnz: IntEnz view
- BRENDA: BRENDA entry
- ExPASy: NiceZyme view
- KEGG: KEGG entry
- MetaCyc: metabolic pathway
- PRIAM: profile
- PDB structures: RCSB PDB PDBe PDBsum
- Gene Ontology: AmiGO / QuickGO
Search
- PMC: articles
- PubMed: articles
- NCBI: proteins

Pyridoxal kinase (EC 2.7.1.35) is an enzyme that catalyzes the chemical reaction

ATP +
pyridoxal
ADP +
pyridoxal phosphate

The enzyme characterised from liver converts pyridoxal to the active form of vitamin B_{6}, pyridoxal phosphate (pyridoxal 5' phosphate), by transferring a phosphate group from the cofactor, adenosine triphosphate (ATP), which is converted to adenosine diphosphate (ADP). A number of other phosphate acceptors can be used in place of pyridoxal to produce the corresponding 5' phosphate, including pyridoxine, pyridoxamine and various derivatives. The 5'-phosphates of pyridoxine and pyridoxamine can be converted to pyridoxal 5'-phosphate by pyridoxine 5′-phosphate oxidase.

This enzyme is a transferase, specifically one transferring phosphorus-containing groups (phosphotransferases) with an alcohol group as acceptor. The systematic name of this enzyme class is ATP:pyridoxal 5'-phosphotransferase. Other names in common use include pyridoxal kinase (phosphorylating), pyridoxal 5-phosphate-kinase, pyridoxal phosphokinase, and pyridoxine kinase. This enzyme participates in vitamin B_{6} metabolism.

Humans have one version of this enzyme encoded by the gene PDXK.

== Structural studies ==
As of late 2007, 15 structures have been solved for this class of enzymes, with PDB accession codes PDB: 1LHP, PDB: 1LHR, PDB: 1RFT, PDB: 1RFU, PDB: 1RFV, PDB: 1TD2, PDB: 1VI9, PDB: 1YGJ, PDB: 1YGK, PDB: 1YHJ, PDB: 2AJP, PDB: 2DDM, PDB: 2DDO, PDB: 2DDW, and PDB: 2F7K.
