= Carbamoyl-serine ammonia-lyase =

Enzyme

carbamoyl-serine ammonia-lyase

Identifiers
- EC no.: 4.3.1.13
- CAS no.: 52227-64-2

Databases
- IntEnz: IntEnz view
- BRENDA: BRENDA entry
- ExPASy: NiceZyme view
- KEGG: KEGG entry
- MetaCyc: metabolic pathway
- PRIAM: profile
- PDB structures: RCSB PDB PDBe PDBsum
- Gene Ontology: AmiGO / QuickGO
Search
- PMC: articles
- PubMed: articles
- NCBI: proteins

The enzyme carbamoyl-serine ammonia-lyase (EC 4.3.1.13) catalyzes the chemical reaction

O-carbamoyl-L-serine + H_{2}O = pyruvate + 2 NH_{3} + CO_{2} (overall reaction)

(1a) O-carbamoyl-L-serine = CO_{2} + NH_{3} + 2-aminoprop-2-enoate
(1b) 2-aminoprop-2-enoate = 2-iminopropanoate (spontaneous)
(1c) 2-iminopropanoate + H_{2}O = pyruvate + NH_{3} (spontaneous)

This enzyme belongs to the family of lyases, specifically ammonia lyases, which cleave carbon-nitrogen bonds. The systematic name of this enzyme class is O-carbamoyl-L-serine ammonia-lyase (decarboxylating; pyruvate-forming). Other names in common use include O-carbamoyl-L-serine deaminase, carbamoylserine deaminase, and O-carbamoyl-L-serine ammonia-lyase (pyruvate-forming). It employs one cofactor, pyridoxal phosphate.
