= Erythro-3-hydroxyaspartate ammonia-lyase =

erythro-3-hydroxyaspartate ammonia-lyase

Identifiers
- EC no.: 4.3.1.20

Databases
- IntEnz: IntEnz view
- BRENDA: BRENDA entry
- ExPASy: NiceZyme view
- KEGG: KEGG entry
- MetaCyc: metabolic pathway
- PRIAM: profile
- PDB structures: RCSB PDB PDBe PDBsum
- Gene Ontology: AmiGO / QuickGO
Search
- PMC: articles
- PubMed: articles
- NCBI: proteins

The enzyme erythro-3-hydroxyaspartate ammonia-lyase (EC 4.3.1.20) catalyzes the chemical reaction

erythro-3-hydroxy-L-aspartate $\rightleftharpoons$ oxaloacetate + NH_{3}

This enzyme belongs to the family of lyases, specifically ammonia lyases, which cleave carbon-nitrogen bonds. The systematic name of this enzyme class is erythro-3-hydroxy-L-aspartate ammonia-lyase (oxaloacetate-forming). Other names in common use include erythro-β-hydroxyaspartate dehydratase, erythro-3-hydroxyaspartate dehydratase, erythro-3-hydroxy-L_{s}-aspartate hydro-lyase (deaminating); erythro-3-hydroxy-L_{s}-aspartate ammonia-lyase. It employs one cofactor, pyridoxal phosphate.
