= Diaminopropionate ammonia-lyase =

diaminopropionate ammonia-lyase

Identifiers
- EC no.: 4.3.1.15
- CAS no.: 51901-19-0

Databases
- IntEnz: IntEnz view
- BRENDA: BRENDA entry
- ExPASy: NiceZyme view
- KEGG: KEGG entry
- MetaCyc: metabolic pathway
- PRIAM: profile
- PDB structures: RCSB PDB PDBe PDBsum
- Gene Ontology: AmiGO / QuickGO
Search
- PMC: articles
- PubMed: articles
- NCBI: proteins

The enzyme diaminopropionate ammonia-lyase (EC 4.3.1.15) catalyzes the chemical reaction

2,3-diaminopropanoate + H_{2}O $\rightleftharpoons$ pyruvate + 2 NH_{3}

This enzyme belongs to the family of lyases, specifically ammonia lyases, which cleave carbon-nitrogen bonds. The systematic name of this enzyme class is 2,3-diaminopropanoate ammonia-lyase (adding water; pyruvate-forming). Other names in common use include diaminopropionatase, α,β-diaminopropionate ammonia-lyase, 2,3-diaminopropionate ammonia-lyase, and 2,3-diaminopropanoate ammonia-lyase. It employs one cofactor, pyridoxal phosphate.
