= S-carboxymethylcysteine synthase =

Identifiers
- EC no.: 4.5.1.5
- CAS no.: 124671-39-2

Databases
- IntEnz: IntEnz view
- BRENDA: BRENDA entry
- ExPASy: NiceZyme view
- KEGG: KEGG entry
- MetaCyc: metabolic pathway
- PRIAM: profile
- PDB structures: RCSB PDB PDBe PDBsum
- Gene Ontology: AmiGO / QuickGO
Search
- PMC: articles
- PubMed: articles
- NCBI: proteins

The enzyme S-carboxymethylcysteine synthase (EC 4.5.1.5) catalyzes the reaction

3-chloro-L-alanine + thioglycolate $\rightleftharpoons$ S-carboxymethyl-L-cysteine + chloride

This enzyme belongs to the family of lyases, specifically the class of carbon-halide lyases. The systematic name of this enzyme class is 3-chloro-L-alanine chloride-lyase (adding thioglycolate; S-carboxymethyl-L-cysteine-forming). This enzyme is also called S-carboxymethyl-L-cysteine synthase. It employs one cofactor, pyridoxal phosphate.
