= Pyridoxamine—pyruvate transaminase =

Pyridoxamine-pyruvate transaminase

Identifiers
- EC no.: 2.6.1.30
- CAS no.: 9023-38-5

Databases
- IntEnz: IntEnz view
- BRENDA: BRENDA entry
- ExPASy: NiceZyme view
- KEGG: KEGG entry
- MetaCyc: metabolic pathway
- PRIAM: profile
- PDB structures: RCSB PDB PDBe PDBsum
- Gene Ontology: AmiGO / QuickGO
Search
- PMC: articles
- PubMed: articles
- NCBI: proteins

Pyridoxamine-pyruvate transaminase (EC 2.6.1.30) is an enzyme originally characterised from Pseudomonas that catalyzes a reversible chemical reaction that interconverts pyridoxamine and pyruvic acid with pyridoxal and L-alanine.

pyridoxamine
+
pyruvic acid
pyridoxal
+
alanine

This enzyme is a transferase, specifically a transaminase, which transfer nitrogenous groups. The systematic name of this enzyme class is pyridoxamine:pyruvate aminotransferase. This enzyme is also called pyridoxamine-pyruvic transaminase. It participates in vitamin B_{6} metabolism.
