= 2,2-dialkylglycine decarboxylase (pyruvate) =

Class of enzymes

Identifiers
- EC no.: 4.1.1.64
- CAS no.: 9032-17-1

Databases
- IntEnz: IntEnz view
- BRENDA: BRENDA entry
- ExPASy: NiceZyme view
- KEGG: KEGG entry
- MetaCyc: metabolic pathway
- PRIAM: profile
- PDB structures: RCSB PDB PDBe PDBsum
- Gene Ontology: AmiGO / QuickGO
Search
- PMC: articles
- PubMed: articles
- NCBI: proteins

The enzyme 2,2-dialkylglycine decarboxylase (pyruvate) (EC 4.1.1.64) catalyzes the chemical reaction

2,2-dialkylglycine + pyruvate $\rightleftharpoons$ dialkyl ketone + CO_{2} + L-alanine

This enzyme belongs to the family of lyases, specifically the carboxy-lyases, which cleave carbon-carbon bonds. The systematic name of this enzyme class is 2,2-dialkylglycine carboxy-lyase (amino-transferring L-alanine-forming). Other names in common use include dialkyl amino acid (pyruvate) decarboxylase, alpha-dialkyl amino acid transaminase, 2,2-dialkyl-2-amino acid-pyruvate aminotransferase, L-alanine-alpha-ketobutyrate aminotransferase, dialkylamino-acid decarboxylase (pyruvate), and 2,2-dialkylglycine carboxy-lyase (amino-transferring). It employs one cofactor, pyridoxal phosphate.

== Structural studies ==
As of late 2007, 16 structures have been solved for this class of enzymes, with PDB accession codes 1D7R, 1D7S, 1D7U, 1D7V, 1DGD, 1DGE, 1DKA, 1M0N, 1M0O, 1M0P, 1M0Q, 1Z3Z, 1ZC9, 1ZOB, 1ZOD, and 2DKB.
