= Pyridoxamine—oxaloacetate transaminase =

Pyridoxamine-oxaloacetate transaminase

Identifiers
- EC no.: 2.6.1.31
- CAS no.: 37277-88-6

Databases
- IntEnz: IntEnz view
- BRENDA: BRENDA entry
- ExPASy: NiceZyme view
- KEGG: KEGG entry
- MetaCyc: metabolic pathway
- PRIAM: profile
- PDB structures: RCSB PDB PDBe PDBsum
- Gene Ontology: AmiGO / QuickGO
Search
- PMC: articles
- PubMed: articles
- NCBI: proteins

Pyridoxamine-oxaloacetate transaminase (EC 2.6.1.31) is an enzyme originally characterised from rabbit liver and Escherichia coli that catalyzes a reversible chemical reaction that interconverts pyridoxamine and oxaloacetic acid with pyridoxal and L-aspartic acid. The enzyme is also found in rat kidney.

pyridoxamine
+
oxaloacetic acid
pyridoxal
+
aspartic acid

This is a transferase, specifically a transaminase, which transfer nitrogenous groups. The systematic name of this enzyme class is pyridoxamine:oxaloacetate aminotransferase. It participates in vitamin B_{6} metabolism.
