= UDP-4-amino-4-deoxy-L-arabinose aminotransferase =

Identifiers
- EC no.: 2.6.1.87

Databases
- IntEnz: IntEnz view
- BRENDA: BRENDA entry
- ExPASy: NiceZyme view
- KEGG: KEGG entry
- MetaCyc: metabolic pathway
- PRIAM: profile
- PDB structures: RCSB PDB PDBe PDBsum
Search
- PMC: articles
- PubMed: articles
- NCBI: proteins

UDP-4-amino-4-deoxy-L-arabinose aminotransferase (EC 2.6.1.87, UDP-(beta-L-threo-pentapyranosyl-4-ulose diphosphate) aminotransferase, UDP-4-amino-4-deoxy-L-arabinose---oxoglutarate aminotransferase, UDP-Ara4O aminotransferase, UDP-L-Ara4N transaminase) is an enzyme with systematic name UDP-4-amino-4-deoxy-beta-L-arabinose:2-oxoglutarate aminotransferase. This enzyme catalyses the following chemical reaction

UDP-4-amino-4-deoxy-beta-L-arabinopyranose + 2-oxoglutarate $\rightleftharpoons$ UDP-beta-L-threo-pentapyranos-4-ulose + L-glutamate

This protein is a pyridoxal 5'-phosphate enzyme.
