= Pyridoxamine-phosphate transaminase =

Identifiers
- EC no.: 2.6.1.54
- CAS no.: 9074-84-4

Databases
- IntEnz: IntEnz view
- BRENDA: BRENDA entry
- ExPASy: NiceZyme view
- KEGG: KEGG entry
- MetaCyc: metabolic pathway
- PRIAM: profile
- PDB structures: RCSB PDB PDBe PDBsum
- Gene Ontology: AmiGO / QuickGO
Search
- PMC: articles
- PubMed: articles
- NCBI: proteins

Pyridoxamine-phosphate transaminase (EC 2.6.1.54) is an enzyme that catalyzes the chemical reaction

pyridoxamine phosphate
+
α-ketoglutaric acid
pyridoxal phosphate
+
D-glutamic acid

The two substrates of this enzyme characterised from Clostridium kainantoi are pyridoxamine phosphate and α-ketoglutaric acid. Its products are pyridoxal phosphate and D-glutamic acid. This is the final step in the biosynthesis of the cofactor, pyridoxal phosphate, in this bacterium.

This enzyme belongs to the family of transferases, specifically the transaminases, which transfer nitrogenous groups. The systematic name of this enzyme class is pyridoxamine-5'-phosphate:2-oxoglutarate aminotransferase (D-glutamate-forming). Other names in common use include pyridoxamine phosphate aminotransferase, pyridoxamine 5'-phosphate-alpha-ketoglutarate transaminase, and pyridoxamine 5'-phosphate transaminase.
