= Chloroalanine =

- 3-Chloro-L-alanine

Names
- Other names: 3-Chloroalanine; 2-Amino-3-chloropropanoic acid

Identifiers
CAS Number	2731-73-9
3D model (JSmol)	Interactive image
ChEBI	CHEBI:88164
ChemSpider	77
PubChem CID	78
UNII	75RTT737SY
CompTox Dashboard (EPA)	DTXSID70927558
- InChI: InChI=1S/C3H6ClNO2/c4-1-2(5)3(6)7/h2H,1,5H2,(H,6,7) Key: ASBJGPTTYPEMLP-UHFFFAOYSA-N
- SMILES: C(C(C(=O)O)N)Cl

Properties
Chemical formula	C_{3}H_{6}ClNO_{2}
Molar mass	123.54 g·mol^{−1}
Appearance	White solid
Melting point	166–167 °C (331–333 °F; 439–440 K)

Hazards
- GHS labelling
Pictograms	(GHS07: Exclamation mark)
Signal word	Warning
Hazard statements	H315, H319, H335
Precautionary statements	P261, P264, P271, P280, P302+P352, P304+P340, P305+P351+P338, P312, P321, P332+P313, P337+P313, P362, P403+P233, P405, P501
- Except where otherwise noted, data are given for materials in their standard state (at 25 °C [77 °F], 100 kPa). Infobox references

Chloroalanine (3-chloroalanine) is an unnatural amino acid with the formula ClCH_{2}CH(NH_{2})CO_{2}H. It is a white, water-soluble solid. The compound is usually derived from chlorination of serine. The compound is used in the synthesis of other amino acids by replacement of the chloride. Protected forms of the related iodoalanine are also known.

== Chemical properties ==
The hydrolysis of 3-chloro-D-alanine is catalyzed by the enzyme 3-chloro-D-alanine dehydrochlorinase:

ClCH_{2}CH(NH_{2})CO_{2}H + H_{2}O →CH_{3}C(O)CO_{2}H + NH_{4}Cl
