= Dunathan stereoelectronic hypothesis =

Dunathan stereoelectronic hypothesis is a concept in chemistry to explain the stereospecific cleavage of bonds using pyridoxal phosphate. This occurs because stereoelectronic effects controls the actions of the enzyme.

== History ==
Before the correlation between fold type and reaction correlation of proteins were understood, Harmon C. Dunathan, a chemist at Haverford College proposed that the bond that is cleaved using pyridoxal is perpendicular to the system. Though an important concept in bioorganic chemistry, it is now known that enzyme conformations play a critical role in the final chemical reaction.

== Mode of action ==
The transition state is stabilized by the extended pi bond network (formation of anion). Furthermore hyperconjugation caused by the extended network draws electrons from the bond to be cleaved, thus weakening the chemical bond and making it labile The sigma bond that is parallel to the pi bond network will break. The bond that has the highest chance of being cleaved is one with the largest HOMO-LUMO overlap. This effect might be effected by electrostatic effects within the enzyme.

== Applications ==
This was seen in transferase and future interests lie in decarboxylation in various catalytic cycles.
