= Pyridoxal phosphatase =

Class of enzymes

Identifiers
- EC no.: 3.1.3.74

Databases
- BRENDA: enzyme data
- ExPASy: NiceZyme view
- KEGG: enzyme entry
- MetaCyc: metabolic pathway
- Rhea: reactions
- PDB structures: RCSB PDB PDBe PDBsum
Search
- PMC: articles
- PubMed: articles
- NCBI: proteins

The enzyme pyridoxal phosphatase (EC 3.1.3.74) catalyzes the reaction

pyridoxal phosphate
H_{2}O
P_{i}
pyridoxal

The enzyme characterised from human erythrocytes hydrolyses pyridoxal phosphate to pyridoxal and orthophosphate. Pyridoxal phosphate is an essential cofactor in many other enzyme-catalysed reactions and its cellular concentration is controlled by this hydrolysis. This phosphatase is also found in plants.

The enzyme also acts on pyridoxine phosphate, pyridoxamine phosphate, 4-pyridoxic acid phosphate and 4-deoxypyridoxine phosphate to remove their phosphate groups. Two human genes produce proteins that act as this kind of enzyme: PDXP and PHOSPHO2.

This enzyme is a hydrolase, specifically one acting on phosphoric monoester bonds. The systematic name is pyridoxal-5′-phosphate phosphohydrolase. Other names in common use include vitamine B_{6} (pyridoxine) phosphatase, PLP phosphatase, vitamin B_{6}-phosphate phosphatase, and PNP phosphatase.

== Structural studies ==
As of late 2007, 6 structures have been solved for this class of enzymes, with PDB accession codes PDB: 2CFR, PDB: 2CFS, PDB: 2CFT, PDB: 2OYC, PDB: 2P27, and PDB: 2P69.
