= Dehydratase =

Group of lyase enzymes

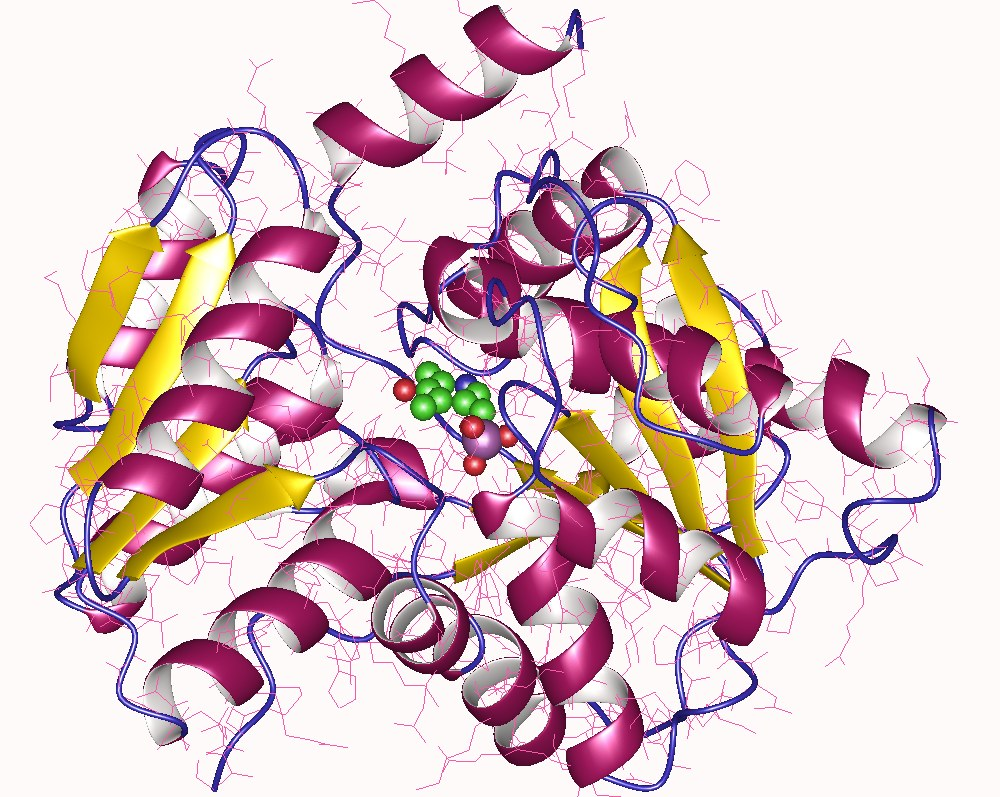
Serine dehydratase is an example of a dehydratase. It utilizes PLP as a cofactor.

Dehydratases are a group of lyase enzymes that form double and triple bonds in a substrate through the removal of water. They can be found in many places including the mitochondria, peroxisome and cytosol. There are more than 150 different dehydratase enzymes that are classified into four groups. Dehydratases can act on hydroxyacyl-CoA with or without cofactors, and some have a metal and non-metal cluster act as their active site.

== Pathology ==
A dehydratase deficiency in the body can lead to a less severe condition of hyperphenylalaninemia, which involves an over presence of phenylalanine in the blood. It is caused by a genetic recessive disorder in the autosomal DNA.

== Examples ==
Common dehydratases include:

- Delta-aminolevulinic acid dehydratase (ADA-D) is found in blood and is involved in the production of the heme group of globins. People exposed to lead will have a decrease in ADA-D activity.
- Serine dehydratase is mostly found in the liver and catalyzes the reaction of turning serine into pyruvate and ammonia. In a diet of increased protein, the activity of serine dehydratase is increased.
- Arogenate dehydratase is found mostly in the chloroplasts of higher plants. It catalyzes the reaction of turning L-arogenate into L-phenylalanine.
