= 3-chloro-D-alanine dehydrochlorinase =

Class of enzymes

Identifiers
- EC no.: 4.5.1.2
- CAS no.: 78990-65-5

Databases
- IntEnz: IntEnz view
- BRENDA: BRENDA entry
- ExPASy: NiceZyme view
- KEGG: KEGG entry
- MetaCyc: metabolic pathway
- PRIAM: profile
- PDB structures: RCSB PDB PDBe PDBsum
- Gene Ontology: AmiGO / QuickGO
Search
- PMC: articles
- PubMed: articles
- NCBI: proteins

The enzyme 3-chloro-D-alanine dehydrochlorinase (EC 4.5.1.2) catalyzes the reaction

3-chloro-D-alanine + H_{2}O = pyruvate + chloride + NH_{3} (overall reaction)

(1a) 3-chloro-D-alanine = chloride + 2-aminoprop-2-enoate
(1b) 2-aminoprop-2-enoate = 2-iminopropanoate (spontaneous)
(1c) 2-iminopropanoate + H_{2}O = pyruvate + NH_{3} (spontaneous)

This enzyme belongs to the family of lyases, specifically the class of carbon-halide lyases. The systematic name of this enzyme class is 3-chloro-D-alanine chloride-lyase (deaminating; pyruvate-forming). Other names in common use include β-chloro-D-alanine dehydrochlorinase, and 3-chloro-D-alanine chloride-lyase (deaminating). It employs one cofactor, pyridoxal phosphate.
