= Serine dehydratase =

Enzyme

SDS
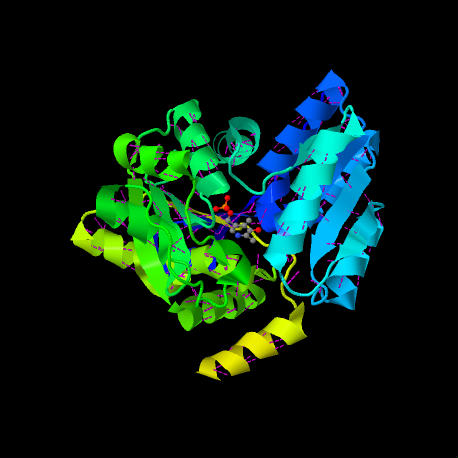
- Based on PDB: 1P5J.pdb

Identifiers
- Aliases: SDS, SDH, serine dehydratase
- External IDs: OMIM: 182128; MGI: 98270; GeneCards: SDS
Available structures
PDB	Ortholog search: PDBe RCSB
PDB	List of PDB id codes 1P5J, 4H27
Enzyme activity
EC #	BRENDA	ExPASy	KEGG	MetaCyc
4.3.1.17	↗	↗	↗	↗
4.3.1.19	↗	↗	↗	↗

Gene location (Human)
Chr.	Chromosome 12 (human)
Band	12q24.13	Start	113,392,445 bp
Band	12q24.13	End	113,426,301 bp

Gene location (Mouse)
Chr.	Chromosome 5 (mouse)
Band	5|5 F	Start	120,614,591 bp
Band	5|5 F	End	120,621,997 bp
RNA expression pattern
Bgee	Human / Mouse (ortholog); Top expressed in: right lobe of liver; putamen; caudate nucleus; secondary oocyte; nucleus accumbens; amygdala; substantia nigra; hypothalamus; right frontal lobe; left adrenal cortex / Top expressed in: left lobe of liver; embryo; extraocular muscle; embryo; blastocyst; primary visual cortex; islet of Langerhans; zygote; yolk sac; neural layer of retina; More reference expression data
BioGPS	n/a
Gene ontology
Molecular function	pyridoxal phosphate binding; protein homodimerization activity; lyase activity; L-threonine ammonia-lyase activity; L-serine ammonia-lyase activity; hydro-lyase activity
Cellular component	mitochondrion; cytoplasm; cytosol
Biological process	gluconeogenesis; cellular amino acid metabolic process; pyruvate biosynthetic process; L-serine catabolic process; L-threonine catabolic process to glycine; threonine catabolic process
Sources:Amigo / QuickGO
Orthologs
Databases	NCBI: entry; OMA: entry
Species	Human	Mouse
Entrez	10993	231691
Ensembl	ENSG00000135094	ENSMUSG00000029597
UniProt	P20132	Q8VBT2
RefSeq (mRNA)	NM_006843	NM_145565
RefSeq (protein)	NP_006834	NP_663540
Location (UCSC)	Chr 12: 113.39 – 113.43 Mb	Chr 5: 120.61 – 120.62 Mb
PubMed search
- Wikidata
View/Edit Human	View/Edit Mouse

Serine dehydratase (SDH), also called L-serine dehydratase/L-threonine deaminase, is an enzyme which in humans is encoded by the gene SDS.

SDH is able to catalyze the deamination of the amino acid L-serine along with the closely related L-threonine. This makes it both a L-serine ammonia lyase (EC 4.3.1.17) and a threonine ammonia-lyase (EC 4.3.1.19). The resulting pyruvate (or alpha-ketobutyrate in the case of threonine) can then be further metabolized into a form that can be passed into the citric acid cycle, and converted to ATP. Both types of reactions also result in the release of an ammonia molecule, coming from the removed amine group.

SDH is a pyridoxal phosphate-dependent enzyme from the beta family, and is also part of the serine/threonine dehydratase family. It is found widely in nature, but its structure and properties vary greatly among species. In humans and other mammals, SDH is particularly highly expressed in the liver (in the cytoplasm of hepatocytes). It has also been found in a number of other organisms, from african clawed frogs, to certain yeast and bacteria.

== Nomenclature ==
Serine dehydratase has been known as:

- L-Serine dehydratase
- L-serine dehydratase/L-threonine deaminase
- Hepatic serine dehydratase (hSDH)
- L-serine deaminase
- L-threonine dehydratase (TDH)

A dehydratase refers to a type of enzyme that removes a water molecule from a larger compound and leaves a double bond. This occurs in the first step of the L-serine ammonia-lyase reaction (see § Mechanism) where the side-chain hydroxyl group is removed, which is also the primary step that is catalyzed by SDH and similar enzymes. A deaminase refers to a kind of enzyme which removes an amine group, such as happens in the final step of the reaction process which is when ammonia is produced.

== Mechanism ==
The reaction catalyzed by serine dehydratase follows the pattern seen by other PLP-dependent reactions. The L-serine ammonia-lyase reaction can be interpreted as a 3 step process:

1. A Schiff base linkage is made, and a water molecule is released, leaving an aminoacrylate group
2. The product molecule spontaneously tautomerizes, shifting the double bond, and producing 2-iminobutanoate
3. The amine group of 2-iminobutanoate spontaneously hydrolyses, releasing an ammonia molecule, and leaving a carbonyl group attached to the final product, pyruvate

The threonine ammonia-lyase reaction follows an analogous 3 step process.

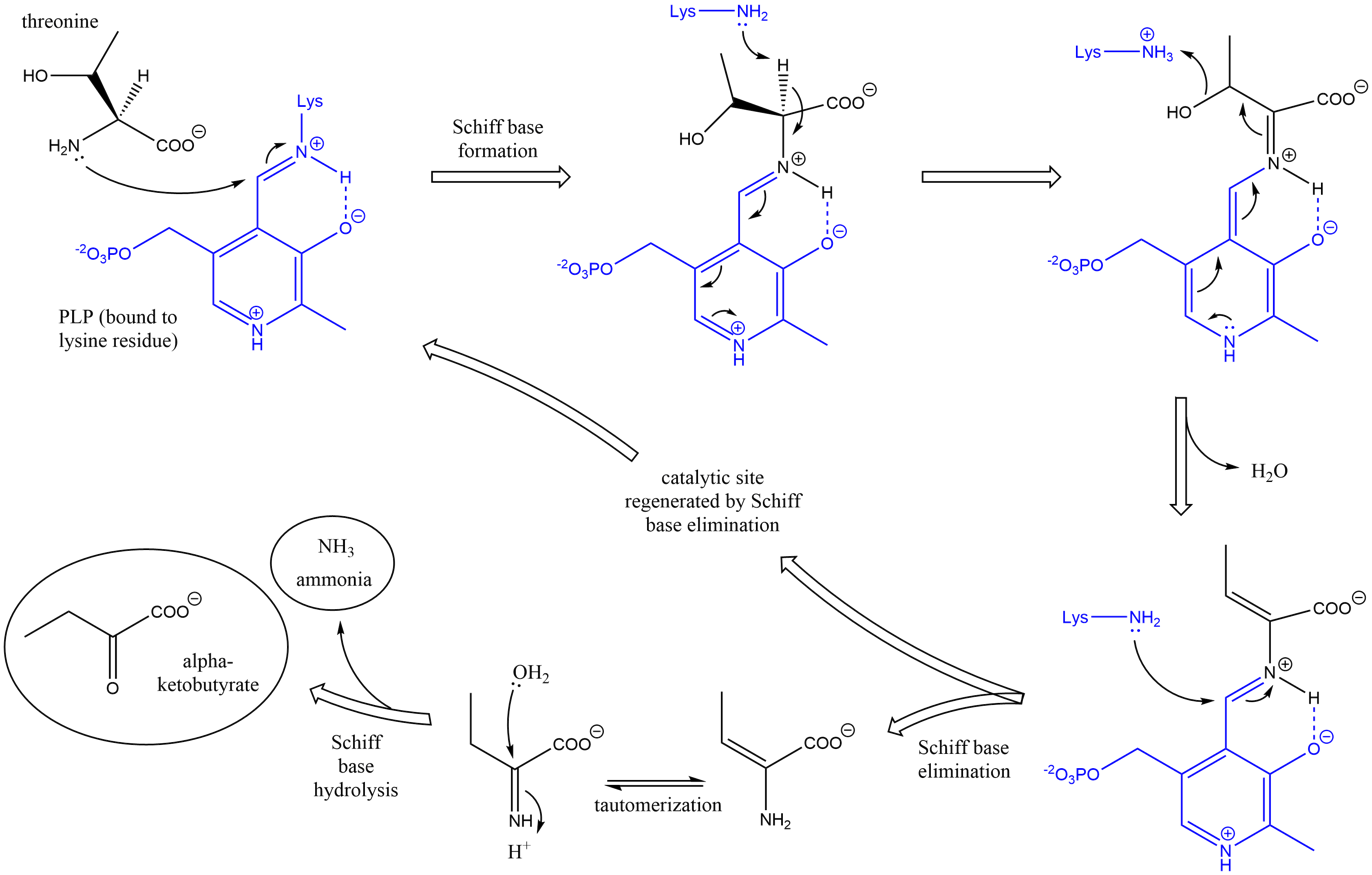
More detailed mechanism of the threonine ammonia-lyase reaction. PLP and lysine are shown in blue. The catalyzed step 1 starts from Schiff base formation, and ends at Schiff base elimination.

== Biological function ==
In general, SDH levels decrease with increasing mammalian size, and function seems to vary from species to species.

In rats, SDH enzyme plays an important role in gluconeogenesis. Activity is augmented by high-protein diets and starvation. During periods of low carbohydrates, serine is converted into pyruvate via SDH. This pyruvate enters the mitochondria where it can be converted into oxaloacetate, and, thus, glucose.

In humans, unlike rats, less is known about the function and properties because the human liver has low SDH activity. In a study done by Yoshida and Kikuchi, routes of glycine breakdown were measured. Glycine can be converted into serine and either become pyruvate via serine dehydratase or undergo oxidative cleavage into methylene-THF, ammonia, and carbon dioxide. Results showed the secondary importance of the SDH pathway.

== Disease relevance ==
SDH may be significant in the development of hyperglycemia and tumors.

Deficiency of threonine dehydratase, another beta-family PLP protein, is a possible cause of nonketotic hyperglycemia. Serine dehydratase has also been found to be absent in human colon carcinoma and rat sarcoma. The observed enzyme imbalance in these tumors shows that an increased capacity for the synthesis of serine is coupled to its utilization for nucleotide biosynthesis as a part of the commitment to cellular replication in cancer cells. This pattern is found in sarcomas and carcinomas, and in tumors of human and rodent origin.

== Inhibitors ==
According to the series of assays performed by Cleland (1967), the linear rate of pyruvate formation at various concentrations of inhibitors demonstrated that L-cysteine and D-serine competitively inhibit the enzyme SDH. The reason that SDH activity is inhibited by L-cysteine is because an inorganic sulfur is created from L-cysteine via cystine desulfrase and sulfur-containing groups are known to promote inhibition. L-threonine competitively inhibits serine dehydratase as well.

Moreover, insulin is known to accelerate glycolysis and repress induction of liver serine dehydratase in adult diabetic rats. Studies have been conducted to show insulin causes a 40-50% inhibition of the induction of serine dehydratase by glucagon in hepatocytes of rats. Studies have also shown that insulin and epinephrine inhibit serine dehydratase activity by inhibiting transcription of the SDH gene in the hepatocytes. Similarly, increasing levels of glucagon, increase the activity of SDH because this hormone up-regulates the SDH enzyme. This makes sense in the context of gluconeogenesis. The main role of SDH is to create pyruvate that can be converted into free glucose. Glucagon gives the signal to repress gluconeogenesis and increase the amount of free glucose in the blood by releasing glycogen stores from the liver.

Homocysteine, a compound that SDH combines with serine to create cystathionine, also noncompetitively inhibits the action of SDH. Studies have shown that homocysteine reacts with SDH's PLP coenzyme to create a complex. This complex is devoid of coenzyme activity and SDH is not able to function (See Enzyme Mechanism section). In general, homocysteine is an amino acid and metabolite of methionine; increased levels of homocysteine can lead to homocystinuria (see section Disease Relevance).

== Structure ==
The holoenzyme SDH contains 319 residues, one PLP cofactor molecule. The overall fold of the monomer is very similar to that of other PLP-dependent enzymes of the Beta-family. The enzyme contains a large catalytic domain that binds PLP and a small domain. The domains are linked by two residues 32–35 and 138–146, with the internal gap created being the space for the active site

=== Cofactor binding ===
The PLP cofactor is positioned in between the beta-strands 7 and 10 of the large domain and lies on the large internal gap made between small and large domain. The cofactor is covalently bonded through a Schiff base linkage to Lys41. The cofactor is sandwiched between the side chain of Phe40 and the main chain of Ala222. Each of the polar substituents of PLP is coordinated by functional groups: the pyridinium nitrogen of PLP is hydrogen-bonded to the side chain of Cys303, the C3-hydroxyl group of PLP is hydrogen-bonded to the side chain of Asn67, and the phosphate group of PLP is coordinated by main chain amides from the tetraglycine loop. (Figure 3 and Figure 4).

== Related enzymes ==
SDH is part of the serine/threonine dehydratase family, which also includes the enzymes serine dehydratase-like (encoded by SDSL) and serine racemase (encoded by SRR). Similar to SDH/SDS, Serine dehydratase-like is able to catalyze the deamination of both L-serine and L-threonine, while serine racemase is able to deaminate serine. These two other family members notably differ from SDH in their ability to catalyze racemase reactions, with serine racemase converting L-Serine to D-Serine (EC 5.1.1.18), while it has been predicted that serine dehydratase-like is able to act as a Glutamate racemase (EC 5.1.1.3) and convert between L-glutamate and D-glutamate.

== Evolution ==
Human and rat serine dehydratase cDNA are identical except for a 36 amino acid residue stretch. Similarities have also been shown between yeast and E. coli threonine dehydratase and human serine dehydratase. Human SDH shows sequence homology of 27% with the yeast enzyme and 27% with the E. coli enzyme. Overall PLP enzymes exhibit high conservation of the active site residues.
