= L-serine ammonia-lyase =

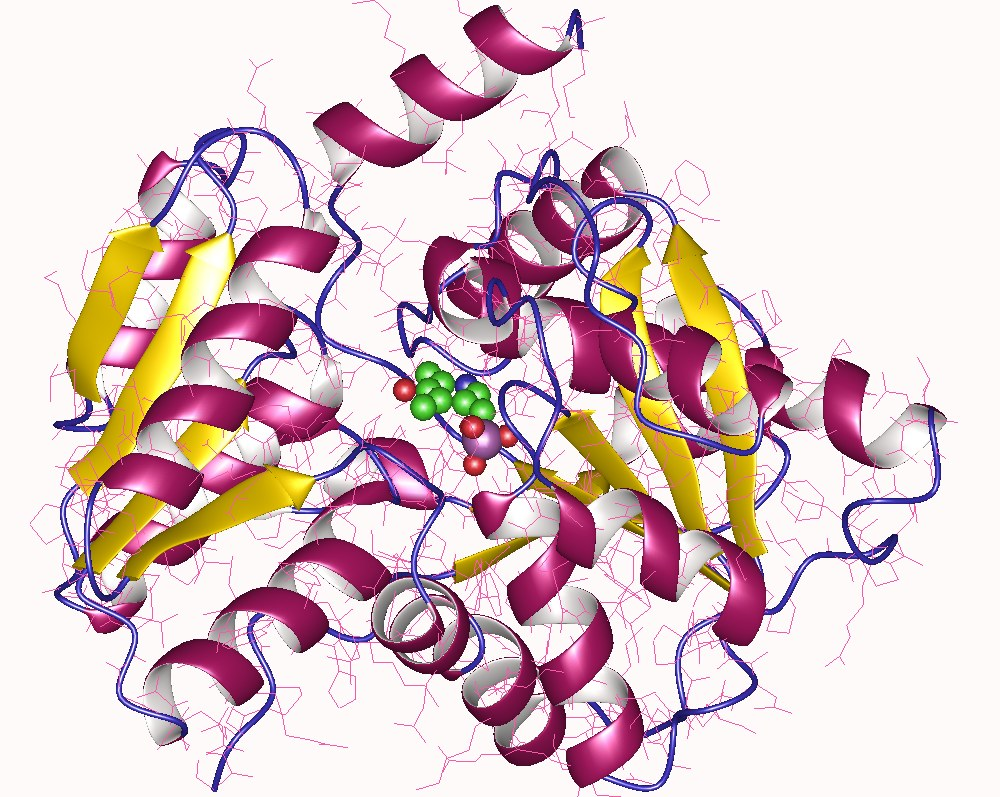
- Serine dehydratase monomer, Human

Identifiers
- EC no.: 4.3.1.17

Databases
- BRENDA: enzyme data
- ExPASy: NiceZyme view
- KEGG: enzyme entry
- MetaCyc: metabolic pathway
- Rhea: reactions
- PDB structures: RCSB PDB PDBe PDBsum
- Gene Ontology: AmiGO / QuickGO
Search
- PMC: articles
- PubMed: articles
- NCBI: proteins

The enzyme L-serine ammonia-lyase (EC 4.3.1.17) catalyzes the chemical reaction

L-serine = pyruvate + NH_{3} (overall reaction)

(1a) L-serine = 2-aminoprop-2-enoate + H_{2}O
(1b) 2-aminoprop-2-enoate = 2-iminopropanoate (spontaneous)
(1c) 2-iminopropanoate + H_{2}O = pyruvate + NH_{3} (spontaneous)

This enzyme belongs to the family of lyases, specifically ammonia lyases, which cleave carbon-nitrogen bonds. In humans, this enzymatic activity is found in the proteins encoded by the genes SDS, SDSL, and potentially SRR. The systematic name of this enzyme class is L-serine ammonia-lyase (pyruvate-forming). Other names in common use include serine deaminase, L-hydroxyaminoacid dehydratase, L-serine deaminase, L-serine dehydratase, and L-serine hydro-lyase (deaminating). This enzyme participates in glycine, serine, threonine and cysteine metabolism. It employs one cofactor, pyridoxal phosphate.

== Structural studies ==
As of late 2007, 4 structures have been solved for this class of enzymes, with PDB accession codes PDB: 1P5J, PDB: 1PWE, PDB: 1PWH, and PDB: 2IQQ.
