= Pyridoxal 5'-phosphate synthase (glutamine hydrolyzing) =

Pyridoxal 5′-phosphate synthase (glutamine hydrolyzing)

Identifiers
- EC no.: 4.3.3.6

Databases
- IntEnz: IntEnz view
- BRENDA: BRENDA entry
- ExPASy: NiceZyme view
- KEGG: KEGG entry
- MetaCyc: metabolic pathway
- PRIAM: profile
- PDB structures: RCSB PDB PDBe PDBsum
Search
- PMC: articles
- PubMed: articles
- NCBI: proteins

Pyridoxal 5′-phosphate synthase (glutamine hydrolysing) (EC 4.3.3.6, PdxST) is an enzyme with systematic name D-ribose 5-phosphate,D-glyceraldehyde 3-phosphate pyridoxal 5′-phosphate-lyase. This enzyme catalyses the following chemical reaction

D-ribose 5-phosphate + D-glyceraldehyde 3-phosphate + L-glutamine $\rightleftharpoons$ pyridoxal 5′-phosphate + L-glutamate + 3 H_{2}O + phosphate (overall reaction)

(1a) L-glutamine + H_{2}O $\rightleftharpoons$ L-glutamate + NH_{3}
(1b) D-ribose 5-phosphate + D-glyceraldehyde 3-phosphate + NH_{3} $\rightleftharpoons$ pyridoxal 5′-phosphate + 4 H_{2}O + phosphate

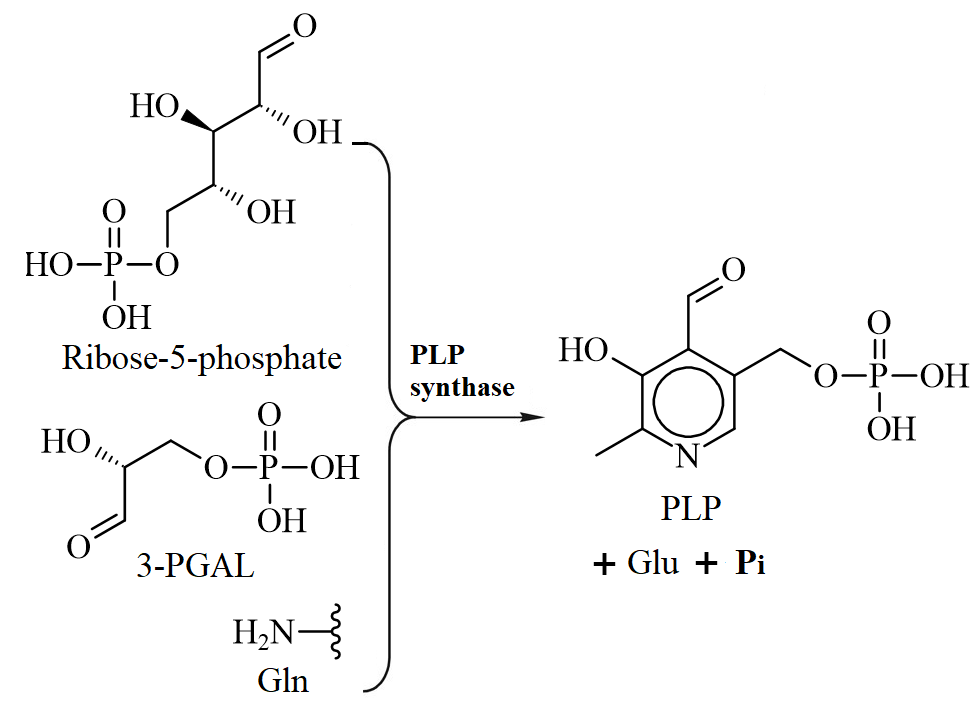
PLP biosynthesis

The enzyme can also use ribulose 5-phosphate and dihydroxyacetone phosphate.
