= Pyridoxine 5′-phosphate oxidase =

Enzyme found in humans

PNPO

Identifiers
- Aliases: PNPO, HEL-S-302, PDXPO, pyridoxamine 5'-phosphate oxidase
- External IDs: OMIM: 603287; MGI: 2144151; GeneCards: PNPO
Available structures
PDB	Ortholog search: PDBe RCSB
PDB	List of PDB id codes 1NRG, 3HY8
Enzyme activity
EC #	BRENDA	ExPASy	KEGG	MetaCyc
1.4.3.5	↗	↗	↗	↗

Gene location (Human)
Chr.	Chromosome 17 (human)
Band	17q21.32	Start	47,941,506 bp
Band	17q21.32	End	47,949,308 bp

Gene location (Mouse)
Chr.	Chromosome 11 (mouse)
Band	11|11 D	Start	96,828,651 bp
Band	11|11 D	End	96,834,812 bp
RNA expression pattern
Bgee	Human / Mouse (ortholog); Top expressed in: right lobe of liver; tibialis anterior muscle; human kidney; mucosa of ileum; islet of Langerhans; right adrenal cortex; epithelium of colon; hypothalamus; mucosa of transverse colon; muscle of thigh / Top expressed in: fetal liver hematopoietic progenitor cell; human fetus; blood; left lobe of liver; right kidney; tibiofemoral joint; ileum; medial vestibular nucleus; medial dorsal nucleus; dorsal tegmental nucleus; More reference expression data
BioGPS	More reference expression data
Gene ontology
Molecular function	oxidoreductase activity; oxidoreductase activity, acting on the CH-NH2 group of donors; protein binding; pyridoxamine-phosphate oxidase activity; FMN binding; pyridoxal phosphate binding; protein homodimerization activity
Cellular component	nucleoplasm; cytosol
Biological process	pyridoxine biosynthetic process; vitamin B6 metabolic process; pyridoxal phosphate biosynthetic process
Sources:Amigo / QuickGO
Orthologs
Databases	NCBI: entry; OMA: entry
Species	Human	Mouse
Entrez	55163	103711
Ensembl	ENSG00000108439	ENSMUSG00000018659
UniProt	Q9NVS9	Q91XF0
RefSeq (mRNA)	NM_018129	NM_134021
RefSeq (protein)	NP_060599	NP_598782
Location (UCSC)	Chr 17: 47.94 – 47.95 Mb	Chr 11: 96.83 – 96.83 Mb
PubMed search
- Wikidata
View/Edit Human	View/Edit Mouse

Pyridoxal 5′-phosphate synthase
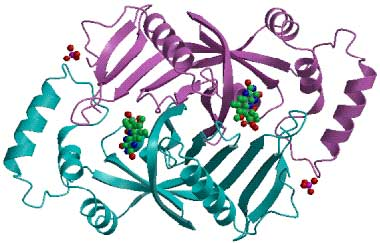

Identifiers
- EC no.: 1.4.3.5
- CAS no.: 9029-21-4

Databases
- BRENDA: enzyme data
- ExPASy: NiceZyme view
- KEGG: enzyme entry
- MetaCyc: metabolic pathway
- Rhea: reactions
- PDB structures: RCSB PDB PDBe PDBsum
- Gene Ontology: AmiGO / QuickGO
Search
- PMC: articles
- PubMed: articles
- NCBI: proteins

Pyridoxine 5′-phosphate oxidase is an enzyme that in humans is encoded by the PNPO gene. This enzyme catalyzes several reactions in the vitamin B_{6} metabolism pathway. Pyridoxine 5′-phosphate oxidase catalyzes the final, rate-limiting step in vitamin B_{6} metabolism, the biosynthesis of pyridoxal 5′-phosphate, the biologically active form of vitamin B_{6} which acts as an essential cofactor. Pyridoxine 5′-phosphate oxidase is a member of the enzyme class oxidases, or more specifically, oxidoreductases. These enzymes catalyze a simultaneous oxidation-reduction reaction. The substrate oxidase enzymes is hydroxylated by one oxygen atom of molecular oxygen. Concurrently, the other oxygen atom is reduced to water. Even though molecular oxygen is the electron acceptor in these enzymes' reactions, they are unique because oxygen does not appear in the oxidized product.

The active form of vitamin B_{6}, pyridoxal 5'-phosphate (PLP), is critical for normal cellular function. Some cancer cells have notable differences in vitamin B_{6} metabolism compared to their normal counterparts. The rate-limiting enzyme in vitamin B_{6} synthesis is pyridoxine-5'-phosphate oxidase (PNPO; EC 1.4.3.5).[supplied by OMIM]

== Structure ==
Pyridoxine 5′-phosphate oxidase is a homodimer, or a molecule consisting of two identical polypeptide subunits. It is hypothesized that the two monomers are held together by disulfide bonds. There are also salt-bridge interactions between the two monomers. Each subunit tightly binds one molecule of pyridoxal 5′-phosphate. Both alpha-helices and beta-sheets are present in the protein motif, which is best described as a split-barrel structure. This structure is due, in part, to the disulfide bonds present in the secondary protein structure of this enzyme. Multiple thiol groups (–SH) indicate the presence of disulfide bonds in the structure of the molecule. This enzyme requires the presence of a cofactor, FMN (flavin mononucleotide). Cofactors are ions or coenzymes necessary for enzyme activity. The FMN is located in a deep cleft (formed by the two polypeptide subunits), and held in place by extensive hydrogen-bond interactions with the protein. In this particular case, the FMN helps the enzyme to bind the substrates. In the absence of pyridoxal 5′-phosphate (PLP), the active site of the enzyme is in an “open” conformation. Once substrate binds and is converted to PLP, the active site of the enzyme is in a partially “closed” conformation. Specific amino acid residues can form hydrogen bonds with the PLP, thus forming a lid that physically covers the active site, giving rise to the “closed” conformation.

Pyridoxine 5′-phosphate oxidase structure. PDB: 1G78

== Pathway ==
Pyridoxine 5′-phosphate oxidase is the enzyme that catalyzes the rate-limited step of the B_{6} metabolism pathway. Vitamin B_{6}, which is also known as pyridoxine, is a crucial nutrient for the human body, as it is responsible for more bodily functions than any other vitamin. Vitamin B_{6} is a coenzyme in the metabolism of carbohydrates, fats and proteins. This means that the enzymes which break these entities down for use in the body cannot function unless Vitamin B_{6} is present to induce a conformational change in the enzyme, thus activating it. Vitamin B_{6} also plays a role in the synthesis of hormones, red blood cells, neurotransmitters and enzymes. A person who is deficient in Vitamin B_{6} could suffer from insomnia, as well as suffer damage to the central nervous system.

== Reactions ==
Pyridoxine 5′-phosphate oxidase catalyzes several reactions; the two most important are the deamination of pyridoxamine 5′-phosphate and the dehydrogenation (oxidation) of pyridoxine 5-phosphate, both of which are key intermediates in the metabolism of B_{6}. Pyridoxine 5′-phosphate oxidase's EC number is 1.4.3.5.

pyridoxamine 5′-phosphate + H_{2}O + O_{2} → pyridoxal 5′-phosphate + NH_{3} + H_{2}O_{2}

pyridoxine phosphate + O_{2} ⇌ H_{2}O_{2} + pyridoxal phosphate

Pyridoxine 5′-phosphate oxidase also plays a role in nitrogen metabolism, converting amines to aldehydes and NH_{3} by the reaction:

amine + H_{2}O + O_{2} ⇌ aldehyde + NH_{3} + H_{2}O_{2}

== Kinetics ==
In humans, the pyridoxine 5′-phosphate oxidase enzyme exhibits a low catalytic rate constant of 0.2 s^{−1}, with low K_{m} values for both pyridoxine 5′-phosphate and pyridoxamine 5′-phosphate. The enzyme also has a low turnover rate, meaning that it is relatively slow converting substrate to product. Pyridoxal 5′-phosphate is an effective product inhibitor. Since pyridoxal 5′-phosphate, the active form of vitamin B_{6}, is the product of the metabolic pathway, if it exists in excess, then the pathway need not proceed to keep making product. However, if it exists in low concentrations, then that is a signal for the pathway to synthesize more. This is an example of feedback inhibition.

== Pyridoxine 5′-phosphate oxidase in different organisms ==
Pyridoxine 5′-phosphate oxidase has been highly conserved over time, as there are many similarities between the enzyme as it is found in humans and Escherichia coli. Although there is only 39% retention of amino acid sequence from the E. coli version of the enzyme to the human version, the sequences for the FMN binding site and the substrate active sites are among the very highly conserved portion. One of the key differences is that the human pyridoxine 5′-phosphate oxidase has a higher specificity for the pyridoxamine 5′-phosphate substrate, whereas the pyridoxine 5′-phosphate oxidase in E. coli has a higher specificity pyridoxal 5′-phosphate substrate.

== Clinical significance ==
Mutations of the PNPO gene may result in the development of pyridoxamine 5'-phosphate oxidase deficiency, a disease presenting soon after birth with seizures and subsequent encephalopathy.
