= Pyridoxamine =

Vitamin

Names
- Preferred IUPAC name 4-(Aminomethyl)-5-(hydroxymethyl)-2-methylpyridin-3-ol

Identifiers
CAS Number	85-87-0
3D model (JSmol)	Interactive image
ChEBI	CHEBI:16410
ChEMBL	ChEMBL593019
ChemSpider	1023
ECHA InfoCard	100.001.491
KEGG	C00534
PubChem CID	1052
UNII	6466NM3W93
CompTox Dashboard (EPA)	DTXSID6046929
- InChI: InChI=1S/C8H12N2O2/c1-5-8(12)7(2-9)6(4-11)3-10-5/h3,11-12H,2,4,9H2,1H3 Key: NHZMQXZHNVQTQA-UHFFFAOYSA-N; InChI=1/C8H12N2O2/c1-5-8(12)7(2-9)6(4-11)3-10-5/h3,11-12H,2,4,9H2,1H3 Key: NHZMQXZHNVQTQA-UHFFFAOYAS
- SMILES: Oc1c(c(cnc1C)CO)CN

Properties
Chemical formula	C_{8}H_{12}N_{2}O_{2}
Molar mass	168.196 g·mol^{−1}
- Except where otherwise noted, data are given for materials in their standard state (at 25 °C [77 °F], 100 kPa). verify (what is ?) Infobox references

Pyridoxamine (PM) is one form of vitamin B_{6}. Chemically it is based on a pyridine ring structure, with hydroxyl, methyl, aminomethyl, and hydroxymethyl substituents. It differs from pyridoxine by the substituent at the 4-position. The hydroxyl at position 3 and aminomethyl group at position 4 of its ring endow pyridoxamine with a variety of chemical properties, including the scavenging of free radical species and carbonyl species formed in sugar and lipid degradation and chelation of metal ions that catalyze Amadori reactions.

== Research ==
Pyridoxamine can form fairly weak complexes with a number of transition metal ions, with a preference for Cu^{2+} and Fe^{3+}. The 3'-hydroxyl group of pyridoxamine allows for efficient hydroxyl radical scavenging.

Pyridoxamine inhibits the Maillard reaction and can block the formation of advanced glycation endproducts, which are associated with medical complications of diabetes. Pyridoxamine is hypothesized to trap intermediates in the formation of Amadori products released from glycated proteins, possibly preventing the breakdown of glycated proteins by disrupting the catalysis of this process through disruptive interactions with the metal ions crucial to the redox reaction. One research study found that pyridoxamine specifically reacts with the carbonyl group in Amadori products, but inhibition of post-Amadori reactions (that can lead to advanced glycation endproducts) is due in much greater part to the metal chelation effects of pyridoxamine.

A variety of preclinical studies in animal models of diabetes indicated that pyridoxamine improved kidney histology comparable or superior to aminoguanidine. Because of these results, pyridoxamine has been investigated for clinical utility in the treatment of diabetic nephropathy.

Pyridoxamine also inhibits the formation of advanced lipoxidation endproducts during lipid peroxidation reactions by reaction with dicarbonyl intermediates. In other preclinical research, pyridoxamine may be efficacious in treating diabetic neuropathy and retinopathy associated with diabetes and kidney stone disease. In one study, pyridoxamine was more effective at protecting from ionizing radiation-induced gastrointestinal epithelial apoptosis than amifostine (the only radioprotector currently Food and Drug Administration (FDA)-approved) due to pyridoxamine reactive oxygen species and reactive carbonyl species scavenging profile.

== FDA Regulatory Activity ==
Pyridoxamine was marketed as a dietary supplement, often as the hydrochloride salt, pyridoxamine dihydrochloride. However, in the United States, the FDA ruled in January 2009 that pyridoxamine must be regulated as a pharmaceutical drug because it is the active ingredient in Pyridorin, a drug designed by Biostratum, Inc., to prevent the progression of diabetic nephropathy.

Pyridorin had success in early clinical trials, found to be effective in slowing the progression of diabetic neuropathy in a phase II trial on 224 patients. However, in 2005 Biostratum ran out of money and so was unable to begin a Phase III trial. Investors in Biostratum had realized that because Biostratum had no patent on pyridoxamine itself, and that pyridoxamine was commonly available for purchase as a dietary supplement, the company would be unable to charge enough money for the treatment (should it be approved as a prescription drug by the FDA) for the investors to get a reasonable return on the investment they had already made (about $100M) much less on the additional investment a Phase III trial would require. To solve this problem, Biostratum submitted a citizen petition to the FDA on July 29, 2005, seeking to disallow sales of pyridoxamine-containing supplements on the grounds that pyridoxamine, as the subject of an Investigational New Drug Application with the FDA, is a drug and not a dietary supplement. This petition was opposed by the Council for Responsible Nutrition, a trade association of the dietary supplement industry.

On January 12, 2009, the FDA ruled that products containing pyridoxamine are excluded from the definition of dietary supplements as defined by the Dietary Supplement Health and Education Act of 1994. The FDA stated that the status of Pyridorin as an investigational new drug, as a result of an application filed by BioStratum in July 1999 and effective on September 1, 1999, meant that "the marketing of pyridoxamine in a dietary supplement is essentially equivalent to the marketing of an investigational new drug as a dietary supplement" because there was an "absence of independent, verifiable evidence that the substance was marketed as a food or a dietary supplement prior to its authorization for investigation as a new drug."

In 2006, Biostratum licensed its rights in Pyridorin to another company, NephroGenex In 2008, NephroGenex restarted the clinical development of Pyridorin, which as of 2012 is still ongoing.

NephroGenex conducted and completed a Phase 2b study and initiated a Phase 3 study of Pyridorin as treatment for diabetic neuropathy in patients with Type 2 diabetes. In February 24, 2016 NephroGenex was forced to pause the Phase 3 trial and ultimately terminate it later that year due to a lack of funding. The company subsequently filed for Chapter 11 bankruptcy on April 30, 2016. NephroGenex shortly thereafter sought out a corporate partner for licensing or acquisition of Pyridorin. The company retained the services of an investment banking firm which reached out to many prospective buyers, which by September 2016 had failed to consummate a transaction. NephroGenex then decided to sell all its assets, including Pyridorin, through a bankruptcy auction that was to be held on November 14, but was forced to cancel the auction after it did not receive any qualifying bids. On December 16, 2016, the company filed a motion with the bankruptcy court, proposing a liquidation plan. On August 24, 2017, the company's Investigational New Drug (IND) Applications with the FDA were withdrawn. Medpace, the Clinical Research Organization that conducted the Pyridorin Phase 3 trial, proposed and received approval for a Planned Support Agreement which transferred ownership of NephroGenex to Medpace. The new NephroGenex, renamed Medpace Research Inc., partnered with OxiPath Health Inc. to form a new venture, ViGuard Health Inc., with the intention of marketing the oral formulation of pyridoxamine as a dietary supplement, to which end it submitted, on October 3, 2017 a citizen petition to the FDA requesting the Commissioner issue a regulation stating pyridoxamine is a dietary supplement as defined by the Dietary Supplement Health and Education Act of 1994 DSHEA).

== See also ==
- Pyridoxamine-oxaloacetate transaminase
- Pyridoxamine-pyruvate transaminase
- Pyridoxamine-phosphate transaminase
- List of investigational antipsychotics
