= Vitamin B6 =

Class of vitamins

Vitamin B_{6}
- Drug class
- Pyridoxal 5'-phosphate, the metabolically active form of vitamin B_{6}

Class identifiers
- Use: Vitamin B_{6} deficiency
- ATC code: A11H
- Biological target: enzyme cofactor

Clinical data
- Drugs.com: International Drug Names

External links
- MeSH: D025101

Legal status

Vitamin B_{6} is one of the B vitamins, and is an essential nutrient for humans. The term essential nutrient refers to a group of six chemically similar compounds, i.e., "vitamers", which can be interconverted in biological systems. Its active form, pyridoxal 5′-phosphate, serves as a coenzyme in more than 140 enzyme reactions in amino acid, glucose, and lipid metabolism.

Plants synthesize pyridoxine as a means of protection from the UV-B radiation found in sunlight and for the role it plays in the synthesis of chlorophyll. Animals cannot synthesize any of the various forms of the vitamin, and hence must obtain it via diet, either of plants, or of other animals. There is some absorption of the vitamin produced by intestinal bacteria, but this is not sufficient to meet dietary needs. For adult humans, recommendations from various countries' food regulatory agencies are in the range of 1.0 to 2.0 milligrams (mg) per day. These same agencies also recognize ill effects from intakes that are too high, and so set safe upper limits, ranging from as low as 12 mg/day to as high as 100 mg/day depending on the country. Beef, pork, fowl and fish are generally good sources; dairy, eggs, mollusks and crustaceans also contain vitamin B_{6}, but at lower levels. There is enough in a wide variety of plant foods so that a vegetarian or vegan diet does not put consumers at risk for deficiency.

Dietary deficiency is rare. Classic clinical symptoms include rash and inflammation around the mouth and eyes, plus neurological effects that include drowsiness and peripheral neuropathy affecting sensory and motor nerves in the hands and feet. In addition to dietary shortfall, deficiency can be the result of anti-vitamin drugs. There are also rare genetic defects that can trigger vitamin B_{6} deficiency-dependent epileptic seizures in infants. These are responsive to pyridoxal 5'-phosphate therapy.

== Definition ==
Pyridoxine (PN)

Pyridoxamine (PM)

Pyridoxal (PL)

Vitamin B_{6} is a water-soluble vitamin, one of the B vitamins. The vitamin actually comprises a group of six chemically related compounds, i.e., vitamers, that all contain a pyridine ring as their core. These are pyridoxine, pyridoxal, pyridoxamine, and their respective phosphorylated derivatives pyridoxine 5'-phosphate, pyridoxal 5'-phosphate and pyridoxamine 5'-phosphate. Pyridoxal 5'-phosphate has the highest biological activity, but the others are convertible to that form. Vitamin B_{6} serves as a co-factor in more than 140 cellular reactions, mostly related to amino acid biosynthesis and catabolism, but is also involved in fatty acid biosynthesis and other physiological functions.

=== Forms ===
Because of its chemical stability, pyridoxine hydrochloride is the form most commonly given as vitamin B_{6} dietary supplement. 1.0 mg of pyridoxine hydrochloride provides 0.82 mg of pyridoxine. Absorbed pyridoxine (PN) is converted to pyridoxamine 5'-phosphate (PMP) by the enzyme pyridoxal kinase, with PMP further converted to pyridoxal 5'-phosphate (PLP), the metabolically active form, by the enzymes pyridoxamine-phosphate transaminase or pyridoxine 5'-phosphate oxidase, the latter of which also catalyzes the conversion of pyridoxine 5′-phosphate (PNP) to PLP. Pyridoxine 5'-phosphate oxidase is dependent on flavin mononucleotide (FMN) as a cofactor produced from riboflavin (vitamin B_{2}). For degradation, in a non-reversible reaction, PLP is catabolized to 4-pyridoxic acid, which is excreted in urine.

== Synthesis ==
=== Biosynthesis ===
Two pathways for PLP are currently known: one requires deoxyxylulose 5-phosphate (DXP), while the other does not, hence they are known as DXP-dependent and DXP-independent. These pathways have been studied extensively in Escherichia coli and Bacillus subtilis, respectively. Despite the disparity in the starting compounds and the different number of steps required, the two pathways possess many commonalities. The DXP-dependent pathway:

=== Commercial synthesis ===
The starting material is either the amino acid alanine, or propionic acid converted into alanine via halogenation and amination. Then, the procedure accomplishes the conversion of the amino acid into pyridoxine through the formation of an oxazole intermediate followed by a Diels–Alder reaction, with the entire process referred to as the "oxazole method". The product used in dietary supplements and food fortification is pyridoxine hydrochloride, the chemically stable hydrochloride salt of pyridoxine. Pyridoxine is converted in the liver into the metabolically active coenzyme form pyridoxal 5'-phosphate. At present, while the industry mainly utilizes the oxazole method, there is research exploring means of using less toxic and dangerous reagents in the process. Fermentative bacterial biosynthesis methods are also being explored, but are not yet scaled up for commercial production.

== Functions ==
PLP is involved in many aspects of macronutrient metabolism, neurotransmitter synthesis, histamine synthesis, hemoglobin synthesis and function, and gene expression. PLP generally serves as a coenzyme (cofactor) for many reactions including decarboxylation, transamination, racemization, elimination, replacement, and beta-group interconversion.

=== Amino acid metabolism ===
1. Transaminases break down amino acids with PLP as a cofactor. The proper activity of these enzymes is crucial for the process of moving amine groups from one amino acid to another. To function as a transaminase coenzyme, PLP bound to a lysine of the enzyme then binds to a free amino acid via formation of a Schiff's base. The process then dissociates the amine group from the amino acid, releasing a keto acid, then transfers the amine group to a different keto acid to create a new amino acid.
2. Serine racemase which synthesizes the neuromodulator D-serine from its enantiomer is a PLP-dependent enzyme.
3. PLP is a coenzyme needed for the proper function of the enzymes cystathionine synthase and cystathionase. These enzymes catalyze reactions in the catabolism of methionine. Part of this pathway (the reaction catalyzed by cystathionase) also produces cysteine.
4. Selenomethionine is the primary dietary form of selenium. PLP is needed as a cofactor for the enzymes that allow selenium to be used from the dietary form. PLP also plays a cofactor role in releasing selenium from selenohomocysteine to produce hydrogen selenide, which can then be used to incorporate selenium into selenoproteins.
5. PLP is required for the conversion of tryptophan to niacin, so low vitamin B_{6} status impairs this conversion.

=== Neurotransmitters ===
PLP is a cofactor in the biosynthesis of five important neurotransmitters: serotonin, dopamine, epinephrine, norepinephrine, and gamma-aminobutyric acid.

=== Glucose metabolism ===
PLP is a required coenzyme of glycogen phosphorylase, the enzyme necessary for glycogenolysis. Glycogen serves as a carbohydrate storage molecule, primarily found in muscle, liver and brain. Its breakdown frees up glucose for energy. PLP also catalyzes transamination reactions that are essential for providing amino acids as a substrate for gluconeogenesis, the biosynthesis of glucose.

=== Lipid metabolism ===
PLP is an essential component of enzymes that facilitate the biosynthesis of sphingolipids. Particularly, the synthesis of ceramide requires PLP. In this reaction, serine is decarboxylated and combined with palmitoyl-CoA to form sphinganine, which is combined with a fatty acyl-CoA to form dihydroceramide. This compound is then further desaturated to form ceramide. In addition, the breakdown of sphingolipids is also dependent on vitamin B_{6} because sphingosine-1-phosphate lyase, the enzyme responsible for breaking down sphingosine-1-phosphate, is also PLP-dependent.

=== Hemoglobin synthesis and function ===
PLP aids in the synthesis of hemoglobin, by serving as a coenzyme for the enzyme aminolevulinic acid synthase. It also binds to two sites on hemoglobin to enhance the oxygen binding of hemoglobin.

=== Gene expression ===
PLP has been implicated in increasing or decreasing the expression of certain genes. Increased intracellular levels of the vitamin lead to a decrease in the transcription of glucocorticoids. Vitamin B_{6} deficiency leads to the increased gene expression of albumin mRNA. Also, PLP influences expression of glycoprotein IIb by interacting with various transcription factors; the result is inhibition of platelet aggregation.

=== In plants ===
Plant synthesis of vitamin B_{6} contributes to protection from sunlight. Ultraviolet-B radiation (UV-B) from sunlight stimulates plant growth, but in high amounts can increase production of tissue-damaging reactive oxygen species (ROS), i.e., oxidants. Using Arabidopsis thaliana (common name: thale cress), researchers demonstrated that UV-B exposure increased pyridoxine biosynthesis, but in a mutant variety, pyridoxine biosynthesis capacity was not inducible, and as a consequence, ROS levels, lipid peroxidation, and cell proteins associated with tissue damage were all elevated. Biosynthesis of chlorophyll depends on aminolevulinic acid synthase, a PLP-dependent enzyme that uses succinyl-CoA and glycine to generate aminolevulinic acid, a chlorophyll precursor. In addition, plant mutants with severely limited capacity to synthesize vitamin B_{6} have stunted root growth, because synthesis of plant hormones such as auxin require the vitamin as an enzyme cofactor.

== Medical uses ==
Isoniazid is an antibiotic used for the treatment of tuberculosis. A common side effect is numbness in the hands and feet, also known as peripheral neuropathy. Co-treatment with vitamin B_{6} alleviates the numbness.

Overconsumption of seeds from Ginkgo biloba can deplete vitamin B_{6}, because the ginkgotoxin is an anti-vitamin (vitamin antagonist). Symptoms include vomiting and generalized convulsions. Ginkgo seed poisoning can be treated with vitamin B_{6}.

== Dietary recommendations ==
From regulatory agency to regulatory agency there is a wide range between what is considered Tolerable upper intake levels (ULs). The European Food Safety Authority (EFSA) adult UL for vitamin B_{6} is set at 12 mg/day versus 100 mg/day for the United States.

The US National Academy of Medicine updated Dietary Reference Intakes for many vitamins in 1998. Recommended Dietary Allowances (RDAs), expressed as milligrams per day, increase with age from 1.2 to 1.5 mg/day for women and from 1.3 to 1.7 mg/day for men. The RDA for pregnancy is 1.9 mg/day, for lactation, 2.0 mg/day. For children ages 1–13 years the RDA increases with age from 0.5 to 1.0 mg/day. As for safety, ULs for vitamins and minerals are identified when evidence is sufficient. In the case of vitamin B_{6} the US-established adult UL was set at 100 mg/day.

The EFSA refers to the collective set of information as Dietary Reference Values, with Population Reference Intake (PRI) instead of RDA. For women and men ages 15 and older the PRI is set at 1.6 and 1.7 mg/day, respectively; for pregnancy 1.8 mg/day, for lactation 1.7 mg/day. For children ages 1–14 years the PRIs increase with age from 0.6 to 1.4 mg/day. The EFSA also reviewed the safety question and in 2023 set an upper limit for vitamin B_{6} of 12 mg/day for adults, with lower amounts ranging from 2.2 to 10.7 mg/day for infants and children, depending on age. This replaced the adult UL set in 2008 at 25 mg/day.

The Japanese Ministry of Health, Labour and Welfare updated its vitamin and mineral recommendations in 2015. The adult RDAs are at 1.2 mg/day for women 1.4 mg/day for men. The RDA for pregnancy is 1.4 mg/day, for lactation is 1.5 mg/day. For children ages 1–17 years the RDA increases with age from 0.5 to 1.5 mg/day. The adult UL was set at 40–45 mg/day for women and 50–60 mg/day for men, with the lower values in those ranges for adults over 70 years of age.

=== Safety ===
Adverse effects have been documented from vitamin B_{6} dietary supplements, but never from food sources. Even though it is a water-soluble vitamin and is excreted in the urine, doses of pyridoxine in excess of the dietary upper limit (UL) over long periods cause painful and ultimately irreversible neurological problems. The primary symptoms are pain and numbness of the extremities. In severe cases, motor neuropathy may occur with "slowing of motor conduction velocities, prolonged F wave latencies, and prolonged sensory latencies in both lower extremities", causing difficulty in walking. Sensory neuropathy typically develops at doses of pyridoxine in excess of 1,000 mg per day. As noted above, in 2023 the European Food Safety Commission set an adult UL at 12 mg/day. While Australia has set an upper limit of 50 mg/day, the Therapeutic Goods Administration requires a label warning about peripheral neuropathy if the daily dose is predicted to exceed 10 mg/day.

=== Labeling ===
For US food and dietary supplement labeling purposes the amount in a serving is expressed as a percent of Daily Value. For vitamin B_{6} labeling purposes 100% of the Daily Value was 2.0 mg, but as of May 27, 2016, it was revised to 1.7 mg to bring it into agreement with the adult RDA. A table of the old and new adult daily values is provided at Reference Daily Intake.

== Sources ==
Bacteria residing in the large intestine are known to synthesize B-vitamins, including B_{6}, but the amounts are not sufficient to meet host requirements, in part because the vitamins are competitively taken up by non-synthesizing bacteria.

Vitamin B_{6} is found in a wide variety of foods. In general, meat, fish and fowl are good sources, but dairy foods and eggs are not (table). Crustaceans and mollusks contain about 0.1 mg/100 grams. Fruit (apples, oranges, pears) contain less than 0.1 mg/100g.

Bioavailability from a mixed diet (containing animal- and plant-sourced foods) is estimated at being 75% – higher for PLP from meat, fish and fowl, lower from plants, as those are mostly in the form of pyridoxine glucoside, which has approximately half the bioavailability of animal-sourced B_{6} because removal of the glucoside by intestinal cells is not 100% efficient. Given lower amounts and lower bioavailability of the vitamin from plants there was a concern that a vegetarian or vegan diet could cause a vitamin deficiency state. However, the results from a population-based survey conducted in the U.S. demonstrated that despite a lower vitamin intake, serum PLP was not significantly different between meat-eaters and vegetarians, suggesting that a vegetarian diet does not pose a risk for vitamin B_{6} deficiency.

Cooking, storage, and processing losses vary, and in some foods may be more than 50% depending on the form of vitamin present in the food. Plant foods lose less during processing, as they contain pyridoxine, which is more stable than the pyridoxal or pyridoxamine forms found in animal-sourced foods. For example, milk can lose 30–70% of its vitamin B_{6} content when dried. The vitamin is found in the germ and aleurone layer of grains, so there is more in grains from which these layers have not been removed, for example more in whole wheat bread than in white wheat bread, and more in brown rice than in white rice.

Most values shown in the table are rounded to nearest tenth of a milligram:

Source	Amount (mg per 100 grams)
Whey protein concentrate	1.2
Beef liver, pan-fried	1.0
Tuna, skipjack, cooked	1.0
Beef steak, grilled	0.9
Salmon, Atlantic, cooked	0.9
Chicken breast, grilled	0.7
Pork chop, cooked	0.6
Turkey, ground, cooked	0.6

Source	Amount (mg per 100 grams)
Pistachio	1.1
Mushroom, Shiitake, raw	0.3
Potato, baked, with skin	0.3
Sweet potato baked	0.3
Bell pepper, red	0.3
Peanuts	0.3
Avocado	0.25
Banana	0.21
Spinach	0.2
Tofu, firm	0.1

Source	Amount (mg per 100 grams)
Corn grits	0.1
Milk, whole	0.1 (one cup)
Yogurt	0.1 (one cup)
Almonds	0.1
Bread, whole wheat/white	0.2/0.1
Rice, cooked, brown/white	0.15/0.02
Beans, baked	0.1
Beans, green	0.1
Chicken egg	0.1

=== Fortification ===
As of 2024, eighteen countries require food fortification of wheat flour, maize flour or rice with vitamin B_{6} as pyridoxine hydrochloride. Most of these are in southeast Africa or Central America. The amounts stipulated range from 3.0 to 6.5 mg/kg. An additional six countries, including India, have a voluntary fortification program. India stipulates 2.0 mg/kg.

=== Dietary supplements ===
In the US, multi-vitamin/mineral products typically contain 2 to 4 mg of vitamin B_{6} per daily serving as pyridoxine hydrochloride. However, many US dietary supplement companies also market a B_{6}-only dietary supplement with 100 mg per daily serving. While the US National Academy of Medicine set an adult safety UL at 100 mg/day in 1998, in 2023 the European Food Safety Authority set its UL at 12 mg/day.

==== Health claims ====
The Japanese Ministry of Health, Labor, and Welfare (MHLW) set up the 'Foods for Specified Health Uses' (特定保健用食品; FOSHU) regulatory system in 1991 to individually approve the statements made on food labels concerning the effects of foods on the human body. The regulatory range of FOSHU was later broadened to allow for the certification of capsules and tablets. In 2001, MHLW enacted a new regulatory system, 'Foods with Health Claims' (保健機能食品; FHC), which consists of the existing FOSHU system and the newly established 'Foods with Nutrient Function Claims' (栄養機能表示食品; FNFC), under which claims were approved for any product containing a specified amount per serving of 12 vitamins, including vitamin B_{6}, and two minerals. To make a health claim based on a food's vitamin B_{6} content, the amount per serving must be in the range of 0.3–25 mg. The allowed claim is: "Vitamin B_{6} is a nutrient that helps produce energy from protein and helps maintain healthy skin and mucous membranes."

In 2010, the European Food Safety Authority (EFSA) published a review of proposed health claims for vitamin B_{6}, disallowing claims for bone, teeth, hair skin and nails, and allowing claims that the vitamin provided for normal homocysteine metabolism, normal energy-yielding metabolism, normal psychological function, reduced tiredness and fatigue, and provided for normal cysteine synthesis.

The US Food and Drug Administration (FDA) has several processes for permitting health claims on food and dietary supplement labels. There are no FDA-approved Health Claims or Qualified Health Claims for vitamin B_{6}. Structure/Function Claims can be made without FDA review or approval as long as there is some credible supporting science. Examples for this vitamin are "Helps support nervous system function" and "Supports healthy homocysteine metabolism."

== Absorption, metabolism and excretion ==
Vitamin B_{6} is absorbed in the jejunum of the small intestine by passive diffusion. Even extremely large amounts are well absorbed. Absorption of the phosphate forms involves their dephosphorylation catalyzed by the enzyme alkaline phosphatase. Most of the vitamin is taken up by the liver. There, the dephosphorylated vitamins are converted to the phosphorylated PLP, PNP and PMP, with the two latter converted to PLP. In the liver, PLP is bound to proteins, primarily albumin. The PLP-albumin complex is what is released by the liver to circulate in plasma. Protein-binding capacity is the limiting factor for vitamin storage. Total body stores, the majority in muscle, with a lesser amount in liver, have been estimated to be in the range of 61 to 167 mg.

Enzymatic processes utilize PLP as a phosphate-donating cofactor. PLP is restored via a salvage pathway that requires three key enzymes, pyridoxal kinase, pyridoxine 5'-phosphate oxidase, and phosphatases. Inborn errors in the salvage enzymes are known to cause inadequate levels of PLP in the cell, particularly in neuronal cells. The resulting PLP deficiency is known to cause or implicated in several pathologies, most notably infant epileptic seizures.

The half-life of vitamin B_{6} varies according to different sources: one source suggests that the half-life of pyridoxine is up to 20 days, while another source indicates half-life of vitamin B_{6} is in range of 25 to 33 days. After considering the different sources, it can be concluded that the half-life of vitamin B_{6} is typically measured in several weeks.

The end-product of vitamin B_{6} catabolism is 4-pyridoxic acid, which makes up about half of the B_{6} compounds in urine. 4-Pyridoxic acid is formed by the action of aldehyde oxidase in the liver. Amounts excreted increase within 1–2 weeks with vitamin supplementation and decrease as rapidly after supplementation ceases. Other vitamin forms excreted in the urine include pyridoxal, pyridoxamine and pyridoxine, and their phosphates. When large doses of pyridoxine are given orally, the proportion of these other forms increases. A small amount of vitamin B_{6} is also excreted in the feces. This may be a combination of unabsorbed vitamin and what was synthesized by large intestine microbiota.

== Deficiency ==
=== Signs and symptoms ===
The classic clinical syndrome for vitamin B_{6} deficiency is a seborrheic dermatitis-like eruption, atrophic glossitis with ulceration, angular cheilitis, conjunctivitis, intertrigo, abnormal electroencephalograms, microcytic anemia (due to impaired heme synthesis), and neurological symptoms of somnolence, confusion, depression, and neuropathy (due to impaired sphingosine synthesis).

In infants, a deficiency in vitamin B_{6} can lead to irritability, abnormally acute hearing, and convulsive seizures.

Less severe cases present with metabolic disease associated with insufficient activity of the coenzyme pyridoxal 5' phosphate (PLP). The most prominent of the lesions is due to impaired tryptophan–niacin conversion. This can be detected based on urinary excretion of xanthurenic acid after an oral tryptophan load. Vitamin B_{6} deficiency can also result in impaired transsulfuration of methionine to cysteine. The PLP-dependent transaminases and glycogen phosphorylase provide the vitamin with its role in gluconeogenesis, so deprivation of vitamin B_{6} results in impaired glucose tolerance.

=== Diagnosis ===
The assessment of vitamin B_{6} status is essential, as the clinical signs and symptoms in less severe cases are not specific. The three biochemical tests most widely used are plasma PLP concentrations, the activation coefficient for the erythrocyte enzyme aspartate aminotransferase, and the urinary excretion of vitamin B_{6} degradation products, specifically urinary PA. Of these, plasma PLP is probably the best single measure, because it reflects tissue stores. Plasma PLP of less than 10 nmol/L is indicative of vitamin B_{6} deficiency. A PLP concentration greater than 20 nmol/L has been chosen as a level of adequacy for establishing Estimated Average Requirements and Recommended Daily Allowances in the USA. Urinary PA is also an indicator of vitamin B_{6} deficiency; levels of less than 3.0 mmol/day is suggestive of vitamin B_{6} deficiency. Other methods of measurement, including UV spectrometric, spectrofluorimetric, mass spectrometric, thin-layer and high-performance liquid chromatographic, electrophoretic, electrochemical, and enzymatic, have been developed.

The classic clinical symptoms for vitamin B_{6} deficiency are rare, even in developing countries. A handful of cases were seen between 1952 and 1953, particularly in the United States, having occurred in a small percentage of infants who were fed a formula lacking in pyridoxine.

=== Causes ===
A deficiency of vitamin B_{6} alone is relatively uncommon and often occurs in association with other vitamins of the B complex. Evidence exists for decreased levels of vitamin B_{6} in women with type 1 diabetes and in patients with systemic inflammation, liver disease, rheumatoid arthritis, and those infected with HIV. Use of oral contraceptives and treatment with certain anticonvulsants, isoniazid, cycloserine, penicillamine, and hydrocortisone negatively impact vitamin B_{6} status. Hemodialysis reduces vitamin B_{6} plasma levels. Overconsumption of Ginkgo biloba seeds can also deplete vitamin B_{6}.

==== Genetic defects ====
Genetically confirmed diagnoses of diseases affecting vitamin B_{6} metabolism (ALDH7A1 deficiency, pyridoxine-5'-phosphate oxidase deficiency, PLP binding protein deficiency, hyperprolinaemia type II and hypophosphatasia) can trigger vitamin B_{6} deficiency-dependent epileptic seizures in infants. These are responsive to pyridoxal 5'-phosphate therapy.

== History ==
An overview of the history was published in 2012. In 1934, the Hungarian physician Paul György discovered a substance that was able to cure a skin disease in rats (dermatitis acrodynia). He named this substance vitamin B_{6}, as numbering of the B vitamins was chronological, and pantothenic acid had been assigned vitamin B_{5} in 1931. In 1938, Richard Kuhn was awarded the Nobel Prize in Chemistry for his work on carotenoids and vitamins, specifically B_{2} and B_{6}. Also in 1938, Samuel Lepkovsky isolated vitamin B_{6} from rice bran. A year later, Stanton A. Harris and Karl August Folkers determined the structure of pyridoxine and reported success in chemical synthesis, and then in 1942 Esmond Emerson Snell developed a microbiological growth assay that led to the characterization of pyridoxamine, the aminated product of pyridoxine, and pyridoxal, the formyl derivative of pyridoxine. Further studies showed that pyridoxal, pyridoxamine, and pyridoxine have largely equal activity in animals and owe their vitamin activity to the ability of the organism to convert them into the enzymatically active form pyridoxal-5-phosphate.

Following a recommendation of IUPAC-IUB in 1973, vitamin B_{6} is the official name for all 2-methyl,3-hydroxy,5-hydroxymethylpyridine derivatives exhibiting the biological activity of pyridoxine. Because these related compounds have the same effect, the word "pyridoxine" should not be used as a synonym for vitamin B_{6}.

== Research ==
Observational studies suggested an inverse correlation between a higher intake of vitamin B_{6} and all cancers, with the strongest evidence for gastrointestinal cancers. However, evidence from a review of randomized clinical trials did not support a protective effect. The authors noted that high B_{6} intake may be an indicator of higher consumption of other dietary protective micronutrients. A review and two observational trials reporting lung cancer risk reported that serum vitamin B_{6} was lower in people with lung cancer compared to people without lung cancer, but did not incorporate any intervention or prevention trials.

According to a prospective cohort study the long-term use of vitamin B_{6} from individual supplement sources at greater than 20 mg per day, which is more than ten times the adult male RDA of 1.7 mg/day, was associated with an increased risk for lung cancer among men. Smoking further elevated this risk. However, a more recent review of this study suggested that a causal relationship between supplemental vitamin B_{6} and an increased lung cancer risk cannot be confirmed yet.

For coronary heart disease, a meta-analysis reported lower relative risk for a 0.5 mg/day increment in dietary vitamin B_{6} intake. As of 2021, there were no published reviews of randomized clinical trials for coronary heart disease or cardiovascular disease. In reviews of observational and intervention trials, neither higher vitamin B_{6} concentrations nor treatment showed any significant benefit on cognition and dementia risk. Low dietary vitamin B_{6} correlated with a higher risk of depression in women but not in men. When treatment trials were reviewed, no meaningful treatment effect for depression was reported, but a subset of trials in pre-menopausal women suggested a benefit, with a recommendation that more research was needed. The results of several trials with children diagnosed as having autism spectrum disorder (ASD) treated with high dose vitamin B_{6} and magnesium did not result in treatment effect on the severity of symptoms of ASD.
