= D-glutamate(D-aspartate) oxidase =

Identifiers
- EC no.: 1.4.3.15

Databases
- BRENDA: enzyme data
- ExPASy: NiceZyme view
- KEGG: enzyme entry
- MetaCyc: metabolic pathway
- Rhea: reactions
- PDB structures: RCSB PDB PDBe PDBsum
- Gene Ontology: AmiGO / QuickGO
Search
- PMC: articles
- PubMed: articles
- NCBI: proteins

In enzymology, D-glutamate(D-aspartate) oxidase (EC 1.4.3.15) is an enzyme that catalyzes the chemical reaction

D-glutamic acid
+ H_{2}O
O_{2}
H_{2}O_{2}
O_{2}
H_{2}O_{2}
α-Ketoglutaric acid
+ NH_{3}

The three substrates of this enzyme are D-glutamic acid, water, and oxygen. Its products are α-ketoglutaric acid, hydrogen peroxide, and ammonia. The enzyme can also act in a similar way on D-aspartic acid.

This enzyme belongs to the family of oxidoreductases, specifically those acting on the CH-NH_{2} group of donors with oxygen as acceptor. The systematic name of this enzyme class is D-glutamate(D-aspartate):oxygen oxidoreductase (deaminating). Other names in common use include D-glutamic-aspartic oxidase, and D-monoaminodicarboxylic acid oxidase. This enzyme participates in alanine and aspartate metabolism. It employs one cofactor, flavin adenine dinucleotide.
