= Gibberellin 2beta-dioxygenase =

gibberellin 2-beta-dioxygenase

Identifiers
- EC no.: 1.14.11.13
- CAS no.: 85713-20-8

Databases
- IntEnz: IntEnz view
- BRENDA: BRENDA entry
- ExPASy: NiceZyme view
- KEGG: KEGG entry
- MetaCyc: metabolic pathway
- PRIAM: profile
- PDB structures: RCSB PDB PDBe PDBsum
- Gene Ontology: AmiGO / QuickGO
Search
- PMC: articles
- PubMed: articles
- NCBI: proteins

In enzymology, a gibberellin 2beta-dioxygenase (EC 1.14.11.13) is an enzyme that catalyzes the chemical reaction

gibberellin 1 + 2-oxoglutarate + O_{2} $\rightleftharpoons$ 2beta-hydroxygibberellin 1 + succinate + CO_{2}

The 3 substrates of this enzyme are gibberellin 1, 2-oxoglutarate, and O_{2}, whereas its 3 products are 2beta-hydroxygibberellin 1, succinate, and CO_{2}.

This enzyme belongs to the family of oxidoreductases, specifically those acting on paired donors, with O2 as oxidant and incorporation or reduction of oxygen. The oxygen incorporated need not be derived from O2 with 2-oxoglutarate as one donor, and incorporation of one atom o oxygen into each donor. The systematic name of this enzyme class is (gibberellin-1),2-oxoglutarate:oxygen oxidoreductase (2beta-hydroxylating). This enzyme is also called gibberellin 2beta-hydroxylase. This enzyme participates in diterpenoid biosynthesis.
