= Oxalosuccinic acid =

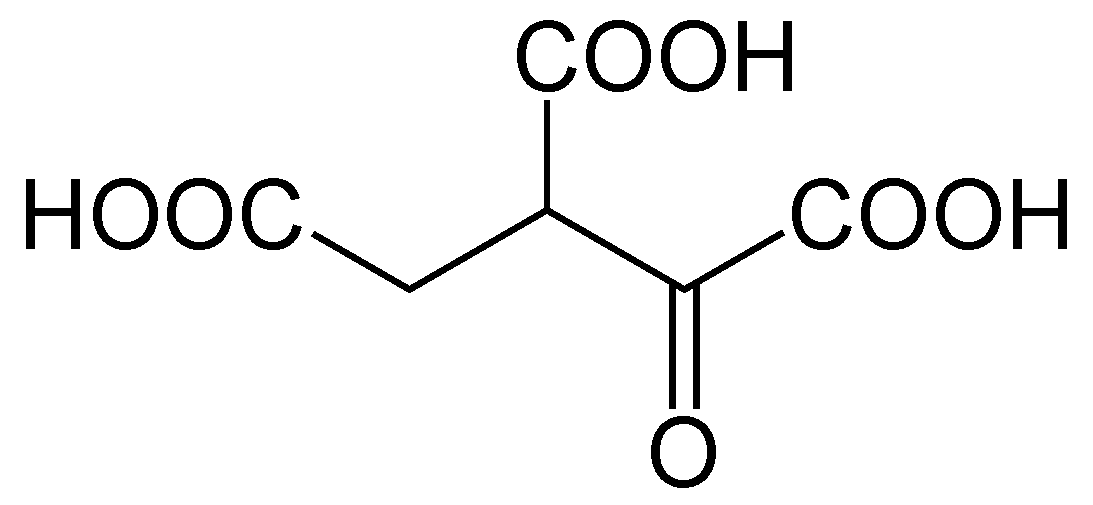

Names
- Preferred IUPAC name 1-Oxopropane-1,2,3-tricarboxylic acid

Identifiers
CAS Number	1948-82-9
3D model (JSmol)	Interactive image
ChEBI	CHEBI:7815
ChemSpider	947
ECHA InfoCard	100.230.021
KEGG	C05379
PubChem CID	972
UNII	DFK99PW32K
CompTox Dashboard (EPA)	DTXSID30862799
- InChI: InChI=1S/C6H6O7/c7-3(8)1-2(5(10)11)4(9)6(12)13/h2H,1H2,(H,7,8)(H,10,11)(H,12,13) Key: UFSCUAXLTRFIDC-UHFFFAOYSA-N; InChI=1/C6H6O7/c7-3(8)1-2(5(10)11)4(9)6(12)13/h2H,1H2,(H,7,8)(H,10,11)(H,12,13) Key: UFSCUAXLTRFIDC-UHFFFAOYAK
- SMILES: C(C(C(=O)C(=O)O)C(=O)O)C(=O)O

Properties
Chemical formula	C_{6}H_{6}O_{7}
Molar mass	190.108
- Except where otherwise noted, data are given for materials in their standard state (at 25 °C [77 °F], 100 kPa). verify (what is ?) Infobox references

Oxalosuccinic acid is a substrate of the citric acid cycle. It is acted upon by isocitrate dehydrogenase. Salts and esters of oxalosuccinic acid are known as oxalosuccinates.

Oxalosuccinic acid/oxalosuccinate is an unstable 6-carbon intermediate in the tricarboxylic acid cycle. It's a keto acid, formed during the oxidative decarboxylation of isocitrate to alpha-ketoglutarate, which is catalyzed by the enzyme isocitrate dehydrogenase. Isocitrate is first oxidized by coenzyme NAD+ to form oxalosuccinic acid/oxalosuccinate. Oxalosuccinic acid is both an alpha-keto and a beta-keto acid (an unstable compound) and it is the beta-ketoic property that allows the loss of carbon dioxide in the enzymatic reaction in conversion to the five-carbon molecule 2-oxoglutarate.
