= DTDP-3-amino-3,6-dideoxy-alpha-D-galactopyranose transaminase =

Identifiers
- EC no.: 2.6.1.90

Databases
- IntEnz: IntEnz view
- BRENDA: BRENDA entry
- ExPASy: NiceZyme view
- KEGG: KEGG entry
- MetaCyc: metabolic pathway
- PRIAM: profile
- PDB structures: RCSB PDB PDBe PDBsum
Search
- PMC: articles
- PubMed: articles
- NCBI: proteins

DTDP-3-amino-3,6-dideoxy-alpha-D-galactopyranose transaminase (EC 2.6.1.90, dTDP-6-deoxy-D-xylohex-3-uloseaminase, FdtB, TDP-3-keto-6-deoxy-D-galactose-3-aminotransferase, RavAMT, TDP-3-keto-6-deoxy-D-galactose 3-aminotransferase, TDP-3-dehydro-6-deoxy-D-galactose 3-aminotransferase) is an enzyme with systematic name dTDP-3-amino-3,6-dideoxy-alpha-D-galactopyranose:2-oxoglutarate aminotransferase. This enzyme catalyses the following chemical reaction

dTDP-3-amino-3,6-dideoxy-alpha-D-galactopyranose + 2-oxoglutarate $\rightleftharpoons$ dTDP-3-dehydro-6-deoxy-alpha-D-galactopyranose + L-glutamate

This enzyme is a pyridoxal-phosphate protein.
