= Isocitrate dehydrogenase =

Class of enzymes

Isocitrate dehydrogenase (NADP+)
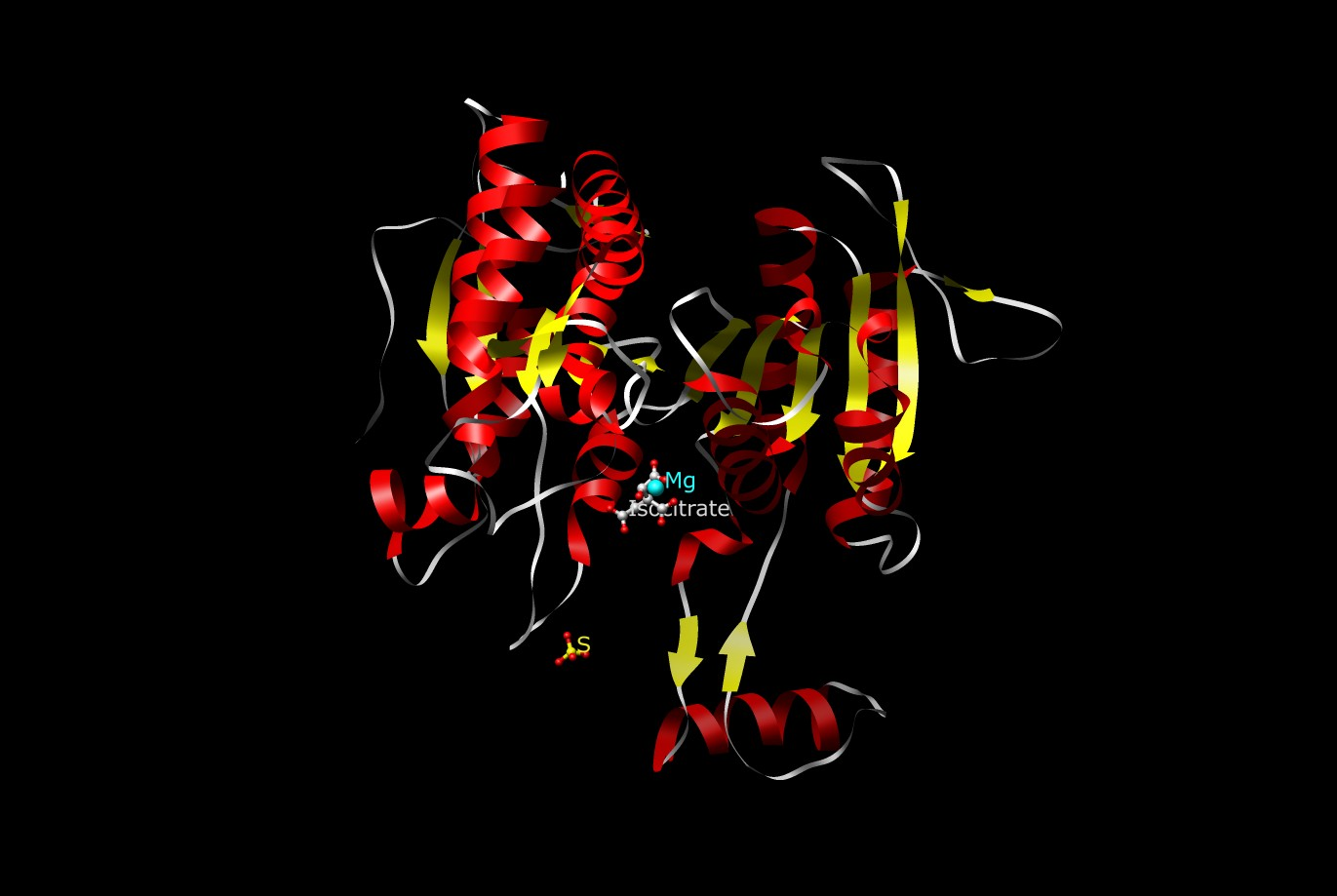
- Crystallographic structure of E. coli isocitrate dehydrogenase. There are three active sites. Three isocitrates, one isocitrate in the binding site for NADP^{+}.

Identifiers
- EC no.: 1.1.1.42
- CAS no.: 9028-48-2

Databases
- BRENDA: enzyme data
- ExPASy: NiceZyme view
- KEGG: enzyme entry
- MetaCyc: metabolic pathway
- Rhea: reactions
- PDB structures: RCSB PDB PDBe PDBsum
- Gene Ontology: AmiGO / QuickGO
Search
- PMC: articles
- PubMed: articles
- NCBI: proteins

isocitrate dehydrogenase (NAD^{+})

Identifiers
- EC no.: 1.1.1.41
- CAS no.: 9001-58-5

Databases
- BRENDA: enzyme data
- ExPASy: NiceZyme view
- KEGG: enzyme entry
- MetaCyc: metabolic pathway
- Rhea: reactions
- PDB structures: RCSB PDB PDBe PDBsum
- Gene Ontology: AmiGO / QuickGO
Search
- PMC: articles
- PubMed: articles
- NCBI: proteins

Monomeric isocitrate dehydrogenase
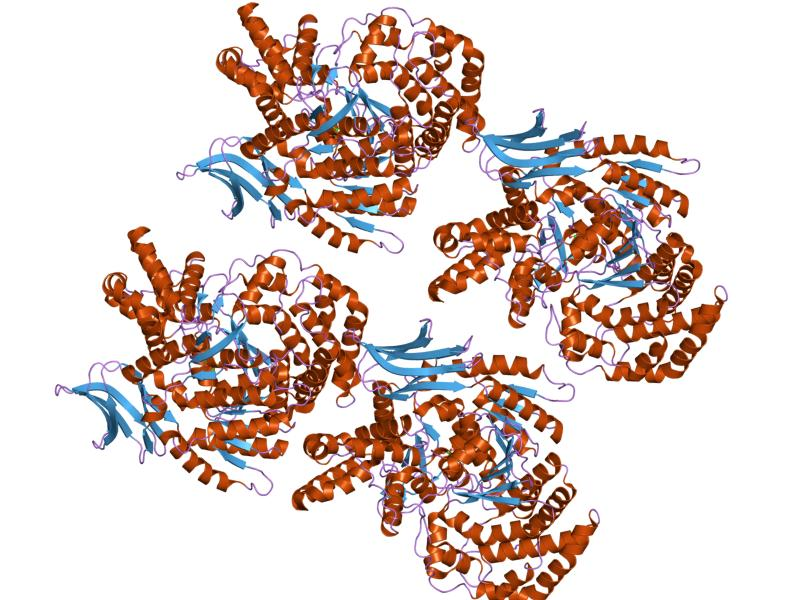
- crystal structure of the monomeric isocitrate dehydrogenase in complex with isocitrate and mn

Identifiers
- Symbol: IDH
- Pfam: PF03971
- Pfam clan: CL0270
- InterPro: IPR004436
- SCOP2: 1ofg / SCOPe / SUPFAM
Available protein structures:
- PDB: IPR004436 PF03971 (ECOD; PDBsum)
- AlphaFold: IPR004436; PF03971

Isocitrate dehydrogenases (IDH) (EC 1.1.1.42, EC 1.1.1.41) are a type of enzyme that catalyze the oxidative decarboxylation of isocitrate, producing alpha-ketoglutarate (α-ketoglutarate) and CO_{2}. This is a two-step process, which involves oxidation of isocitrate (a secondary alcohol) to oxalosuccinate (a ketone), followed by the decarboxylation of the carboxyl group beta to the ketone, forming alpha-ketoglutarate.

In humans, IDH exists in three isoforms: IDH3 (EC 1.1.1.41) is a protein complex that catalyzes the third step of the citric acid cycle while converting NAD^{+} to NADH in the mitochondria. The isoforms IDH1 and IDH2 (EC 1.1.1.42) catalyze the same reaction outside the context of the citric acid cycle except they use NADP^{+} as a cofactor instead of NAD^{+}. They localize to the cytosol as well as the mitochondria and peroxisomes.

== Structure ==
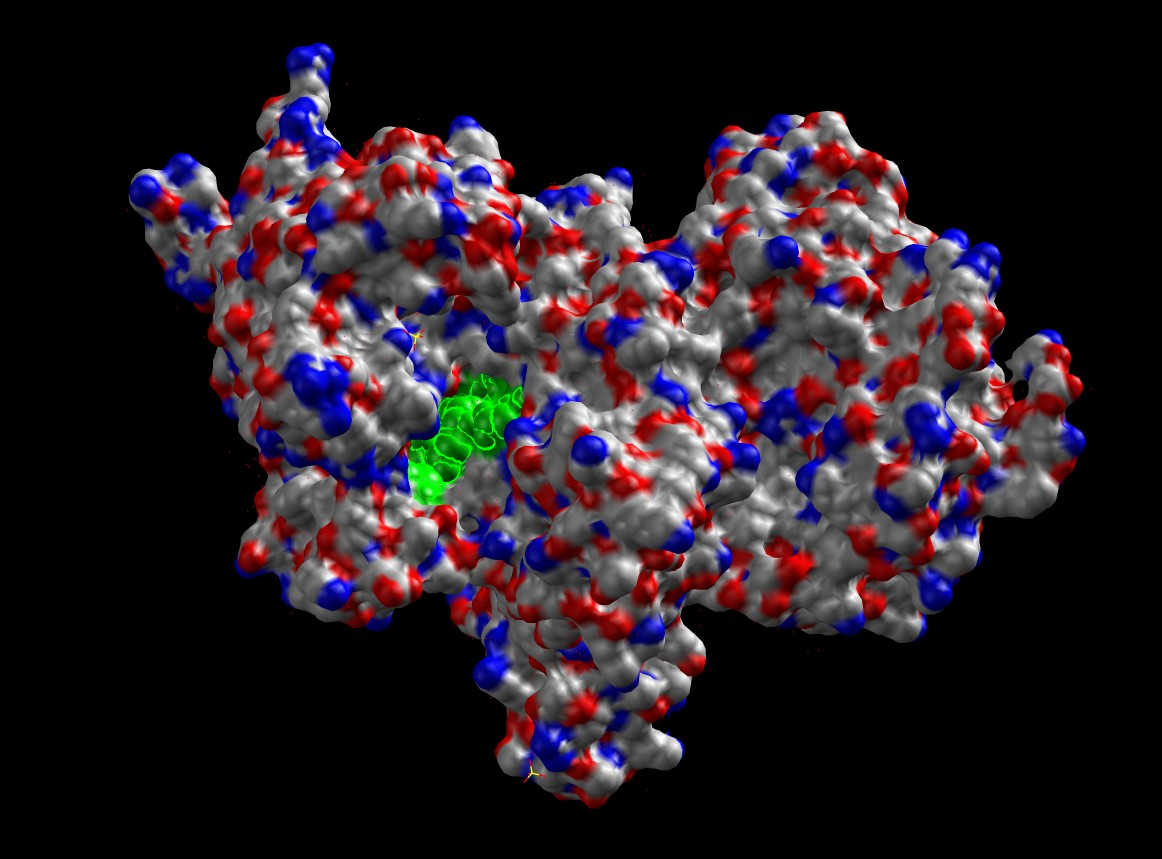
One active site on the Porcine NADP^{+} dependent enzyme (green). Porcine enzyme is a homodimer and has another active site on the other side.

In humans, the NAD-dependent (EC 1.1.1.41) enzyme IDH3 is composed of three subunits IDH3A, IDH3B, and IDH3G. It is allosterically regulated, and requires an integrated Mg^{2+} or Mn^{2+} ion. The closest homologue that has a known structure is the E. coli NADP-dependent IDH, which has only two subunits and a 13% identity and 29% similarity based on the amino acid sequences, making it dissimilar to human IDH and not suitable for close comparison. All the known NADP-IDHs are homodimers.

Most isocitrate dehydrogenases are dimers, to be specific, homodimers (two identical monomer subunits forming one dimeric unit). In comparing C. glutamicum and E. coli, monomer and dimer, respectively, both enzymes were found to "efficiently catalyze identical reactions." However, C. glutamicum was recorded as having ten times as much activity than E. coli and seven times more affinitive/specific for NADP. C. glutamicum favored NADP^{+} over NAD^{+}. In terms of stability with response to temperature, both enzymes had a similar Tm or melting temperature at about 55 °C to 60 °C. However, the monomer C. glutamicum showed a more consistent stability at higher temperatures, which was expected. The dimer E. coli showed stability at a higher temperature than normal due to the interactions between the two monomeric subunits.

The structure of Mycobacterium tuberculosis (Mtb) ICDH-1 bound with NADPH and Mn(2+) bound has been solved by X-ray crystallography. It is a homodimer in which each subunit has a Rossmann fold, and a common top domain of interlocking β sheets. Mtb ICDH-1 is most structurally similar to the R132H mutant human ICDH found in CNS WHO grade 4 astrocytomas, formerly classified as glioblastomas. Similar to human R132H ICDH, Mtb ICDH-1 also catalyzes the formation of α-hydroxyglutarate.

== Regulation ==
The IDH step of the citric acid cycle is often (but not always) an irreversible reaction due to its large negative change in free energy. It must therefore be carefully regulated to avoid depletion of isocitrate (and therefore an accumulation of alpha-ketoglutarate). The reaction is stimulated by the simple mechanisms of substrate availability (isocitrate, NAD^{+} or NADP^{+}, Mg^{2+} / Mn^{2+} ), product inhibition by NADH (or NADPH outside the citric acid cycle) and alpha-ketoglutarate, and competitive feedback inhibition by ATP. A conserved ncRNA upstream of the icd gene which codes for NADP^{+}-dependent isocitrate dehydrogenase (IDH) has been reported in bacterial genomes, due to its characteristics this ncRNA resembles previous regulatory motifs called riboswitches, icd-II ncRNA motif has been proposed as a strong candidate riboswitch.

== Catalytic mechanisms ==
Isocitrate dehydrogenase catalyzes the chemical reactions:

Isocitric acid
+ NAD^{+}
H^{+}
H^{+}
α-Ketoglutaric acid
+ CO_{2} + NADH

and the same reaction where the oxidizing agent is NADP^{+} instead of NAD^{+}.

The overall free energy for this reaction is -8.4 kJ/mol.

Catalytic mechanism of the breakdown of isocitrate into oxalosuccinate, then into a final product of alpha-ketuglutarate. The oxalosuccinate intermediate is hypothetical; it has never been observed in the decarboxylating version of the enzyme.

=== Steps ===
Within the citric acid cycle, isocitrate, produced from the isomerization of citrate, undergoes both oxidation and decarboxylation. The enzyme isocitrate dehydrogenase (IDH) holds isocitrate within its active site using the surrounding amino acids, including arginine, tyrosine, asparagine, serine, threonine, and aspartic acid.

In the provided figure, the first box shows the overall isocitrate dehydrogenase reaction. The necessary reactants for this enzyme mechanism are isocitrate, NAD^{+}/NADP^{+}, and Mn^{2+} or Mg^{2+}. The products of the reaction are alpha-ketoglutarate, carbon dioxide, and NADH + H^{+}/NADPH + H^{+}. Water molecules help to deprotonate the oxygen atoms of isocitrate.

The second box in the figure illustrates step 1 of the reaction, which is the oxidation of the alpha-carbon (C2 here, also called alpha-C). In this process, the alcohol group of the alpha-carbon is deprotonated and the resulting lone pair of electrons forms a ketone group on that carbon. NAD^{+}/NADP^{+} acts as an electron-accepting cofactor and collects the resulting hydride from C2. The oxidation of the alpha carbon introduces a molecular arrangement where electrons (in the next step) will flow from the nearby carboxyl group and push the electrons of the double bonded oxygen up onto the oxygen atom itself, which collects a proton from a nearby lysine.

The third box illustrates step 2, which is the decarboxylation of oxalosuccinate. In this step, the carboxyl group oxygen is deprotonated by a nearby tyrosine, and those electrons flow down to C2. Carbon dioxide, the leaving group, detaches from the beta carbon of isocitrate (C3) and the electrons flow to the ketone oxygen attached to the alpha carbon, granting a negative charge to the associated oxygen atom and forming an alpha-beta unsaturated double bond between carbons 2 and 3.

The fourth and final box illustrates step 3, which is the saturation of the alpha-beta unsaturated double bond that formed in the previous step. The negatively charged oxygen (attached to the alpha-carbon) donates its electrons, reforming the ketone double bond and pushing another lone pair (the one that forms the double bond between the alpha and beta carbons) "off" the molecule. This lone pair, in turn, picks up a proton from the nearby tyrosine. This reaction results in the formation of alpha-ketoglutarate, NADH + H^{+}/NADPH + H^{+}, and CO_{2}.

=== Detailed mechanism ===
Two aspartate amino acid residues (below left) are interacting with two adjacent water molecules (w6 and w8) in the Mn^{2+} isocitrate porcine IDH complex to deprotonate the alcohol off the alpha-carbon atom. The oxidation of the alpha-C also takes place in this picture where NAD^{+} accepts a hydride resulting in oxalosuccinate. Along with the sp^{3} to sp^{2} stereochemical change around the alpha-C, there is a ketone group that is formed from the alcohol group. The formation of this ketone double bond allows for resonance to take place as electrons coming down from the leaving carboxylate group move towards the ketone.

The decarboxylation of oxalosuccinate (below center) is a key step in the formation of alpha-ketoglutarate. In this reaction, the lone pair on the adjacent Tyrosine hydroxyl abstracts the proton off the carboxyl group. This carboxyl group is also referred to as the beta subunit in the isocitrate molecule. The deprotonation of the carboxyl group causes the lone pair of electrons to move down making carbon dioxide and separating from oxalosuccinate. The electrons continue to move towards the alpha carbon pushing the double bond electrons (making the ketone) up to abstract a proton off an adjacent lysine residue. An alpha-beta unsaturated double bond results between carbon 2 and three. As you can see in the picture, the green ion represents either Mg^{2+} or Mn^{2+}, which is a cofactor necessary for this reaction to occur. The metal-ion forms a little complex through ionic interactions with the oxygen atoms on the fourth and fifth carbons (also known as the gamma subunit of isocitrate).

After the carbon dioxide is split from the oxalosuccinate in the decarboxylation step (below right), the enol will tautomerize to the keto from. The formation of the ketone double bond is started by the deprotonation of that oxygen off the alpha carbon (C#2) by the same lysine that protonated the oxygen in the first place. The lone pair of electrons moves down kicking off the lone pairs that were making the double bond. This lone pair of electrons abstracts a proton off the Tyrosine that deprotonated the carboxyl group in the decarboxylation step. The reason that we can say that the Lys and Tyr residues will be the same from the previous step is because they are helping in holding the isocitrate molecule in the active site of the enzyme. These two residues will be able to form hydrogen bonds back and forth as long as they are close enough to the substrate.

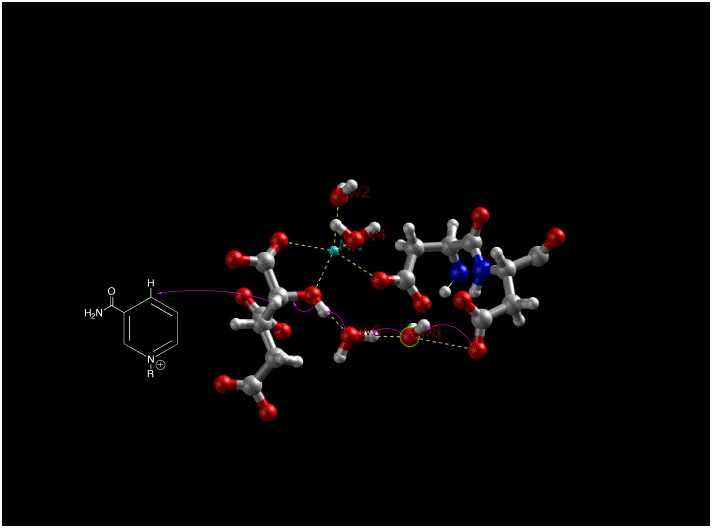
Oxidoreductase step where NAD^{+} is used to accept a hydride.

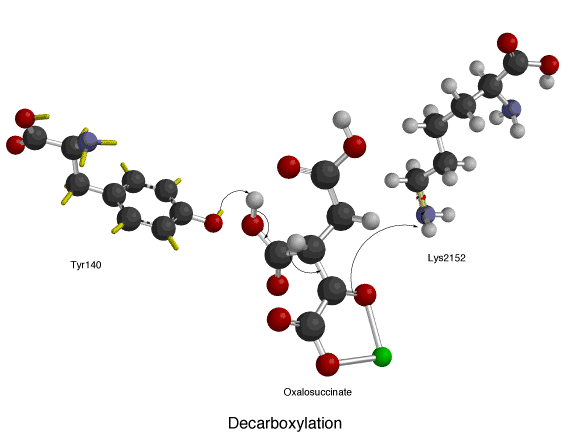
Decarboxylation of oxalosuccinate.

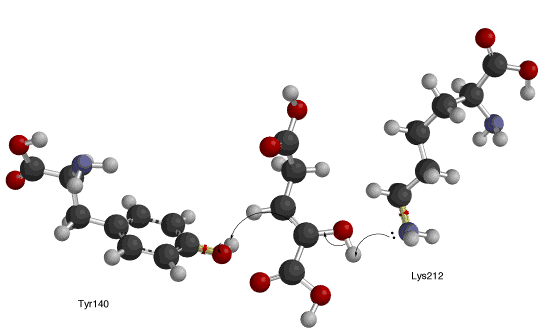
Saturation of the alpha-beta unsaturated double bond.

The isocitrate dehydrogenase enzyme as stated above produces alpha-ketoglutarate, carbon dioxide, and NADH + H^{+}/NADPH + H^{+}. There are three changes that occurred throughout the reaction. The oxidation of Carbon 2, the decarboxylation (loss of carbon dioxide) off Carbon 3, and the formation of a ketone group with a stereochemical change from sp^{3} to sp^{2}.

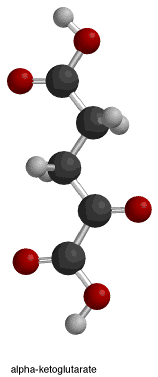

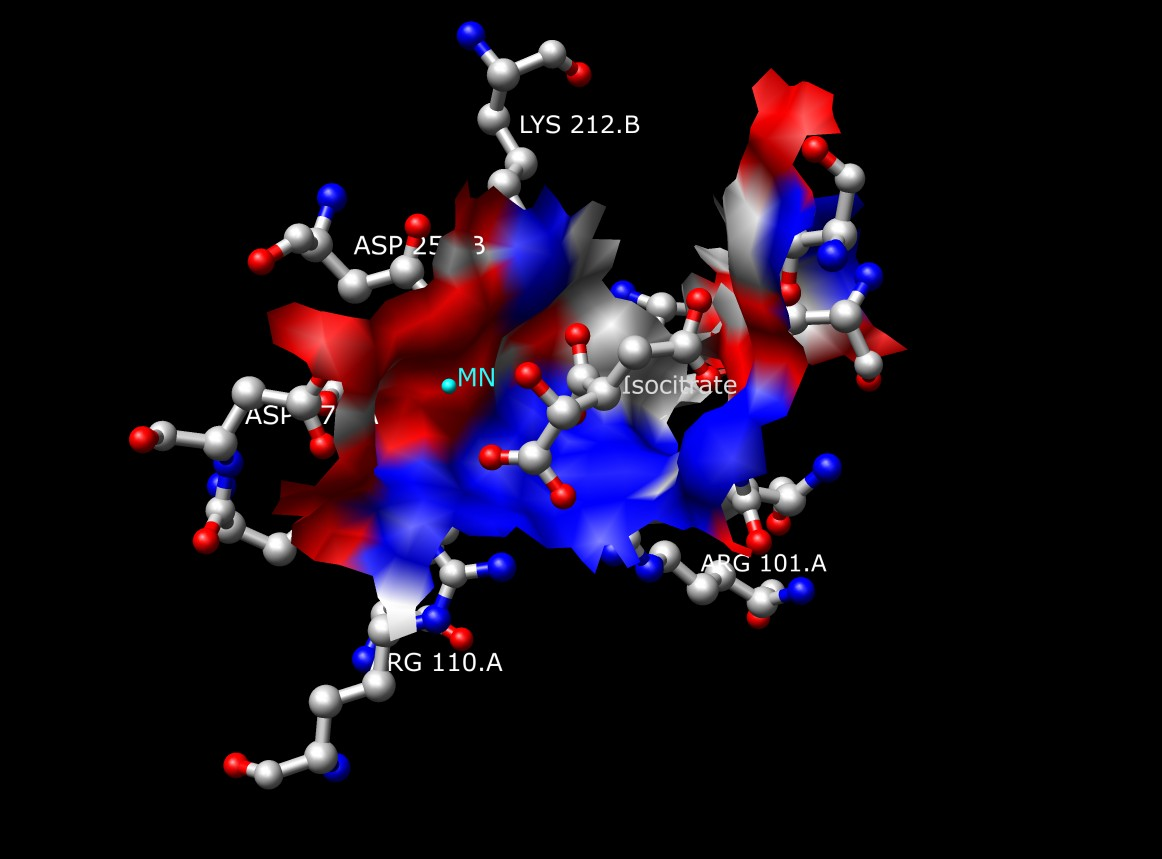
Porcine Mitochondrial NADP^{+}-dependent isocitrate dehydrogenase complexed with Mn^{2+} and isocitrate. Surface view of the active site pocket where isocitrate is bounded by polar amino acids.

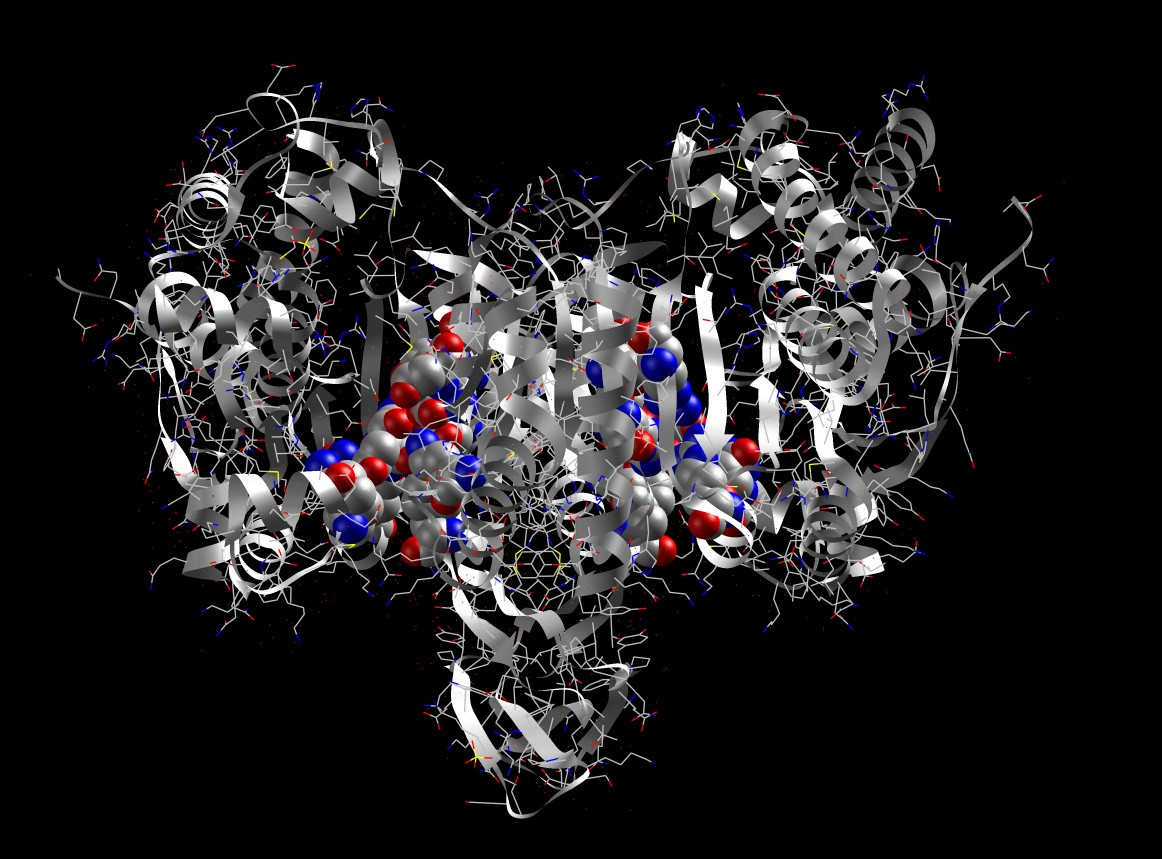
Porcine Mitochondrial NADP^{+}-dependent Isocitrate Dehydrogenase Complexed with Mn^{2+} and Isocitrate.

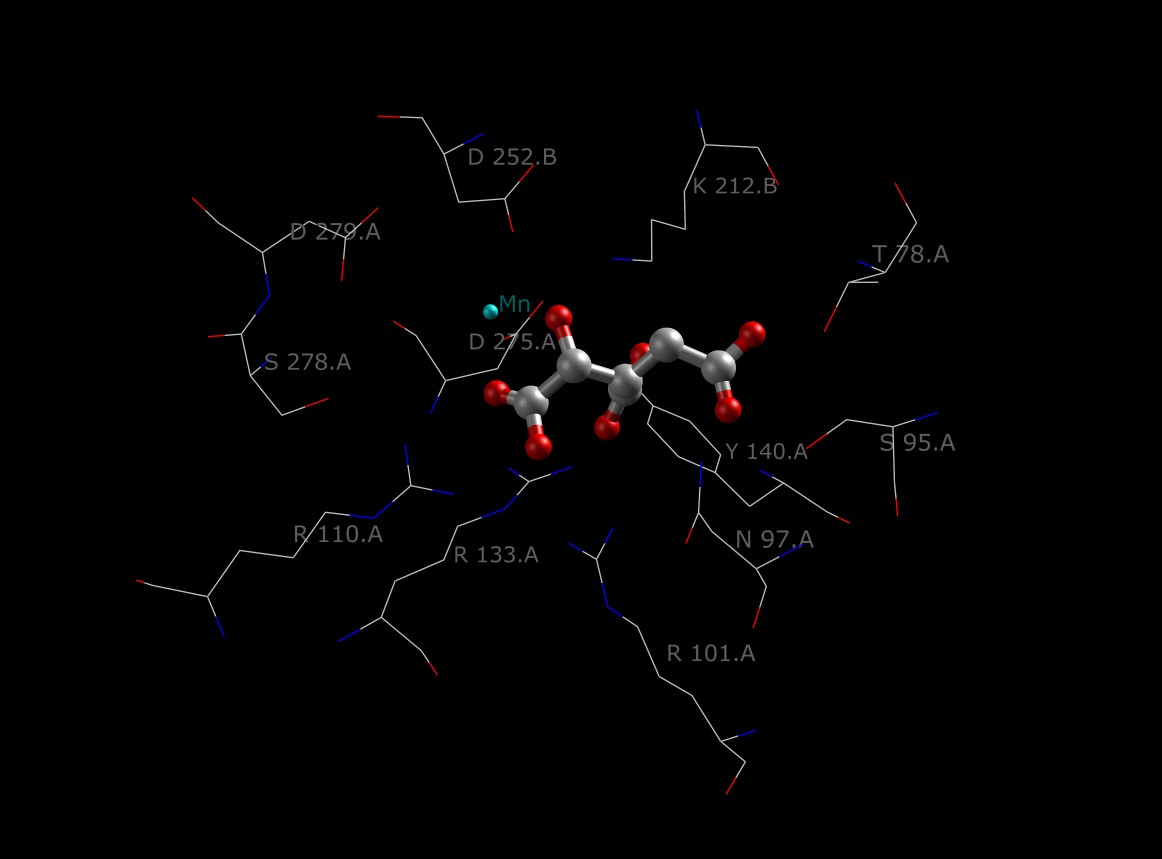
Porcine Enzyme complex; Active site isocitrate and adjacent A.A.

=== Active site ===
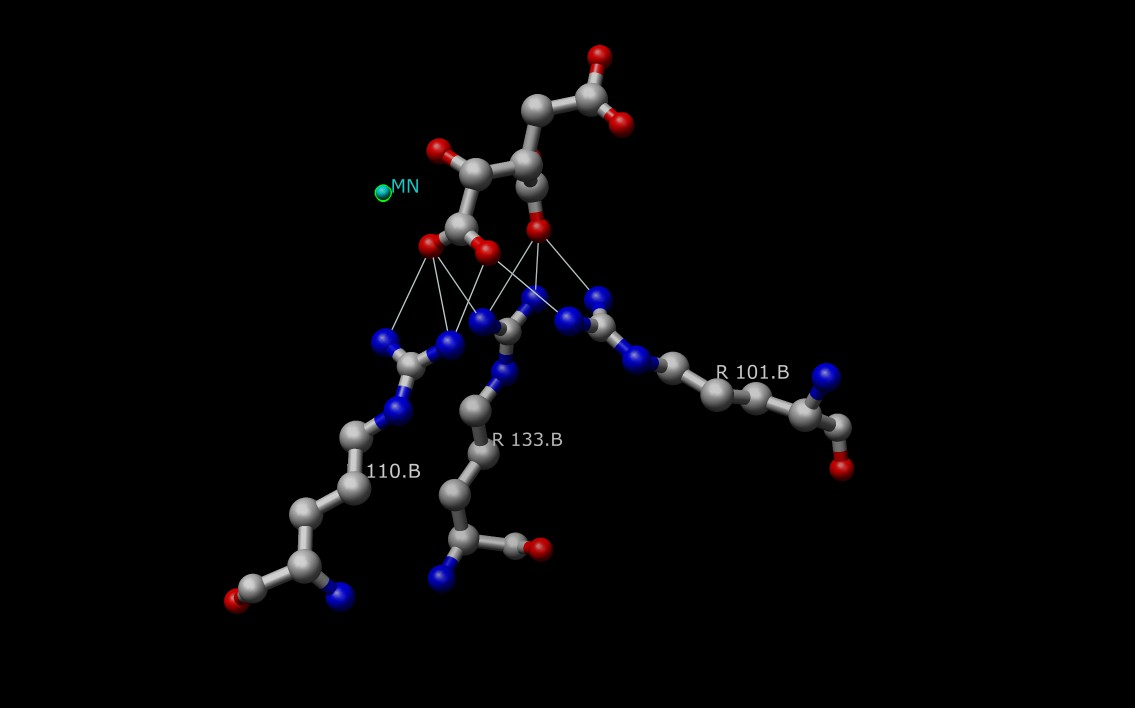
Porcine IDH complex, Arg AA stabilizing isocitrate in the active site. residues Arg110, Arg133, and Arg101 are the three main stabilizing amino acids. They help to hold isocitrate in the active site and in the right orientation for isocitrate dehydrogenase to take place.

The Isocitrate Dehydrogenase (IDH) enzyme structure in Escherichia coli was the first IDH ortholog structure to be elucidated and understood. Since then, the Escherichia coli IDH structure has been used by most researchers to make comparisons to other isocitrate dehydrogenase enzymes. There is much detailed knowledge about this bacterial enzyme, and it has been found that most isocitrate dehydrogenases are similar in structure and therefore also in function. This similarity of structure and function gives a reason to believe that the structures are conserved as well as the amino acids. Therefore, the active sites amongst most prokaryotic isocitrate dehydrogenase enzymes should be conserved as well, which is observed throughout many studies done on prokaryotic enzymes. Eukaryotic isocitrate dehydrogenase enzymes on the other hand, have not been fully discovered yet. Each dimer of IDH has two active sites. Each active site binds a NAD^{+}/NADP^{+} molecule and a divalent metal ion (Mg^{2+},Mn^{2+}). In general, each active site has a conserved sequence of amino acids for each specific binding site. In Desulfotalea psychrophila (DpIDH) and porcine (PcIDH) there are three substrates bound to the active site.

1. Isocitrate binds within the active site to a conserved sequence of about eight amino acids through hydrogen bonds. These acids include (may vary in residue but with similar properties) tyrosine, serine, asparagine, arginine, arginine, arginine, tyrosine, and lysine. Their positions on the backbone vary but they are all within a close range (i.e. Arg131 DpIDH and Arg133 PcIDH, Tyr138 DpIDH and Tyr140 PcIDH).
2. The metal ion (Mg^{2+}, Mn^{2+}) binds to three conserved amino acids through hydrogen bonds. These amino acids include three Aspartate residues.
3. NAD^{+} and NADP^{+} bind within the active site within four regions with similar properties amongst IDH enzymes. These regions vary but are around [250–260], [280–290], [300–330], and [365–380]. Again regions vary but the proximity of regions are conserved.

== Clinical significance ==
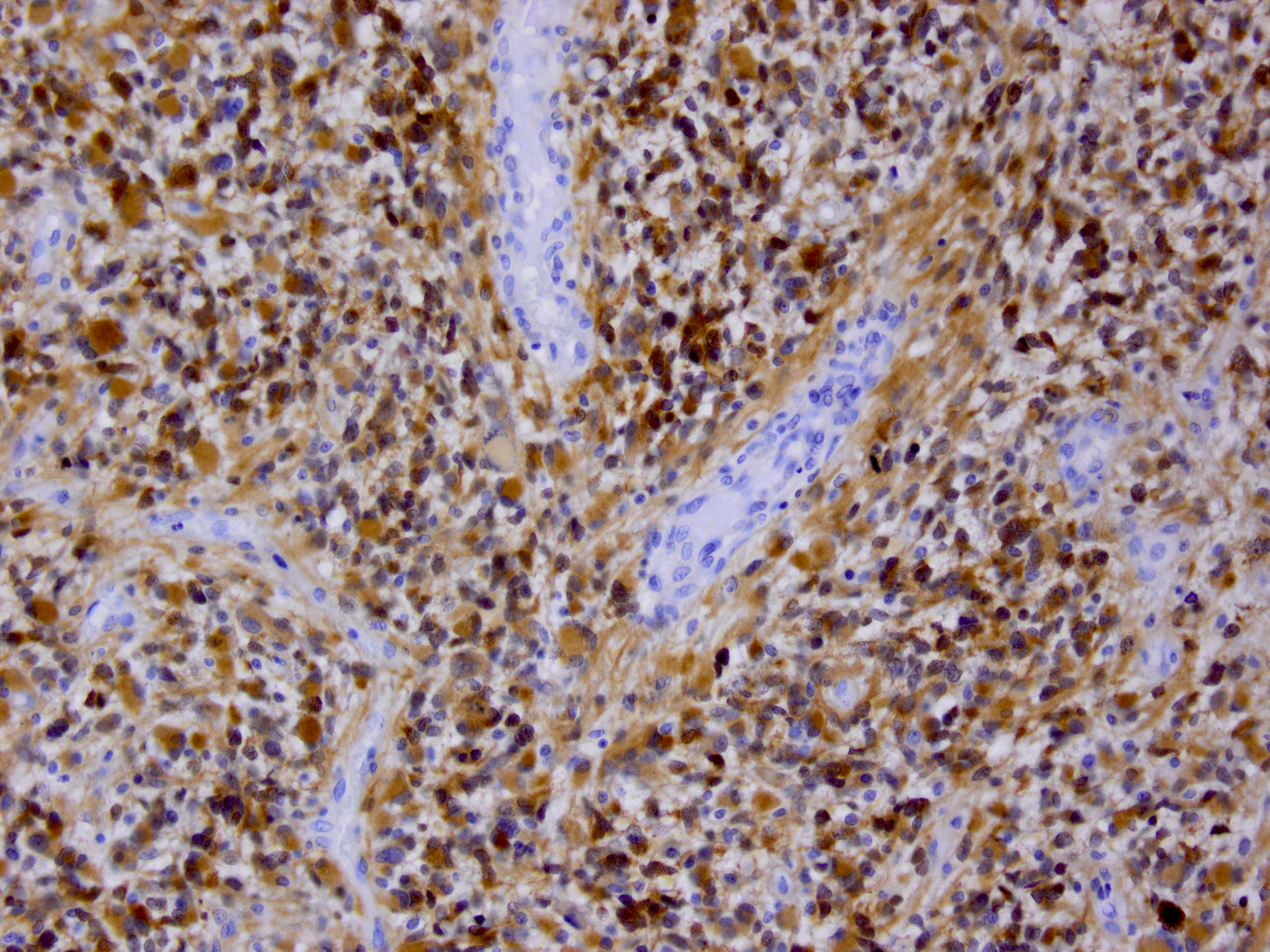
Expression of mutated IDH1 protein in a case of CNS WHO grade 4 astrocytoma. Immunohistochemistry using a mouse monoclonal antibody targeting the IDH1 R132H mutation.

Specific mutations in the isocitrate dehydrogenase gene IDH1 have been found in several tumor types, notably brain tumors including astrocytoma and oligodendroglioma. Patients whose tumor had an IDH1 mutation had longer survival compared to patients whose tumor had an IDH1 wild type. Furthermore, mutations of IDH2 and IDH1 were found in up to 20% of cytogenetically normal acute myeloid leukemia (AML). These mutations are known to produce D-2-hydroxyglutarate from alpha-ketoglutarate. D-2-hydroxyglutarate accumulates to very high concentrations which inhibits the function of enzymes that are dependent on alpha-ketoglutarate. This leads to a hypermethylated state of DNA and histones, which results in different gene expression that can activate oncogenes and inactivate tumor-suppressor genes. Ultimately, this may lead to the types of cancer described above. Somatic mosaic mutations of this gene have also been found associated to Ollier disease and Maffucci syndrome. However, recent studies have also shown that D-2-hydroxyglutarate may be converted back into alpha-ketoglutarate either enzymatically or non-enzymatically. Further studies are required to fully understand the roles of IDH1 mutation (and D-2-hydroxyglutarate) in cancer. Recent research highlighted cancer-causing mutations in isocitrate dehydrogenase which may cause accumulation of the metabolite D-2-hydroxyglutarate (D-2HG). Notarangelo et al. showed that such high concentrations of D-2HG could act as a direct inhibitor of lactate dehydrogenase in mouse T cells. Inhibition of this metabolic enzyme altered glucose metabolism in the T cells and inhibited their proliferation, cytokine production, and ability to kill target cells.

== Isozymes ==
The following is a list of human isocitrate dehydrogenase isozymes:

=== NADP^{+} dependent ===
Each NADP^{+}-dependent isozyme functions as a homodimer:

isocitrate dehydrogenase 1 (NADP^{+}), soluble
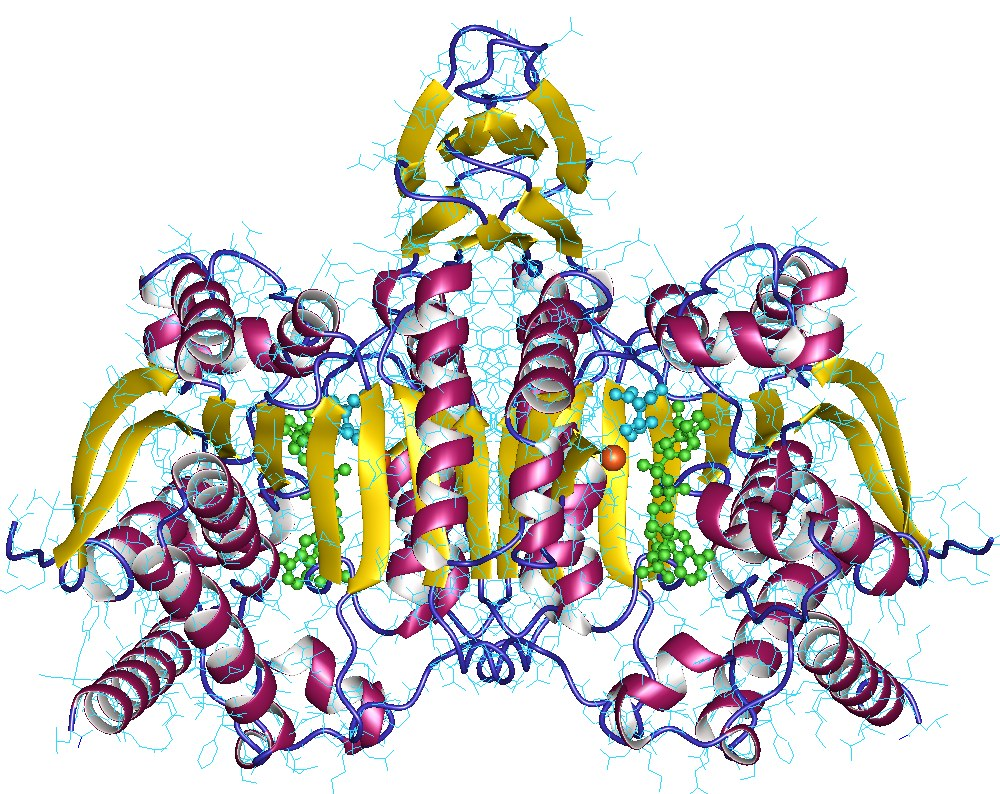
- isocitrate dehydrogenase dimer, Human

Identifiers
- Symbol: IDH1
- NCBI gene: 3417
- HGNC: 5382
- OMIM: 147700
- RefSeq: NM_005896
- UniProt: O75874

Other data
- EC number: 1.1.1.42
- Locus: Chr. 2 q32-qter
Search for
- Structures: Swiss-model
- Domains: InterPro

isocitrate dehydrogenase 2 (NADP^{+}), mitochondrial

Identifiers
- Symbol: IDH2
- NCBI gene: 3418
- HGNC: 5383
- OMIM: 147650
- RefSeq: NM_002168
- UniProt: P48735

Other data
- EC number: 1.1.1.42
- Locus: Chr. 15 q21-qter
Search for
- Structures: Swiss-model
- Domains: InterPro

=== NAD^{+} dependent ===
The isocitrate dehydrogenase 3 isozyme is a heterotetramer that is composed of two alpha subunits, one beta subunit, and one gamma subunit:

isocitrate dehydrogenase 3 (NAD^{+}) alpha

Identifiers
- Symbol: IDH3A
- NCBI gene: 3419
- HGNC: 5384
- OMIM: 601149
- RefSeq: NM_005530
- UniProt: P50213

Other data
- EC number: 1.1.1.41
- Locus: Chr. 15 q25.1-25.2
Search for
- Structures: Swiss-model
- Domains: InterPro

isocitrate dehydrogenase 3 (NAD^{+}) beta

Identifiers
- Symbol: IDH3B
- NCBI gene: 3420
- HGNC: 5385
- OMIM: 604526
- RefSeq: NM_174855
- UniProt: O43837

Other data
- EC number: 1.1.1.41
- Locus: Chr. 20 p13
Search for
- Structures: Swiss-model
- Domains: InterPro

isocitrate dehydrogenase 3 (NAD^{+}) gamma

Identifiers
- Symbol: IDH3G
- NCBI gene: 3421
- HGNC: 5386
- OMIM: 300089
- RefSeq: NM_174869
- UniProt: P51553

Other data
- EC number: 1.1.1.41
- Locus: Chr. X q28
Search for
- Structures: Swiss-model
- Domains: InterPro

== See also ==
- Oxidoreductase
- Myelodysplastic syndrome#IDH1 and IDH2 mutations
- Oncometabolism
- Isocitrate/isopropylmalate dehydrogenase family
