= 2,5-dioxovalerate dehydrogenase =

Class of enzymes

Identifiers
- EC no.: 1.2.1.26
- CAS no.: 37250-92-3

Databases
- IntEnz: IntEnz view
- BRENDA: BRENDA entry
- ExPASy: NiceZyme view
- KEGG: KEGG entry
- MetaCyc: metabolic pathway
- PRIAM: profile
- PDB structures: RCSB PDB PDBe PDBsum
- Gene Ontology: AmiGO / QuickGO
Search
- PMC: articles
- PubMed: articles
- NCBI: proteins

In enzymology, a 2,5-dioxovalerate dehydrogenase (EC 1.2.1.26) is an enzyme that catalyzes the chemical reaction

2,5-Dioxopentanoic acid
+ NADP^{+}
H_{2}O
H^{+}
H_{2}O
H^{+}
α-Ketoglutaric acid
+ NADPH

The three substrates of this enzyme are 2,5-dioxovalerate (2,5-dioxopentanoic acid), oxidised nicotinamide adenine dinucleotide phosphate (NADP^{+}), and water. Its products are α-ketoglutaric acid, reduced NADPH, and a proton.

This enzyme belongs to the family of oxidoreductases, specifically those acting on the aldehyde or oxo group of donor with NAD+ or NADP+ as acceptor. The systematic name of this enzyme class is 2,5-dioxopentanoate:NADP+ 5-oxidoreductase. Other names in common use include 2-oxoglutarate semialdehyde dehydrogenase, and alpha-ketoglutaric semialdehyde dehydrogenase. This enzyme participates in ascorbate and aldarate metabolism.
