= 1-Deoxypentalenic acid 11beta-hydroxylase =

Class of enzymes

1-deoxypentalenic acid 11beta-hydroxylase

Identifiers
- EC no.: 1.14.11.35

Databases
- IntEnz: IntEnz view
- BRENDA: BRENDA entry
- ExPASy: NiceZyme view
- KEGG: KEGG entry
- MetaCyc: metabolic pathway
- PRIAM: profile
- PDB structures: RCSB PDB PDBe PDBsum
Search
- PMC: articles
- PubMed: articles
- NCBI: proteins

1-deoxypentalenic acid 11beta-hydroxylase (EC 1.14.11.35, PTLH (gene), SAV2991 (gene), PNTH (gene)) is an enzyme with systematic name 1-deoxypentalenic acid,2-oxoglutarate:oxygen oxidoreductase. This enzyme catalyses the following chemical reaction

1-deoxypentalenate + 2-oxoglutarate + O_{2} $\rightleftharpoons$ 1-deoxy-11beta-hydroxypentalenate + succinate + CO_{2}

1-Deoxypentalenic acid 11beta-hydroxylase contains Fe(II) and ascorbate.
