= Isocitrate O-dihydroxycinnamoyltransferase =

isocitrate O-dihydroxycinnamoyltransferase

Identifiers
- EC no.: 2.3.1.126
- CAS no.: 112352-88-2

Databases
- IntEnz: IntEnz view
- BRENDA: BRENDA entry
- ExPASy: NiceZyme view
- KEGG: KEGG entry
- MetaCyc: metabolic pathway
- PRIAM: profile
- PDB structures: RCSB PDB PDBe PDBsum
- Gene Ontology: AmiGO / QuickGO
Search
- PMC: articles
- PubMed: articles
- NCBI: proteins

In enzymology, an isocitrate O-dihydroxycinnamoyltransferase (EC 2.3.1.126) is an enzyme that catalyzes the chemical reaction

caffeoyl-CoA + isocitrate $\rightleftharpoons$ CoA + 2-caffeoylisocitrate

Thus, the two substrates of this enzyme are caffeoyl-CoA and isocitrate, whereas its two products are CoA and 2-caffeoylisocitrate.

This enzyme belongs to the family of transferases, specifically those acyltransferases transferring groups other than aminoacyl groups. The systematic name of this enzyme class is caffeoyl-CoA:isocitrate 3-O-(3,4-dihydroxycinnamoyl)transferase.
