= Gibberellin-44 dioxygenase =

gibberellin-44 dioxygenase

Identifiers
- EC no.: 1.14.11.12
- CAS no.: 112198-85-3

Databases
- IntEnz: IntEnz view
- BRENDA: BRENDA entry
- ExPASy: NiceZyme view
- KEGG: KEGG entry
- MetaCyc: metabolic pathway
- PRIAM: profile
- PDB structures: RCSB PDB PDBe PDBsum
- Gene Ontology: AmiGO / QuickGO
Search
- PMC: articles
- PubMed: articles
- NCBI: proteins

In enzymology, a gibberellin-44 dioxygenase (EC 1.14.11.12) is an enzyme that catalyzes the chemical reaction

gibberellin 44 + 2-oxoglutarate + O_{2} $\rightleftharpoons$ gibberellin 19 + succinate + CO_{2}

The 3 substrates of this enzyme are gibberellin 44, 2-oxoglutarate, and O_{2}, whereas its 3 products are gibberellin 19, succinate, and CO_{2}.

This enzyme belongs to the family of oxidoreductases, specifically those acting on paired donors, with O2 as oxidant and incorporation or reduction of oxygen. The oxygen incorporated need not be derived from O2 with 2-oxoglutarate as one donor, and incorporation of one atom o oxygen into each donor. The systematic name of this enzyme class is (gibberellin-44),2-oxoglutarate:oxygen oxidoreductase. Other names in common use include oxygenase, gibberellin A44 oxidase, and (gibberellin-44), 2-oxoglutarate:oxygen oxidoreductase. This enzyme participates in diterpenoid biosynthesis. It employs one cofactor, iron.
