= C6H8O7 =

The molecular formula C_{6}H_{8}O_{7} (molar mass: 192.12 g/mol, exact mass: 192.0270 u) may refer to:

- Citric acid
- Isocitric acid
