= 2-oxoglutaramate amidase =

Class of enzymes

Identifiers
- EC no.: 3.5.1.111

Databases
- BRENDA: enzyme data
- ExPASy: NiceZyme view
- KEGG: enzyme entry
- MetaCyc: metabolic pathway
- Rhea: reactions
- PDB structures: RCSB PDB PDBe PDBsum
Search
- PMC: articles
- PubMed: articles
- NCBI: proteins

2-oxoglutaramate amidase (EC 3.5.1.111, omega-amidase) is an enzyme characterised from bacteria with systematic name 5-amino-2,5-dioxopentanoate amidohydrolase. It catalyses the hydrolysis of 2-oxoglutaramic acid to α-ketoglutaric acid and ammonia:

2-oxoglutaramic acid
H_{2}O
NH_{3}
α-ketoglutaric acid

The enzyme is part of the nicotine degradation pathway.
