= Citrate synthase =

Enzyme found in humans

CS
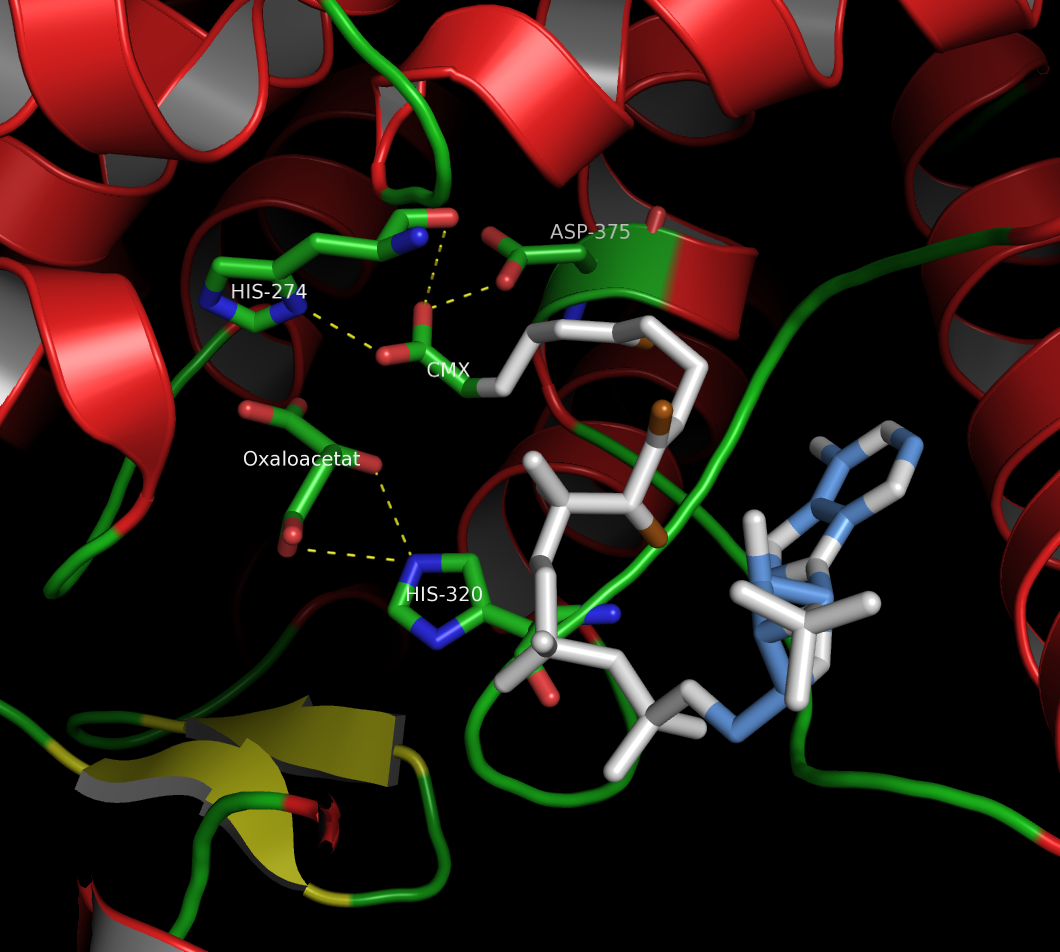

Identifiers
- Aliases: CS, citrate synthase
- External IDs: OMIM: 118950; MGI: 88529; GeneCards: CS
Enzyme activity
EC #	BRENDA	ExPASy	KEGG	MetaCyc
2.3.3.1	↗	↗	↗	↗

Gene location (Human)
Chr.	Chromosome 12 (human)
Band	12q13.3	Start	56,271,699 bp
Band	12q13.3	End	56,300,391 bp

Gene location (Mouse)
Chr.	Chromosome 10 (mouse)
Band	10|10 D3	Start	128,173,603 bp
Band	10|10 D3	End	128,198,348 bp
RNA expression pattern
Bgee	Human / Mouse (ortholog); Top expressed in: myocardium of left ventricle; cardiac muscle tissue of right atrium; right ventricle; gastrocnemius muscle; vastus lateralis muscle; body of tongue; thoracic diaphragm; muscle of thigh; triceps brachii muscle; skeletal muscle tissue / Top expressed in: Paneth cell; atrioventricular valve; brown adipose tissue; vastus lateralis muscle; right ventricle; endocardial cushion; tunica adventitia of aorta; myocardium of ventricle; hair follicle; left colon; More reference expression data
BioGPS	n/a
Gene ontology
Molecular function	transferase activity; acyltransferase, acyl groups converted into alkyl on transfer; citrate (Si)-synthase activity; RNA binding
Cellular component	mitochondrial matrix; extracellular exosome; mitochondrion; nucleus
Biological process	citrate metabolic process; tricarboxylic acid cycle; carbohydrate metabolic process; metabolism
Sources:Amigo / QuickGO
Orthologs
Databases	NCBI: entry; OMA: entry
Species	Human	Mouse
Entrez	1431	12974
Ensembl	ENSG00000062485	ENSMUSG00000005683
UniProt	O75390	Q9CZU6
RefSeq (mRNA)	NM_198324; NM_004077	NM_026444
RefSeq (protein)	NP_004068	NP_080720
Location (UCSC)	Chr 12: 56.27 – 56.3 Mb	Chr 10: 128.17 – 128.2 Mb
PubMed search
- Wikidata
View/Edit Human	View/Edit Mouse

Citrate synthase (E.C. 2.3.3.1 (previously 4.1.3.7)) is an enzyme that exists in nearly all living cells. It functions as a pace-making enzyme in the first step of the citric acid cycle (or Krebs cycle). Citrate synthase is located within eukaryotic cells in the mitochondrial matrix, but is encoded by nuclear DNA rather than mitochondrial. It is synthesized using cytoplasmic ribosomes, then transported into the mitochondrial matrix.

Citrate synthase is commonly used as a quantitative enzyme marker for the presence of intact mitochondria. Maximal activity of citrate synthase indicates the mitochondrial content of skeletal muscle. The maximal activity can be increased by endurance training or high-intensity interval training, with high-intensity interval training having the greater effect.

Citrate synthase catalyzes the condensation reaction of the two-carbon acetyl group from acetyl coenzyme A and a molecule of four-carbon oxaloacetate to form the six-carbon citrate:

acetyl-CoA
+
oxaloacetic acid
H_{2}O
citric acid
+ CoA-SH

Oxaloacetate is regenerated after the completion of one round of the Krebs cycle.

Oxaloacetate is the first substrate to bind to the enzyme. This induces the enzyme to change its conformation, and creates a binding site for the acetyl-CoA. Only when this citryl-CoA has formed will another conformational change cause thioester hydrolysis and release coenzyme A. This ensures that the energy released from the thioester bond cleavage will drive the condensation.

== Structure ==
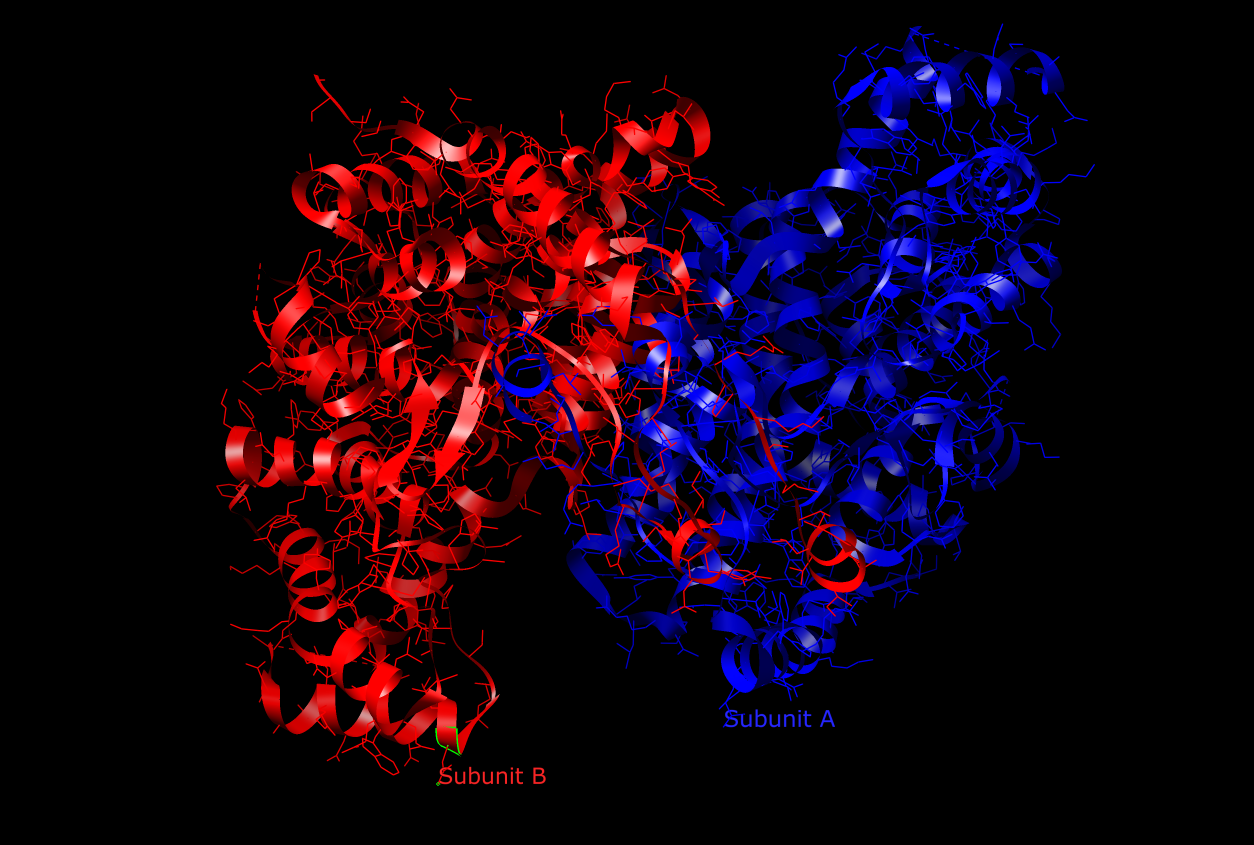
The Active Site of Citrate Synthase (open form)

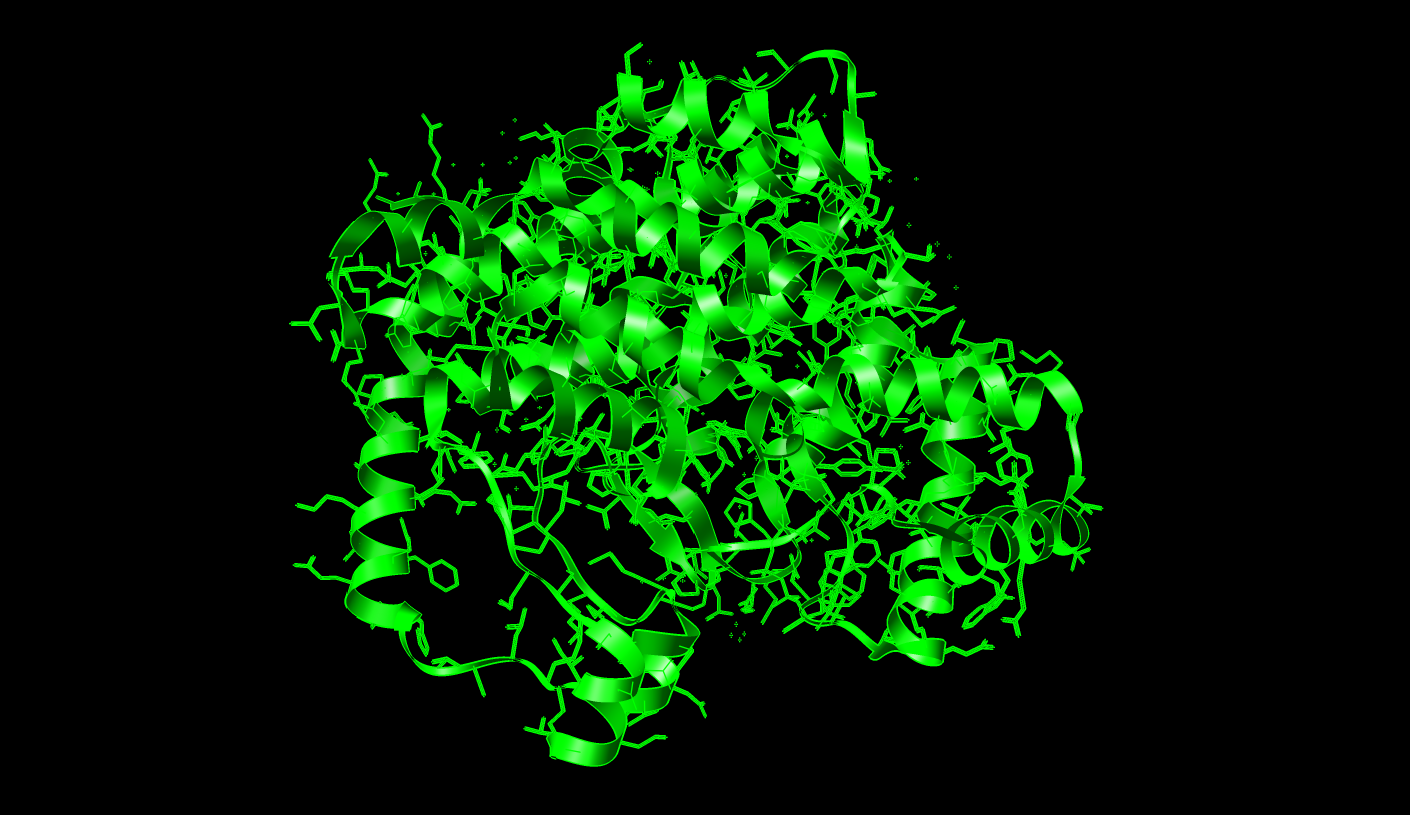
The Active Site of Citrate Synthase (closed form)

Citrate synthase's 437 amino acid residues are organized into two main subunits, each consisting of 20 alpha-helices. These alpha helices compose approximately 75% of citrate synthase's tertiary structure, while the remaining residues mainly compose irregular extensions of the structure, save a single beta-sheet of 13 residues. Between these two subunits, a single cleft exists containing the active site. Two binding sites can be found therein: one reserved for citrate or oxaloacetate and the other for Coenzyme A. The active site contains three key residues: His274, His320, and Asp375 that are highly selective in their interactions with substrates. The adjacent images display the tertiary structure of citrate synthase in its opened and closed form. The enzyme changes from opened to closed with the addition of one of its substrates (such as oxaloacetate).

== Function ==
Citrate (Si)-synthase

Identifiers
- EC no.: 2.3.3.1
- CAS no.: 9027-96-7

Databases
- BRENDA: enzyme data
- ExPASy: NiceZyme view
- KEGG: enzyme entry
- MetaCyc: metabolic pathway
- Rhea: reactions
- PDB structures: RCSB PDB PDBe PDBsum
- Gene Ontology: AmiGO / QuickGO
Search
- PMC: articles
- PubMed: articles
- NCBI: proteins

=== Mechanism ===
Citrate synthase has three key amino acids in its active site (known as the catalytic triad) which catalyze the conversion of acetyl-CoA [H_{3}CC(=O)−SCoA] and oxaloacetate [^{−}O_{2}CCH_{2}C(=O)CO_{2}^{−}] into citrate [^{−}O_{2}CCH_{2}C(OH)(CO_{2}^{−})CH_{2}CO_{2}^{−}] and H−SCoA in an aldol condensation reaction. The citrate product is said to be prochiral. This conversion begins with the negatively charged carboxylate side chain oxygen atom of Asp-375 deprotonating acetyl CoA's alpha carbon atom to form an enolate anion which in turn is neutralized by protonation by His-274 to form an enol intermediate [H_{2}C=C(OH)−SCoA]. At this point, the epsilon nitrogen lone pair of electrons on His-274 formed in the last step abstracts the hydroxyl enol proton to reform an enolate anion that initiates a nucleophilic attack on the oxaloacetate's carbonyl carbon [^{−}O_{2}CCH_{2}C(=O)CO_{2}^{−}] which in turn deprotonate the epsilon nitrogen atom of His-320. This nucleophilic addition results in the formation of citroyl−CoA [^{−}O_{2}CCH_{2}CH(CO_{2}^{−})CH_{2}C(=O)−SCoA]. At this point, a water molecule is deprotonated by the epsilon nitrogen atom of His-320 and hydrolysis is initiated. One of the oxygen's lone pairs nucleophilically attacks the carbonyl carbon of citroyl−CoA. This forms a tetrahedral intermediate and results in the ejection of −SCoA as the carbonyl reforms. The −SCoA is protonated to form HSCoA. Finally, the hydroxyl added to the carbonyl in the previous step is deprotonated and citrate [^{−}O_{2}CCH_{2}C(OH)(CO_{2}^{−})CH_{2}CO_{2}^{−}] is formed.

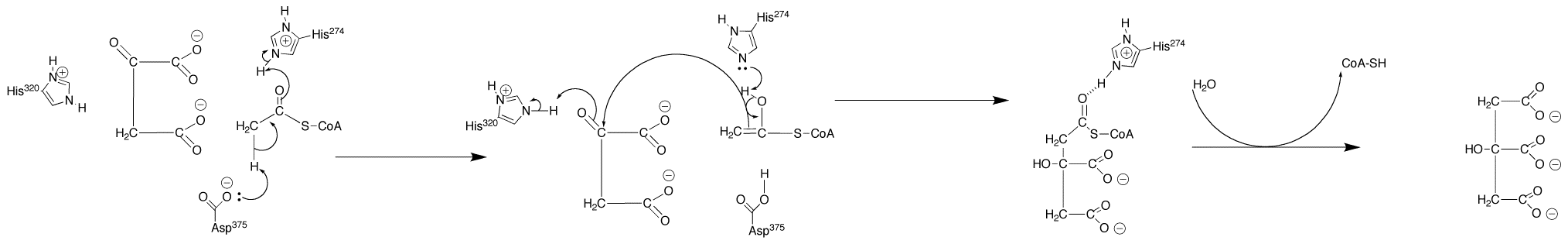
Mechanism for citrate synthase (including residues involved)

=== Inhibition ===
The enzyme is inhibited by high ratios of ATP:ADP and NADH:NAD, as high concentrations of ATP and NADH show that the energy supply is high for the cell. It is also inhibited by succinyl-CoA and propionyl-CoA, which resembles Acetyl-coA and acts as a competitive inhibitor to acetyl-CoA and a noncompetitive inhibitor to oxaloacetate. Citrate inhibits the reaction and is an example of product inhibition. The inhibition of citrate synthase by acetyl-CoA analogues has also been well documented and has been used to prove the existence of a single active site. These experiments have revealed that this single site alternates between two forms, which participate in ligase and hydrolase activity respectively. This protein may use the morpheein model of allosteric regulation.
