= Trans-2-enoyl-CoA reductase (NADPH) =

Class of enzymes

trans-2-enoyl-CoA reductase (NADPH)

Identifiers
- EC no.: 1.3.1.38
- CAS no.: 77649-64-0

Databases
- IntEnz: IntEnz view
- BRENDA: BRENDA entry
- ExPASy: NiceZyme view
- KEGG: KEGG entry
- MetaCyc: metabolic pathway
- PRIAM: profile
- PDB structures: RCSB PDB PDBe PDBsum
- Gene Ontology: AmiGO / QuickGO
Search
- PMC: articles
- PubMed: articles
- NCBI: proteins

In enzymology, a trans-2-enoyl-CoA reductase (NADPH) (EC 1.3.1.38) is an enzyme that catalyzes the chemical reaction

trans-2,3-dehydroacyl-CoA + NADPH + H^{+} $\rightleftharpoons$ acyl-CoA + NADP^{+}

Thus, the three substrates of this enzyme are trans-2,3-dehydroacyl-CoA, NADPH, and H^{+}, whereas its two products are acyl-CoA and NADP^{+}.

This enzyme belongs to the family of oxidoreductases, specifically those acting on the CH-CH group of donor with NAD+ or NADP+ as acceptor. The systematic name of this enzyme class is acyl-CoA:NADP+ trans-2-oxidoreductase. Other names in common use include NADPH-dependent trans-2-enoyl-CoA reductase, reductase, trans-enoyl coenzyme A, and trans-2-enoyl-CoA reductase (NADPH). This enzyme participates in fatty acid elongation in mitochondria and polyunsaturated fatty acid biosynthesis.
