= Isocitric acid =

Names
- IUPAC name 1-Hydroxypropane-1,2,3-tricarboxylic acid

Identifiers
CAS Number	320-77-4
3D model (JSmol)	Interactive image
ChEBI	CHEBI:30887
ChEMBL	ChEMBL539669
ChemSpider	1161
DrugBank	DB01727 °
ECHA InfoCard	100.005.713
KEGG	C00311
MeSH	Isocitrate
PubChem CID	1198
UNII	9RW6G5D4MQ
CompTox Dashboard (EPA)	DTXSID60861871
- InChI: InChI=1S/C6H8O7/c7-3(8)1-2(5(10)11)4(9)6(12)13/h2,4,9H,1H2,(H,7,8)(H,10,11)(H,12,13) Key: ODBLHEXUDAPZAU-UHFFFAOYSA-N; InChI=1/C6H8O7/c7-3(8)1-2(5(10)11)4(9)6(12)13/h2,4,9H,1H2,(H,7,8)(H,10,11)(H,12,13) Key: ODBLHEXUDAPZAU-UHFFFAOYAX
- SMILES: O=C(O)C(CC(=O)O)C(O)C(=O)O

Properties
Chemical formula	C_{6}H_{8}O_{7}
Molar mass	192.124
Melting point	105 °C (221 °F; 378 K)
- Except where otherwise noted, data are given for materials in their standard state (at 25 °C [77 °F], 100 kPa). verify (what is ?) Infobox references

Isocitric acid is a structural isomer of citric acid and consequently shares similar physical and chemical properties. This makes it difficult to separate the two isomers. Isocitric acid can form salts and esters known as isocitrates. Its anion form is an intermediate in the citric acid cycle.

Isocitric acid is commonly used as a marker to detect the authenticity and quality of fruit products, most often citrus juices. In authentic orange juice, for example, the ratio of citric acid to D-isocitric acid is usually less than 130. An isocitric acid value higher than this may be indicative of fruit juice adulteration.

Isocitric acid has largely been used as a biochemical agent due to limited amounts. However, isocitric acid has been shown to have pharmaceutical and therapeutic effects. Isocitric acid has been shown to effectively treat iron deficient anemia. Additionally, isocitric acid could be used to treat Parkinson's disease. Yarrowia lipolytica can be used to produce isocitric acid and is inexpensive compared to other methods. Furthermore, other methods produce unequal amounts of citric acid to isocitric acid ratio, mostly producing citric acid. Use of Yarrowia lipolytica produces a better yield, making equal amounts of citric acid to isocitric acid.

== Interactive pathway map ==
Click on genes, proteins and metabolites below to link to respective articles. (Note: The interactive pathway map can be edited at WikiPathways: "TCACycle_WP78".)

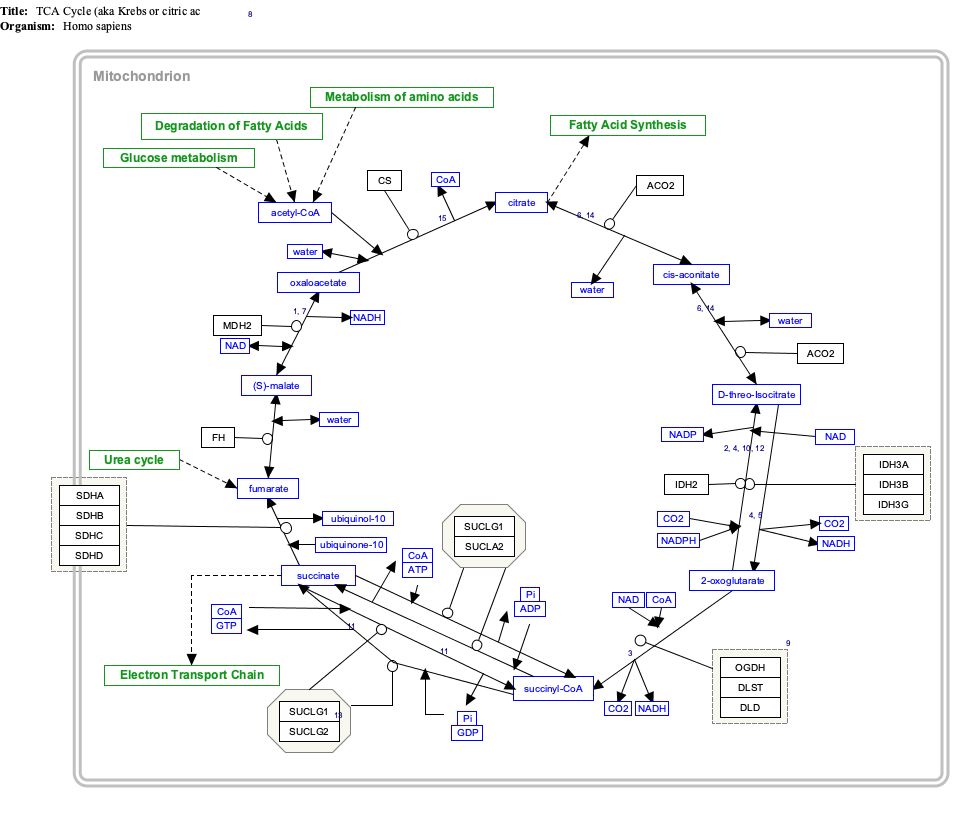

TCACycle_WP78 edit

== Biochemistry ==
=== Citric Acid Cycle ===
Isocitrate is the intermediate in the citric acid cycle between citrate and α-ketoglutarate. Citrate covalently interacts with the iron-sulfur core of aconitase. The enzyme's core also controls the reversible addition or removal of H_{2}O from the molecule. In the transition between citrate and isocitrate, H_{2}O is temporarily added to the substrate to create the intermediate molecule, cis-aconitate. The intermediate can exist as aconitic acid, but in the citric acid cycle, it does not dissociate from the enzyme and proceeds directly to the next structure when H_{2}O is removed from the molecule. Although the ΔG′°=13.3 kJ/mol, an unfavorable value, the isocitrate concentration is constantly lowered by its transformation into α-ketoglutarate. The transformation between isocitrate and α-ketoglutarate has an intermediate, the enol, oxalosuccinate and is catalyzed by isocitrate dehydrogenase. The enzyme contains an Mn^{2+} which stabilizes and interacts with the intermediate. After isocitrate is oxidized into oxalosuccinate, it is decarboxylated and rearranged into α-ketoglutarate and continues in the citric acid cycle.

== See also ==
- Citric acid, also fluorocitric acid and chlorocitric acid
- Tartaric acid
- Malic acid
