= Α-Ketoglutaric acid =

α-Ketoglutaric acid
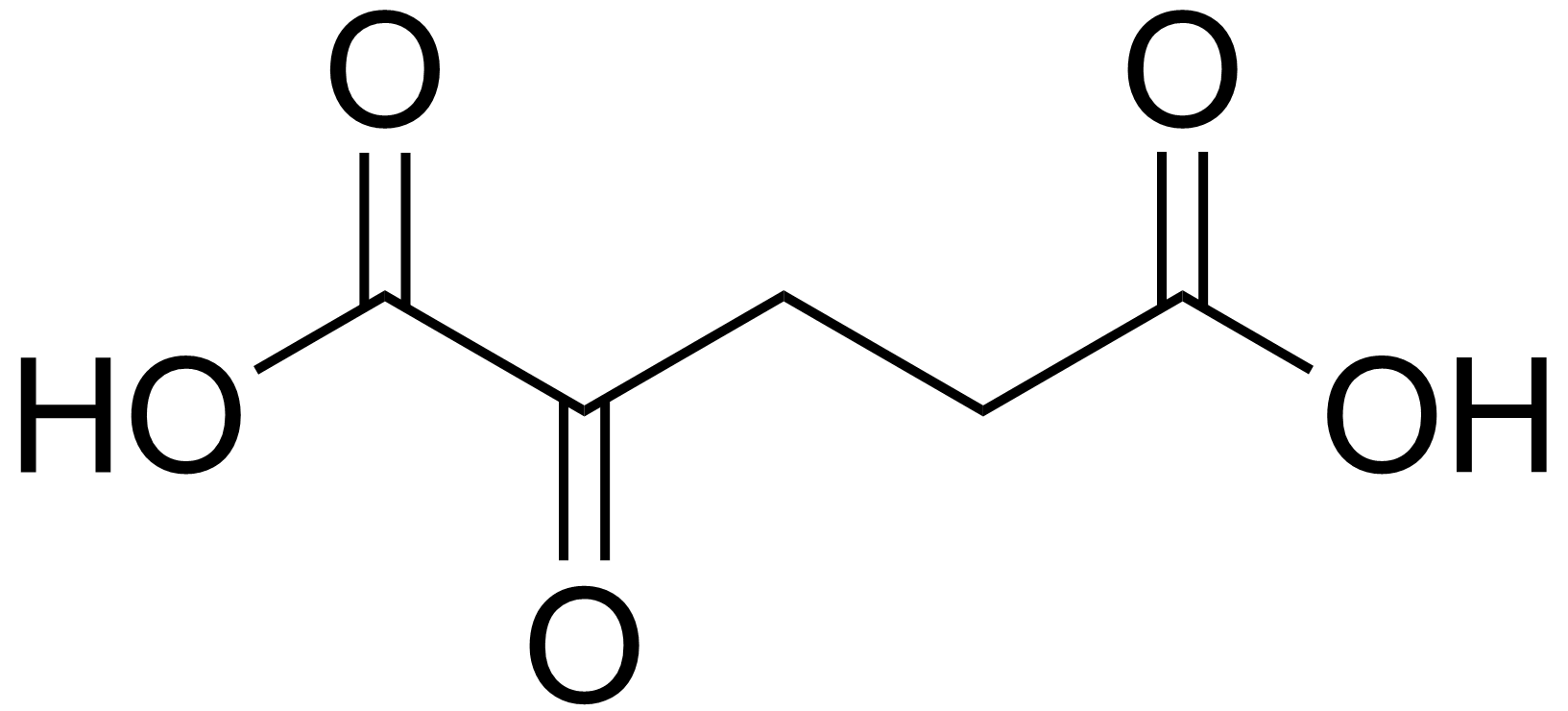

Names
- Preferred IUPAC name 2-Oxopentanedioic acid
- Other names 2-Ketoglutaric acid alpha-Ketoglutaric acid 2-Oxoglutaric acid Oxoglutaric acid Oxogluric acid

Identifiers
CAS Number	328-50-7
3D model (JSmol)	Interactive image
ChEBI	CHEBI:30915
ChemSpider	50
DrugBank	DB02926
ECHA InfoCard	100.005.756
IUPHAR/BPS	3636
KEGG	C00026
MeSH	alpha-ketoglutaric+acid
PubChem CID	51
UNII	8ID597Z82X
CompTox Dashboard (EPA)	DTXSID5033179
- InChI: InChI=1S/C5H6O5/c6-3(5(9)10)1-2-4(7)8/h1-2H2,(H,7,8)(H,9,10) Key: KPGXRSRHYNQIFN-UHFFFAOYSA-N; InChI=1/C5H6O5/c6-3(5(9)10)1-2-4(7)8/h1-2H2,(H,7,8)(H,9,10) Key: KPGXRSRHYNQIFN-UHFFFAOYAN
- SMILES: O=C(O)C(=O)CCC(=O)O

Properties
Chemical formula	C_{5}H_{6}O_{5}
Molar mass	146.098 g·mol^{−1}
Melting point	115 °C (239 °F; 388 K)
- Except where otherwise noted, data are given for materials in their standard state (at 25 °C [77 °F], 100 kPa). verify (what is ?) Infobox references

α-Ketoglutaric acid (AKG) is an organic compound with the formula HO_{2}CCO(CH_{2})_{2}CO_{2}H. A white, nontoxic solid, it is a common dicarboxylic acid. Relevant to its biological roles, it exists in water as its conjugate base α-ketoglutarate. It is also classified as a 2-ketocarboxylic acid. β-Ketoglutaric acid is an isomer. "Ketoglutaric acid" and "ketoglutarate", when not qualified as α or β, almost always refers respectively to α-ketoglutaric acid or α-ketoglutarate.

α-Ketoglutarate is an intermediate in the citric acid cycle, a set of cyclic reactions that supplies energy to cells. It is also an intermediate in or product of several other metabolic pathways. These include its being a component of metabolic pathways that: make amino acids and in the process regulate the cellular levels of carbon, nitrogen, and ammonia; reduce the cellular levels of potentially toxic reactive oxygen species; and synthesize the neurotransmitter γ-aminobutyric acid (GABA).

A large body of preclinical (i.e., conducted in animal models of disease or on animal or human tissues) research has been conducted on the role of endogenous (generated within the body) α-ketoglutarate. A small amount of preclinical research has been done to determine the effects of providing additional exogenous α-ketoglutarate to biological systems. There is currently no randomized controlled trials showing α-ketoglutarate to have any pharmacological (drug-like) effects on humans. The Food and Drug Administration classifies α-ketoglutaric acid as "503A Category 3: Bulk Drug Substances Nominated Without Adequate Support".

== Production ==
=== Citric acid cycle ===
α-Ketoglutarate is a component of the citric acid cycle, a cyclical metabolic pathway located in the mitochondria. This cycle supplies the energy that cells need by sequentially metabolizing (indicated by →) citrate through seven intermediate metabolites and then converting the eighth intermediate metabolite, oxaloacetate, back to citrate:

citrate → cis-aconitate → isocitrate → α-ketoglutarate → succinyl-CoA → succinate → fumarate → malate → oxaloacetate → citrate

In this cycle, the enzyme isocitrate dehydrogenase 3 converts isocitrate (isocitrate has 4 isomers of which only the (−)-d-threo-isomer is the naturally occurring isomer in the citric acid cycle.) to α-ketoglutarate which in the next step is converted to succinyl-CoA by the oxoglutarate dehydrogenase complex of enzymes.

=== Glutaminolysis and transamination ===
Aside from the citric acid cycle, α-ketoglutarate is made by glutaminolysis in which the enzyme glutaminase removes the amino group from glutamine to form glutamate which is converted to α-ketoglutarate by any one of three enzymes, glutamate dehydrogenase, alanine transaminase, or aspartate transaminase (see The glutaminolytic pathways).

It is also made through the action of pyridoxal phosphate-dependent enzymes (alanine transaminase) in which glutamate is converted to α-Ketoglutarate by "donating" its −NH_{2} to other compounds (see transamination).

These reactions are reversible. In the reverse direction of these reactions, α-ketoglutarate contributes to the production of amino acids such as glutamine, proline, arginine, and lysine as well as the lowering of cellular carbon and nitrogen (i.e., N) levels; this prevents excessive levels of these two potentially toxic elements from accumulating in cells and tissues.

The neurotoxin, ammonia (i.e., NH_{3}), is also prevented from accumulating in tissues. In this metabolic pathway the −NH_{2} group on an amino acid is transferred to α-ketoglutarate; this forms the α-keto acid of the original amino acid and the amine-containing product of α-ketoglutarate, glutamate. The cellular glutamate passes into the circulation and is taken up by the liver where it delivers its acquired −NH_{2} group to the urea cycle. In effect, the latter pathway removes excess ammonia from the body in the form of urinary urea.

== Functions ==
α-Ketoglutaric acid exerts its biological action in multiple ways. It is an agonist of the OXGR1 receptor. It is also a cellular antioxidant and a cofactor for certain enzymes.

=== OXGR1 receptor-dependent bioactions ===
OXGR1 (also known as GPR99) is a G protein-coupled receptor, i.e., a receptor located on the surface membrane of cells that binds certain ligands and is thereby stimulated to activate G proteins that elicit pre-programmed responses in their parent cells. OXGR1 was identified as a receptor for: a) α-ketoglutarate in 2004; b) three leukotrienes viz., leukotrienes E4, C4, and D4 in 2013. and c) itaconate in 2023. These ligands have the following relative potencies in stimulating responses in OXGR1-bearing cells (Note that LTE4 can stimulate OXGR1 at concentrations far lower than those of the other four ligands):

LTE4 >> LTC4 = LTD4 > α-ketoglutarate = itaconate.

It may be difficult to determine if an OXGR1-stimulating agent elicits a functional response by activating OXGR1 as opposed to some other mechanism. To make this distinction, studies have shown that the action of an OXGR1-activating agent on cultured cells, cultured tissues, or animals does not occur or is reduced when these cells, tissues, or animals have been altered so that they do not express or express greatly reduced levels of the OXGR1 protein, or when their actions are inhibited by an OXGR1 receptor antagonists. OXGR1 is inhibited by montelukast, a well-known inhibitor of the cysteinyl leukotriene receptor 1, i.e., the receptor for LTD4, LTC4, and LTE4. Montelukast also blocks the binding of these leukotrienes to, and thereby inhibits their activation of, OXGR1. One study presented evidence suggesting that α-ketoglutarate binds to OXGR1. It is assumed that montelukast similarly blocks α-ketoglutarate's binding to, and thereby inhibits its activation of OXGR1.

==== Kidney functions ====
The pendrin protein promotes the electroneutral exchange of tissue chloride (Cl^{−}) for urinary bicarbonate (HCO_{3}^{−}) in the apical surfaces (i.e., surfaces facing the urine) of the kidney's renal β-intercalated cells (also termed type B intercalated cells) and non-α non-β intercalated cells (also termed non-A non-B intercalated cells) in the kidney's collecting duct system (i.e., CDS). A study in mice found that OXGR1 colocalizes with pendrin in the β-intercalated cells and non-α non-β intercalated cells lining the tubules of their kidney's CDS. The intercalated cells in the CDS tubules isolated from mice used pendrin in cooperation with the electroneutral sodium bicarbonate exchanger 1 protein to mediate the Cl^{−} for HCO_{3}^{−} exchange. α-Ketoglutarate stimulated the rate of this exchange in CDS tubules isolated from control mice (i.e., mice that had the Oxgr1 gene and protein) but not in CDS tubules isolated from Oxgr1 gene knockout mice (i.e., mice that lacked the Oxgr1 gene and protein). This study also showed that the α-ketoglutarate in the blood of mice filtered through their kidney's glomeruli into the proximal tubules and loops of Henle where it was reabsorbed. Mice drinking water with a basic pH (i.e., >7) due to the addition of sodium bicarbonate and mice lacking the Oxgr1 gene and protein who drink water without sodium bicarbonate had urines that were more basic (i.e., pH about 7.8) and contained higher levels of urinary α-ketoglutarate than control mice drinking water without this additive. Furthermore, Oxgr1 gene knockout mice drinking sodium bicarbonate-rich water developed metabolic alkalosis (body tissue pH levels higher than normal) that was associated with blood bicarbonate levels significantly higher and blood chloride levels significantly lower than those in control mice drinking the sodium bicarbonate-rich water.

Several other studies confirmed these findings and reported that cells in the proximal tubules of mice synthesize α-ketoglutarate and either broke it down thereby reducing its urine levels or secreted it into the tubules' lumens thereby increasing its urine levels.

Another study showed that a) In silico computer simulations strongly suggested that α-ketoglutarate bound to mouse OXGPR1; b) suspensions of canal duct cells isolated from the collecting ducts, loops of Henle, vasa recta, and interstitium of mouse kidneys raised their cytosolic ionic calcium, i.e., Ca^{2+} levels in response to α-ketoglutarate but this response (which is an indicator of cell activation) was blocked by pretreating the cells with montelukast; and c) compared to mice not treated with streptozotocin, streptozotocin-induced diabetic mice (an animal disease model of diabetes) urinated only a small amount of the ionic sodium (Na^{+}) that they drank or received by intravenous injections; montelukast reversed this defect in the streptozotocin-pretreated mice.

These results indicate that in mice: a) α-ketoglutarate stimulates kidney OXGR1 to activate pendrin-mediated reabsorption of sodium and chloride by type B and non-A–non-B intercalated cells; b) high alkaline (i.e., sodium bicarbonate) intake produces significant increases in urine pH and α-ketoglutarate levels and impairs secretion of bicarbonate into the CDS tubules' lumens; c) the acid–base balance (i.e., levels of acids relative to their bases) in the face of high alkali intake depends on the activation of OXGR1 by α-ketoglutarate; d) alkaline loading directly or indirectly stimulates α-ketoglutarate secretion into the kidney's proximal tubules where further down these tubules it activates OXGR1 and thereby the absorption and secretion of various agents that contribute to restoring a physiologically normal acid-base balance; and e) α-ketoglutarate stimulates OXGR1-bearing CDS cells to raise their levels of cytosolic Ca^{2+}) and in diabetic mice (and presumably other conditions involving high levels of blood and/or urine glucose) to increase these cells uptake of Na^{+}.

==== Resistance exercise and muscle atrophy ====
Resistance exercise is exercising a muscle or muscle group against external resistance (see strength training). Studies have found that: a) mice feeding on a high fat or normal diet and given the resistance exercise of repeatedly climbing up a 1 meter ladder for 40 minutes had higher levels of α-ketoglutarate in their blood and seven muscles than non-exercising mice feeding respectively on the high fat or normal diet; b) mice conducting ladder climbing for several weeks and eating a high fat diet developed lower fat tissue masses and higher lean tissue masses than non-exercising mice on this diet; c) mice not in exercise training fed α-ketoglutarate likewise developed lower fat tissue and higher lean tissue masses than α-ketoglutarate-unfed, non-exercising mice; d) OXGR1 was strongly expressed in the mouse adrenal gland inner medullas and either resistance training or oral α-ketoglutarate increased this tissue's levels of the mRNA that is responsible for the synthesis of OXGR1; e) α-ketoglutarate stimulated chromaffin cells isolated from mouse adrenal glands to release epinephrine but reduction of these cells' OXGR1 levels by small interfering RNA reduced this response; f) α-ketoglutarate increased the blood serum levels of epinephrine in mice expressing OXGR1 but not in Oxgr1 gene knockout mice (i.e., mice lacking the OXGR1 gene and protein); g) mice on the high fat diet challenged with α-ketoglutarate increased their blood serum levels of epinephrine and developed lower fat tissue masses and higher lean tissue masses but neither OXGR1 gene knockout mice nor mice that had only their adrenal glands' OXGR1 gene knocked out showed these responses; and h) OXGR1 gene knockout mice fed the high fat diet developed muscle protein degradation, muscle atrophy (i.e., wasting), and falls in body weight whereas control mice did not show these fat diet-induced changes. These findings indicate that in mice resistance exercise increases muscle production as well as serum levels of α-ketoglutarate which in turn suppresses diet-induced obesity (i.e., low body fat and high lean body masses) at least in part by stimulating the OXGR1 on adrenal gland chromaffin cells to release epinephrine.

Additional mechanisms include inhibition of hepatic gluconeogenesis via serpina1e signaling (reducing hyperglycemia) and activation of the PHD3/ADRB2 pathway in muscle cells.

Supplementation studies have shown that oral α-ketoglutarate increases serum levels of α-ketoglutarate, suppresses obesity and improves glucose tolerance in mice. See § Glucose tolerance below.

=== OXGR1 receptor-independent bioactions ===
The following actions of α-ketoglutarate have not been evaluated for their dependency on activating OXGR1 and are here assumed to be OXGR1-independent. Futures studies are needed to determine if OXGR1 contributes in whole or part to these actions of α-ketoglutarate.

==== Reactive oxygen species ====
α-Ketoglutarate is one of the non-enzymatic antioxidant agents. It reacts with hydrogen peroxide (H_{2}O_{2}) to form succinate, carbon dioxide (i.e., CO_{2}), and water (i.e., (H_{2}O) thereby lowering the levels of H_{2}O_{2}. Additionally, α-ketoglutarate increases the activity of superoxide dismutase, which converts the highly toxic (O^{−}_{2}) radical to molecular oxygen (i.e., O_{2}) and H_{2}O_{2}.

==== Formation of the neurotransmitter gamma-aminobutyric acid ====
A study conducted on the GABAergic neurons (i.e., nerve cells) in the neocortex of rat brains reported that the cytosolic form of the aspartate transaminase enzyme metabolizes α-ketoglutarate to glutamate which in turn is metabolized by glutamic acid decarboxylase to the inhibitory neurotransmitter gamma-aminobutyric acid. These metabolic reactions occur at the ends of the inhibitory axons of the GABAergic neurons and result in the release of gamma-aminobutyric acid which then inhibits the activation of nearby neurons.

==== Fe2+/α-ketoglutarate-dependent dioxygenase enzymes and TET enzymes ====
α-Ketoglutarate is a cofactor that activates histone-lysine demethylase protein superfamily. This superfamily consists of two groups, the FAD-dependent amine oxidases which do not require α-ketoglutarate for activation and the Fe2+/α-ketoglutarate-dependent dioxygenases (Fe2+ is the ferrous form of iron, i.e., Fe^{2+}). The latter group of more than 30 enzymes is classified into 7 subfamilies termed histone lysine demethylases, i.e., HDM2 to HDM7, with each subfamily having multiple members. These HDMs are characterized by containing a Jumonji C (JmjC) protein domain. They function as dioxygenases or hydroxylases to remove methyl groups from the lysine residues on the histones enveloping DNA and thereby alter the expression of diverse genes. These altered gene expressions lead to a wide range of changes in the functions of various cell types and thereby caused the development and/or progression of various cancers, pathological inflammations, and other disorders (see α-Ketoglutarate-dependent demethylase biological functions). The TET enzymes (i.e., ten-eleven translocation (TET) methylcytosine dioxygenase family of enzymes) consists of three members, TET-1, TET-2, and TET-3. Like the Fe2+/α-ketoglutarate-dependent dioxygenases, all three TET enzymes require Fe^{2+} and α-ketoglutarate as cofactors to become activated. Unlike the dioxygenases, however, they remove methyl groups from the 5-methylcytosines of DNA sites that regulate the expression of nearby genes. These demethylations have a variety of effects including, similar to the Fe2+/α-ketoglutarate-dependent dioxygenases, alteration of the development and/or progression of various cancers, immune responses, and other disorders (see functions of TET enzymes).

===== β-Ketoglutaric acid and TET-2 =====
β-Ketoglutaric acid has been detected in the saliva of individuals chewing betel quid, a complex mixture derived from betel nuts mixed with various other materials. Chronic chewing betel quid is associated with the development of certain cancers, particularly those in the oral cavity. The study showed that β-ketoglutaric acid bound to the cancer-promoting protein TET-2 thereby inhibiting α-ketoglutarate's binding to this protein. Since α-ketoglutarate's binding of TET-2 is thought to be required for it to activate TET-2, the study suggested that β-ketoglutaric acid may not fulfill the requirements for TET-2 to be activatable and therefore may prove able to block α-ketoglutarate's cancer-promoting as well as inflammation-promoting and other actions that involve its activation of TET-2.

==== Immune regulation ====
Under glutamine-deprived conditions, α-ketoglutarate promotes naïve CD4+ T cells differentiation into inflammation-promoting T_{h}1 cells while inhibiting their differentiation into inflammation-inhibiting Treg cells thereby promoting certain inflammation responses.

== Interactive pathway map ==
Click on genes, proteins and metabolites below to link to respective articles. (Note: The interactive pathway map can be edited at WikiPathways: "TCACycle_WP78".)

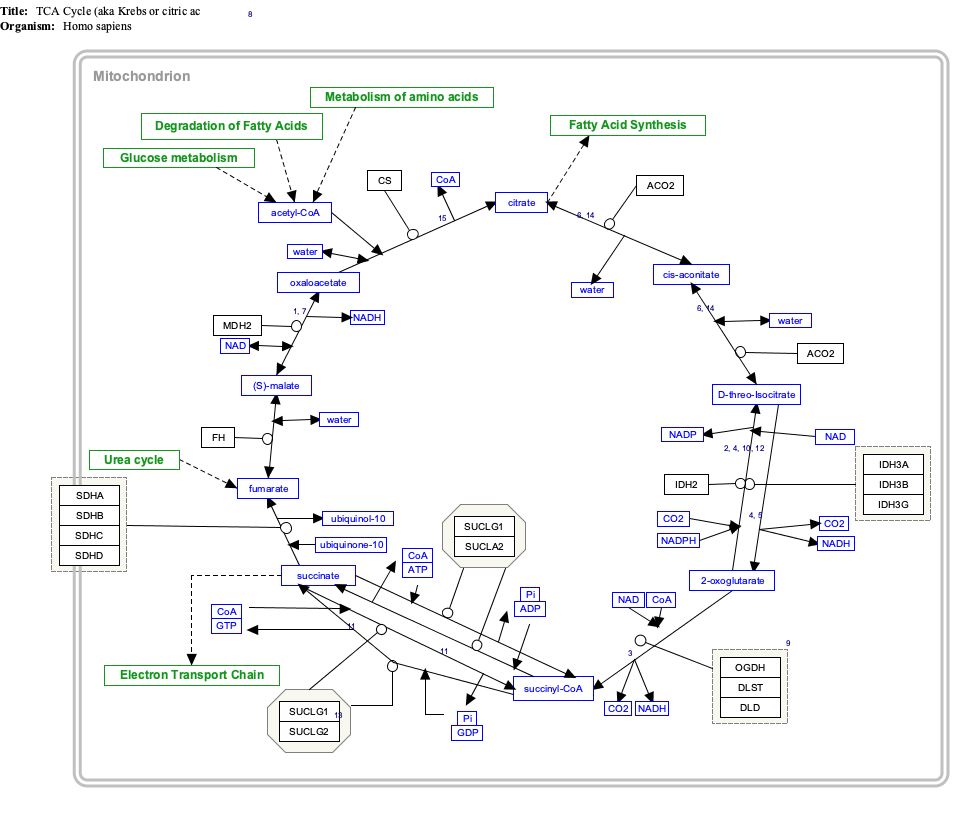

TCACycle_WP78 edit

== Supplementation ==
α-Ketoglutaric acid is naturally generated and consumed via the citric acid cycle. Nevertheless, studies that are primarily preclinical (i.e., conducted in animal models of disease or on animal or human tissues) have examined the effects of adding this molecule to biological systems in amounts beyond what is naturally present.

Middle‐aged, i.e., 10‐month‐old, mice had lower serum levels of α-ketoglutarate than 2‐month‐old mice. Oral supplementation restores blood levels of α-ketoglutarate in these mice.

=== Glucose tolerance ===
Middle aged (10‐month‐old) mice fed a high fat diet gained body weight and fat mass in the lower parts of their bodies and had impaired glucose tolerance as defined in glucose tolerance tests. Adding α-ketoglutarate to the drinking water of these mice inhibited the development of these changes. These results suggest that drinking the α-ketoglutarate-rich water replenished the otherwise diminished supplies of α-ketoglutarate in middle aged mice; the replenished supply of α-ketoglutarate thereby became available to suppress obesity and improve glucose tolerance.

A study in rats feed a low fat or high fat diet for 27 weeks and drinking α-ketoglutarate-rich water for the last 12 weeks of this 27 week period decreased their fat issue masses and increased their whole-body insulin sensitivity as defined in glucose tolerance tests. Rats fed either of these diets but not given α-ketoglutarate-rich water did not show these changes. This study indicates that α-ketoglutarate regulates body fat mass and insulin sensitivity in rats as well as mice.

=== Aging and diseases associated with aging ===
α-Ketoglutarate has been reported to increase the life span and/or delay the development of old age-related diseases in a species of roundworms and in mice. It nearly doubled the life span and delayed age-related deteriorations (e.g., decline in rapid, coordinated body movements) of Caenorhabditis elegans roundworms when added to their cell cultures. Similarly, mice fed a diet high in calcium-bound α-ketoglutarate had a longer life span and shorter length of time in which they suffered old age-related morbidities (e.g., increased frailty, hair loss, and changes in body weight). Cell cultures of splenocytes (i.e., primarily T cells) from the α-ketoglutarate-fed mice produced higher levels of the anti-inflammatory cytokine, interleukin-10, than splenocytes from mice not fed α-ketoglutarate. (Chronic low-grade inflammation which might be inhibited by interleukin-10, is associated with the development of old age-related disorders and diseases.)

As individuals age, their DNA develops additions of a methyl group (-CH_{3}) to a cytosine adjacent to a guanine (termed a CpG island) in an increasing number of CpG islands close to certain genes. These methylations often suppress the expression of the genes to which they are close. Assays (termed epigenetic clock tests) that determine the presence of methylations of cytosine in CpG islands for genes have been used to define an individual's biological age. The Rejuvant study (a human clinical trial) reported that the median and range of the biological age of females before treatment was 62.15 (range, 46.4 to 73) years and fell to 55.55 (range 33.4 to 63.7) years after an average of 7 months treatment. These values for men were 61.85 (range 41.9 to 79.7) years before and 53.3 (33 to 74.9) years after treatment. Overall, the combined group of males and females showed an average fall in biological age of 8 years compared to before treatment. The p-value for this difference was extraordinarily significant, i.e., 6.538x10-12, in showing that this treatment decreased the participants' biological ages. However, the study did not: a) include a control group (i.e., concurrent study of individuals taking a placebo instead of Rejuvant®); b) determine if the retinyl palmitate, vitamin A, and/or calcium given with α-ketoglutarate contributed to the changes in biological ages; and c) disclose which genes were tracked for the methylation of their CpG island. The study recommended that studies need to include control groups taking a placebo or the appropriate dosages of retinyl palmitate, vitamin A, and calcium. Also, TruMe Labs, who were the maker and marketer of the biological age assay used in this study, sponsored part of the study and contributed three of its employees as authors to the study.

== As a drug target ==
The oxoglutarate dehydrogenase complex (α-ketoglutarate dehydrogenase complex) is responsible for converting AKG into succinyl-CoA in the citric acid cycle. It is one of the rate-limiting enzymes in the cycle. In breast cancer with lung metasatsis models, inhibiting this enzyme (causing an accumulation of AKG) reduces cancer cell growth; a similar effect is observed with AKG supplementation in mice with B-cell lymphoma. On the other hand, a dysfunction of this enzyme (again causing AKG accumulation) leads to increased lipid peroxidation in CHCHD2-linked Parkinson's disease models and appears to be partly responsible for elevated phosphorylated α-synuclein levels, as improving the function of this complex causes both AKG and phosphorylated α-synuclei to decrease.

== See also ==
- 2OG-dependent dioxygenases
