= Arginine—pyruvate transaminase =

Arginine-pyruvate transaminase

Identifiers
- EC no.: 2.6.1.84

Databases
- IntEnz: IntEnz view
- BRENDA: BRENDA entry
- ExPASy: NiceZyme view
- KEGG: KEGG entry
- MetaCyc: metabolic pathway
- PRIAM: profile
- PDB structures: RCSB PDB PDBe PDBsum
Search
- PMC: articles
- PubMed: articles
- NCBI: proteins

Arginine-pyruvate transaminase (EC 2.6.1.84) is a pyridoxal phosphate-dependent enzyme that catalyzes the chemical reaction

arginine
+
pyruvic acid
5-guanidino-2-oxopentanoic acid
+
alanine

The two substrates of this enzyme characterised from Pseudomonas aeruginosa are L-arginine and pyruvic acid. Its products are 5-guanidino-2-oxopentanoic acid and L-alanine. In this bacterium, the reaction is the first step in a breakdown of the amino acid arginine.

This enzyme is a transferase, specifically a transaminase, which transfer nitrogenous groups. The systematic name of this enzyme class is L-arginine:pyruvate aminotransferase. Other names in common use include arginine:pyruvate transaminase, and AruH.
