= Transamination =

Chemical reaction that transfers an amino group to a ketoacid

Aminotransfer reaction between an amino acid and an alpha-keto acid

Transamination is a chemical reaction that transfers an amino group from an amino acid to an α-keto acid.

This process mainly takes place in the liver. In the liver, amino groups from different amino acids are transferred to α-ketoglutarate to form glutamate. In the mitochondria, glutamate is deaminated and toxic ammonium enters the urea cycle for excretion. Another site of transamination is the skeletal muscles. In the skeletal muscles, amino groups are transferred to pyruvate, forming alanine. Alanine carries nitrogen to the liver through the glucose–alanine cycle.

In biochemistry, the process occurs extensively during amino acid synthesis and is catalyzed by transaminases (aminotransferases), which requires the cofactor pyridoxal phosphate (PLP), and an α-keto acid as the acceptor of the amino group. α-ketoglutarate acts as the predominant amino-group acceptor and produces glutamate.

Amino acid + α-ketoglutarate ↔ α-keto acid + glutamate

Glutamate's amino group, in turn, is transferred to oxaloacetate in a second transamination reaction yielding aspartate.

Glutamate + oxaloacetate ↔ α-ketoglutarate + aspartate

== Biochemical mechanism and function of transamination ==
Transamination is responsible for the deamination of most amino acids, and one of the major degradation pathways which convert essential amino acids to non-essential amino acids (amino acids that can be synthesized de novo by the organism).

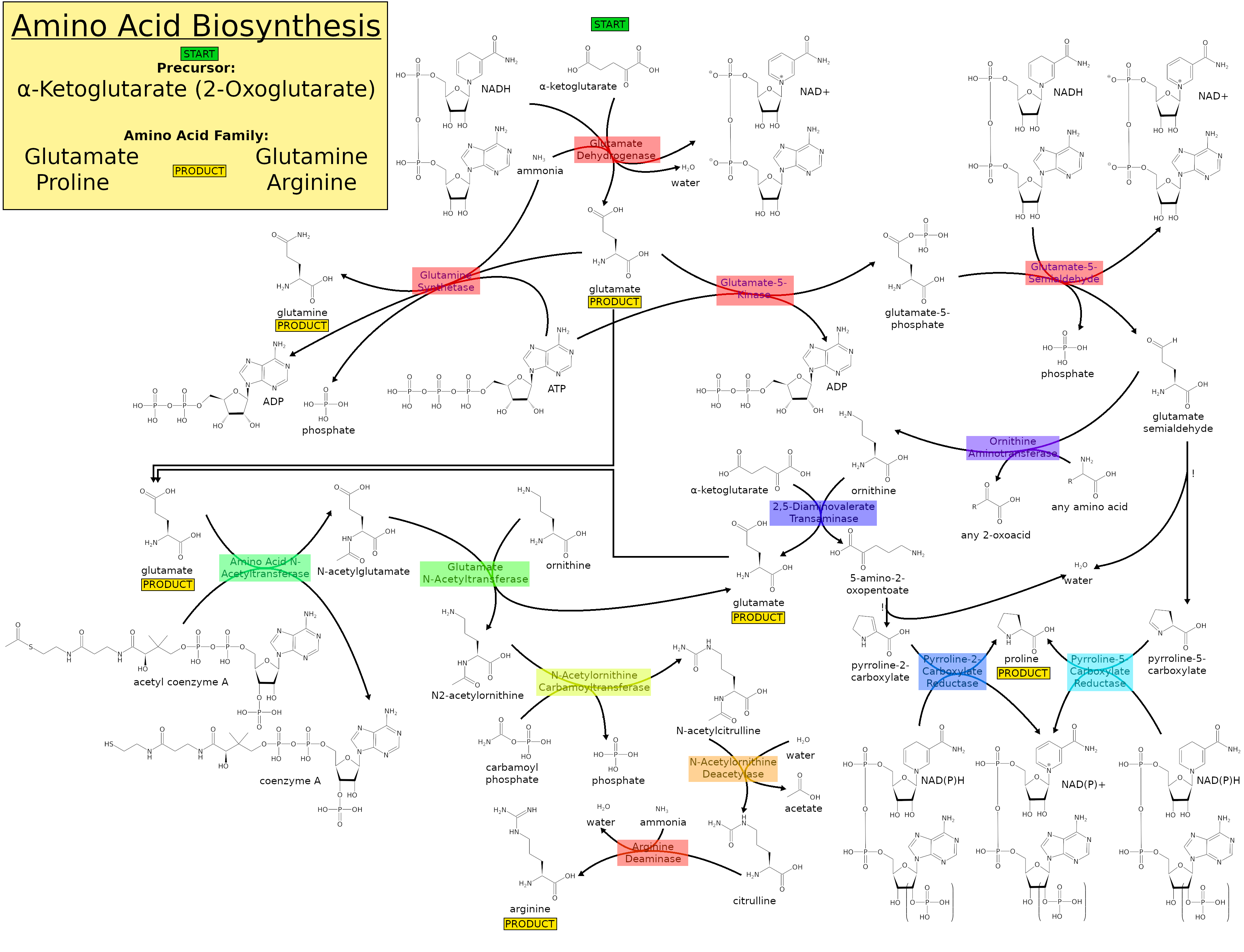
A good example of transamination reactions, this diagram shows the biosynthesis (anabolism) of amino acids glutamate, glutamine, proline, and arginine from the precursor alpha-ketoglutarate.

Transamination is mediated by several types of aminotransferase enzymes. An aminotransferase may be specific for an individual amino acid, or it may be able to process any member of a group of similar ones, for example the branched-chain amino acids, which comprises valine, isoleucine, and leucine. The two common types of aminotransferases are alanine aminotransferase (ALT) and aspartate aminotransferase (AST).

=== Mechanism of action ===
Transamination catalyzed by aminotransferase occurs in two stages. In the first step, the α amino group of an amino acid is transferred to the enzyme, producing the corresponding α-keto acid and the aminated enzyme. During the second stage, the amino group is transferred to the keto acid acceptor, forming the amino acid product while regenerating the enzyme. The chirality of an amino acid is determined during transamination. For the reaction to complete, aminotransferases require participation of aldehyde containing coenzyme, pyridoxal-5'-phosphate (PLP), a derivative of Pyridoxine (Vitamin B_{6}). The amino group is accommodated by conversion of this coenzyme to pyridoxamine-5'-phosphate (PMP). PLP is covalently attached to the enzyme via a Schiff Base linkage formed by the condensation of its aldehyde group with the ε-amino group of an enzymatic Lys residue. The Schiff base, which is conjugated to the enzyme's pyridinium ring, is the focus of the coenzyme activity.

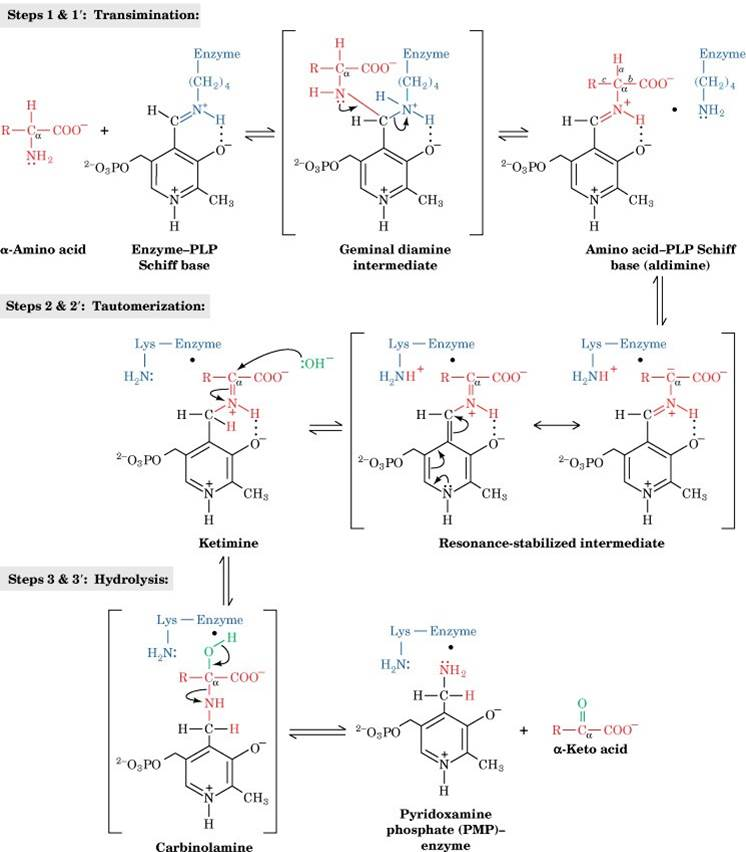
Ping Pong Bi Bi mechanism of PLP dependent enzyme catalyzed transamination. Aminotransferase reaction occurs in two stages consisting of three steps: Transimination, Tautomerisation and Hydolysis. In the first stage, alpha amino group of the aminoacid is transferred to PLP yielding an alpha ketoacid and PMP. In the second stage of the reaction, in which the amino group of PMP is transferred to a different alpha Ketoacid to yield a new alpha amino acid and PLP.

The product of transamination reactions depend on the availability of α-keto acids. The products usually are either alanine, aspartate or glutamate, since their corresponding alpha-keto acids are produced through metabolism of fuels. Being a major degradative aminoacid pathway, lysine, proline and threonine are the only three amino acids that do not always undergo transamination and rather use respective dehydrogenase.

== Non-enzymatic transamination ==
A second type of transamination reaction can be described as a nucleophilic substitution of one amine or amide anion on an amine or ammonium salt. For example, the attack of a primary amine by a primary amide anion can be used to prepare secondary amines:

RNH_{2} + R'NH^{−} → RR'NH + NH_{2}^{−}

Symmetric secondary amines can be prepared using Raney nickel (2RNH_{2} → R_{2}NH + NH_{3}). And finally, quaternary ammonium salts can be dealkylated using ethanolamine:

R_{4}N^{+} + NH_{2}CH_{2}CH_{2}OH → R_{3}N + RN^{+}H_{2}CH_{2}CH_{2}OH

Aminonaphthalenes also undergo transaminations.

== The role of specific tissues and organs in transamination ==
Transamination takes place in several tissues and organs, especially the liver and skeletal muscle, which work together to manage amino groups generated during amino acid catabolism. The liver is the primary site of transamination. After proteins are digested into their monomers, amino acids, these amino acids are transported to the liver. In the cytoplasm of hepatocytes, the amino groups from many amino acids are transferred to α-ketoglutarate, forming glutamate in a transamination reaction. Through this process the amino groups from different amino acids are combined into glutamate, reducing the need for multiple enzymes in subsequent elimination or biosynthetic processes.

After this transamination reaction, glutamate is transported into the mitochondria, where glutamate dehydrogenase catalyzes an oxidative deamination reaction, releasing ammonium. Free ammonium is toxic to cells, so the liver rapidly converts it to carbamoyl phosphate through a reaction with bicarbonate, allowing it to enter the urea cycle for excretion. The liver also contains aspartate aminotransferase. This enzyme catalyzes a unique reaction where oxaloacetate, instead of α-ketoglutarate, serves as the amino-group acceptor. In this reaction, glutamate transfers an amino group to oxaloacetate, forming the amino acid aspartate and regenerating α-ketoglutarate. Aspartate can then enter the urea cycle, where it combines with citrulline.

Skeletal muscles is another site of transamination. Pyruvate is plentiful in muscle due to extensive glycolysis. Amino groups in skeletal muscles are transferred to a product of glycolysis, pyruvate, forming alanine. This transamination reaction is catalyzed by alanine aminotransferase. Alanine is then transported to the liver, where it is converted back into pyruvate (used for gluconeogenesis) by transferring its amino group to α-ketoglutarate, forming glutamate. Simultaneously, glucose is being transported from the liver (where it's more abundant due to gluconeogenesis) to the muscle, where it is consumed. This is the glucose-alanine cycle.
