= N6-acetyl-beta-lysine transaminase =

Identifiers
- EC no.: 2.6.1.65
- CAS no.: 71768-10-0

Databases
- IntEnz: IntEnz view
- BRENDA: BRENDA entry
- ExPASy: NiceZyme view
- KEGG: KEGG entry
- MetaCyc: metabolic pathway
- PRIAM: profile
- PDB structures: RCSB PDB PDBe PDBsum
- Gene Ontology: AmiGO / QuickGO
Search
- PMC: articles
- PubMed: articles
- NCBI: proteins

In enzymology, a N6-acetyl-beta-lysine transaminase (EC 2.6.1.65) is an enzyme that catalyzes the chemical reaction

6-acetamido-3-aminohexanoate + 2-oxoglutarate $\rightleftharpoons$ 6-acetamido-3-oxohexanoate + L-glutamate

Thus, the two substrates of this enzyme are 6-acetamido-3-aminohexanoate and 2-oxoglutarate, whereas its two products are 6-acetamido-3-oxohexanoate and L-glutamate.

This enzyme belongs to the family of transferases, specifically the transaminases, which transfer nitrogenous groups. The systematic name of this enzyme class is 6-acetamido-3-aminohexanoate:2-oxoglutarate aminotransferase. This enzyme is also called epsilon-acetyl-beta-lysine aminotransferase. This enzyme participates in lysine degradation. It employs one cofactor, pyridoxal phosphate.
