= Exogenous lactate =

L-lactate that is supplied to the body from an external source

Exogenous lactate
Exogenous L-lactate CH₃CH(OH)COO-
Identification
Other names	Exogenous lactate; oral L-lactate; lactate supplement; exolactate; exo lactate
Active ion	L-lactate (S-2-hydroxypropanoate)
Common salts	Sodium L-lactate, calcium L-lactate, magnesium L-lactate
Emerging forms	Lactate esters; hydrogel formulations; encapsulated lactate
Physiology
Absorption	Intestinal monocarboxylate transporters (mainly MCT1)
Cellular uptake	MCT1 (oxidative tissues); MCT4 (efflux from glycolytic tissues)
Metabolic fate	Pyruvate via lactate dehydrogenase → TCA cycle; gluconeogenic substrate
Reported intake range	≈10–25 g·h⁻¹ (proposed for endurance)
Use
Field	Sports nutrition; metabolic and clinical research
Status	Investigational; not on any anti-doping prohibited list

Exogenous lactate, sometimes referred to as Exolactate, is L-lactate that is supplied to the body from an external source, typically as an oral supplement or, in research and medical settings, by intravenous infusion. It has been investigated as a potential ergogenic aid in endurance sports, as a recovery substrate and as a metabolic intervention in clinical contexts such as traumatic brain injury and metabolic disease.

Leading researchers in this field include scientists such as George Brooks, L. Bruce Gladden, Joshua Rabinowitz, Inigo San Millán and Sheng Tony Hui.

Lactate has been historically described as a waste product, associated with muscle fatigue and acidosis. The lactate shuttle theory, developed primarily by George A. Brooks during the 1980s and 1990s, reframed lactate as a circulating energy substrate that is exchanged between glycolytic and oxidative tissues, whilst also acting as a signalling molecule. Within this framework, lactate produced in one tissue can be oxidised in another via monocarboxylate transporters (MCTs).

Most circulating lactate is produced endogenously (within the body), however humans can also absorb lactate from the gut. Exogenous lactate enters systemic circulation through intestinal MCTs, predominantly MCT1, whereupon it is rapidly converted to pyruvate by lactate dehydrogenase, before entering the tricarboxylic acid (TCA) cycle in mitochondria.

Researchers have proposed that, provided it is delivered safely and at sufficient rates (10–25 g per hour), exogenous lactate could complement carbohydrate-based fuelling during prolonged endurance exercise. Hypothesised to be possible due to the intestinal absorption of lactate using transporters independent of those used by glucose and fructose.

== History and reframing of lactate ==
Throughout much of the 20th century, lactate accumulation in blood and skeletal muscle was viewed as evidence of oxygen deficit and as a direct cause of fatigue and muscle acidosis. From the 1970s onward, utilising isotope tracers and studies of inter-organ substrate exchange, researchers progressively challenged this interpretation.

The lactate shuttle theory, formalised by Brooks, proposes that lactate is continuously produced even at rest and during fully aerobic conditions. He also proposed lactate's function as a major carbon carrier between cells and organs. Reviews in the 21st century have described lactate as a "fulcrum of metabolism" and a quantitatively important fuel whose turnover during exercise can exceed that of glucose.

== Biochemistry ==
=== Stereoisomers ===
Lactate exists as two stereoisomers, L-lactate and D-lactate. Both can be generated by microorganisms, but L-lactate is the dominant form in human metabolism and the principal product of glycolysis. D-lactate is produced only in small amounts in human tissues and is mostly of microbial origin. L-lactate is regarded as the safe, physiologically relevant form for exogenous supplementation, while the safety profile of D-lactate at supplemental doses in humans is incompletely characterised.

=== Transport and metabolism ===
Lactate moves across cell membranes through monocarboxylate transporters. MCT4 is enriched in highly glycolytic (type II) muscle fibres and exports lactate, whereas MCT1 is enriched in oxidative tissues such as type I muscle fibres, the heart, the brain and the liver, where it imports lactate for oxidation.

Inside the cell, lactate is interconverted with pyruvate by lactate dehydrogenase (LDH). Pyruvate enters the mitochondrion, where it is decarboxylated by the pyruvate dehydrogenase (PDH) complex to acetyl-CoA, which feeds the TCA cycle. Evidence in rat neurons supports the existence of a mitochondrial lactate oxidation complex (mLOC) that allows direct lactate oxidation within the mitochondrion.

Beyond its role as a fuel, lactate functions as a signalling molecule, sometimes called a "lactormone". Activation of the hydroxycarboxylic-acid receptor 1 (HCAR1, also known as GPR81) suppresses adipose-tissue lipolysis, while intracellular lactate has been linked to transcriptional pathways such as PGC-1α that regulate mitochondrial biogenesis.

== Proposed mechanisms during exercise ==
The mechanisms by which exogenous lactate may influence exercise metabolism are summarised briefly below; direct evidence in humans remains limited.

=== At low-to-moderate intensities ===
Below the lactate threshold, exogenous lactate absorbed from the gut may serve as an additional oxidative fuel for working muscle, potentially reducing reliance on endogenous glycogen stores — a concept known as glycogen sparing.

Additionally, lactate can be reconverted to glucose by the liver through the Cori cycle, potentially supporting glucose homeostasis during prolonged exercise.

=== At high intensities ===
Above the lactate threshold, exogenous lactate may support the metabolic shift toward carbohydrate-derived oxidation by contributing to pyruvate availability and sustaining glycolytic flux. The precise mechanisms remain under investigation.

=== During recovery and resting conditions ===
Animal studies suggest that exogenous lactate may increase lipid oxidation at rest and promote glycogen recovery after exercise. In humans, exogenous lactate increases cerebral lactate utilisation, an effect of interest in brain injury management.

=== Gut microbiota interactions ===
Lactate that is not absorbed in the small intestine can interact with the colonic microbiota. The bacterium Veillonella atypica, which is enriched in the gut of elite endurance runners, metabolises lactate to short-chain fatty acids, including propionate, that may then be used by the host. This finding has prompted interest in targeted colonic delivery of exogenous lactate as a way of shaping microbial metabolism.

=== Evidence in humans ===
Human trials of oral lactate supplementation have produced mixed results. In a double-blind crossover trial, Ewell et al. (2024) reported a statistically significant 4% increase in average work rate during a 20-minute cycling time trial with a commercial lactate supplement, without changes in heart rate or perceived exertion. Conversely, Bordoli et al. (2024) found no performance improvement after 120 mg·kg⁻¹ of calcium lactate in trained cyclists completing repeated 1 km and 4 km time trials, despite significant increases in blood bicarbonate concentration and a reduction in ratings of perceived exertion. An earlier trial by Northgraves et al. (2014) similarly observed no effect of oral lactate on 40 km cycling time-trial performance.

Seike, Takahashi and Hatta (2025) examined the metabolic effects of acute oral lactate supplementation in twelve healthy subjects during rest and exercise, providing early data on how oral lactate influences energy substrate utilisation in humans. Separately, Pedersen et al. (2022) showed that a single 20 g oral dose of sodium lactate slowed gastric emptying and suppressed appetite in young men, raising practical questions about tolerability at higher doses during exercise.

In animal models, chronic lactate intake over four weeks increased fat oxidation, raised VO₂max and enhanced exercise performance in mice, suggesting potential long-term metabolic adaptations that have not yet been confirmed in human subjects.

Overall, the existing evidence suggests that low-to-moderate oral doses of lactate salt may modulate acid–base balance and metabolic markers, however are generally insufficient to produce consistent ergogenic effects. Whether higher delivery rates — achievable through novel formulations — would translate mechanistic predictions into measurable performance gains remains an open question.

== Use in sports nutrition ==
=== Dual-fuel model with carbohydrates ===
High rates of carbohydrate ingestion (up to about 90–120 g·h⁻¹) improve endurance performance and post-exercise recovery, but they are constrained by saturation of the intestinal glucose and fructose transporters SGLT1 and GLUT5. Because lactate is absorbed by MCTs rather than by these transporters, co-ingestion with carbohydrate has been proposed as a way to raise the ceiling of total exogenous energy delivery without further loading the carbohydrate transport pathways.

It has been proposed that an additional 10–25 g·h⁻¹ of exogenous lactate (in addition to conventional carbohydrate intakes) could create a "dual-fuel" approach to endurance fuelling, although this concept has not yet been validated in controlled trials.

=== Suggested intake rates ===
Most published human studies of oral lactate have used relatively low doses (about 120–375 mg·kg⁻¹, or 0.4–1.1 g per dose) of sodium or calcium lactate.

Few of these protocols have shown clear physiological or performance benefits, an outcome that has been attributed to insufficient delivery rates.

Studies that have used either higher oral doses or intravenous infusion show measurable systemic effects. A 20 g oral dose of sodium lactate raised blood lactate above 2 mmol·L⁻¹ and altered gut-related hormones in healthy men. Infusion studies delivering between 13 and 24 g·h⁻¹, and up to about 60 g·h⁻¹, increased circulating lactate, increased cerebral lactate utilisation, suppressed lipolysis and reduced endogenous glucose production.

=== Real world application ===
As of June 2026, Exogenous Lactate products have entered the Sports Nutrition market in the form of gels. Rumours that such products will be used by teams in the 2026 Tour de France are included in news reports.

=== Forms of exogenous lactate ===
- Sodium L-lactate – the most common form in published human trials.
- Calcium L-lactate – also used in human trials; both salts impose a high cation load at performance-relevant doses.
- Magnesium L-lactate and combined salt blends – used to reduce the load of any single cation.
- Lactate esters – emerging compounds analogous to ketone esters that could allow non-ionic lactate delivery.
- Hydrogel and encapsulation systems – physicochemical strategies adapted from carbohydrate hydrogels and used to modulate gastric emptying and intestinal release

== Practical limitations ==
Conventional salt-based formulations require very high cation loads at 10–25 g·h⁻¹, raising the risk of gastrointestinal distress and electrolyte imbalance.

Oral lactate ingestion can also produce a degree of systemic alkalinisation through hepatic metabolism of lactate, together with its accompanying cation. While mild alkalosis may transiently increase buffering capacity, larger acid–base disturbances could impair enzymatic function and excitation–contraction coupling.

Researchers have therefore proposed novel delivery systems modelled on advances in other supplement classes. Examples include ketone esters, which have enabled delivery of up to 20 g·h⁻¹ of exogenous ketones with acceptable tolerance and carbohydrate hydrogels that have improved exogenous carbohydrate oxidation. Analogous lactate technologies — including lactate esters, polymer-based formulations and hydrogel or encapsulation systems — are being explored to allow high-rate delivery without excessive ionic load or osmotic stress. It is hypothesised any breakthrough in this area will markedly increase performance in athletes.

== Health and clinical applications ==
Beyond athletic performance, exogenous lactate has been studied as a metabolic substrate in several clinical settings:

- Traumatic brain injury – intravenous lactate has been shown to increase cerebral lactate uptake and reduce cerebral glucose consumption in injured patients, supporting its evaluation as a metabolic adjunct in neurocritical care.
- Glycogen recovery and rehabilitation – animal data suggest that lactate given after exercise can promote glycogen resynthesis in type II fibres, of potential interest in physical rehabilitation.
- Tissue repair – preclinical work indicates that lactate can promote a pro-regenerative macrophage phenotype, supporting angiogenesis and muscle regeneration after ischaemia.
- Metabolic regulation – oral lactate slows gastric emptying and suppresses appetite in young men, prompting interest in its use as a metabolic and appetite-modulating agent.

== Safety and regulatory status ==
L-lactate salts (sodium, calcium and magnesium L-lactate) are widely permitted as food ingredients and are commonly used as acidity regulators. Reported adverse effects of high-dose oral L-lactate include gastrointestinal discomfort and electrolyte changes related to the accompanying cation, especially with sodium.

L-lactate is endogenous to human metabolism and is not classified as a prohibited substance by the World Anti-Doping Agency. Lactate-based products marketed as sports supplements are subject to general food-supplement regulations in their respective jurisdictions, which may differ in their handling of novel formulations such as lactate esters.

D-lactate has different pharmacokinetics from L-lactate and has been implicated in D-lactic acidosis in patients with short-bowel syndrome. Its use as a deliberate dietary supplement at doses comparable to those proposed for L-lactate is not currently considered established as safe.

== Research outlook ==
Most evidence on the metabolic effects of exogenous lactate in humans comes either from low-dose oral trials with limited physiological impact, or from intravenous infusion studies that are not feasible during real-world exercise. Several reviews have called for randomised controlled trials of high-rate oral lactate delivery. Trials would ideally utilise formulations that minimise cation load and gastrointestinal disturbance, in order to test whether the mechanistic predictions of the lactate-shuttle framework translate into measurable performance and health benefits.

== See also ==
- Lactic acid
- Lactate threshold
- Cori cycle
- Monocarboxylate transporter
- Sports nutrition
- Carbohydrate loading
- Ketone bodies and ketone esters
