= 2,5-diaminovalerate transaminase =

Class of enzymes

Identifiers
- EC no.: 2.6.1.8
- CAS no.: 9030-39-1

Databases
- IntEnz: IntEnz view
- BRENDA: BRENDA entry
- ExPASy: NiceZyme view
- KEGG: KEGG entry
- MetaCyc: metabolic pathway
- PRIAM: profile
- PDB structures: RCSB PDB PDBe PDBsum
- Gene Ontology: AmiGO / QuickGO
Search
- PMC: articles
- PubMed: articles
- NCBI: proteins

In enzymology, a 2,5-diaminovalerate transaminase (EC 2.6.1.8) was a putative enzyme that would have catalyzed the chemical reaction

2,5-diaminopentanoate + 2-oxoglutarate $\rightleftharpoons$ 5-amino-2-oxopentanoate + L-glutamate

Thus, the two substrates of this enzyme would have been 2,5-diaminopentanoate and 2-oxoglutarate, whereas its two products would have been 5-amino-2-oxopentanoate and L-glutamate. The reaction however most likely does not happen.

It was thought to use one cofactor, pyridoxal phosphate.

== Nomenclature ==
The enzyme would have belonged to the family of transferases, specifically the transaminases, which transfer nitrogenous groups. The systematic name of this enzyme class is 2,5-diaminopentanoate:2-oxoglutarate aminotransferase. Other names in common use include diamino-acid transaminase, and diamino acid aminotransferase.
