= UDP-2-acetamido-4-amino-2,4,6-trideoxyglucose transaminase =

Identifiers
- EC no.: 2.6.1.34
- CAS no.: 37277-89-7

Databases
- IntEnz: IntEnz view
- BRENDA: BRENDA entry
- ExPASy: NiceZyme view
- KEGG: KEGG entry
- MetaCyc: metabolic pathway
- PRIAM: profile
- PDB structures: RCSB PDB PDBe PDBsum
- Gene Ontology: AmiGO / QuickGO
Search
- PMC: articles
- PubMed: articles
- NCBI: proteins

In enzymology, an UDP-2-acetamido-4-amino-2,4,6-trideoxyglucose transaminase (EC 2.6.1.34) is an enzyme that catalyzes the chemical reaction

UDP-2-acetamido-4-amino-2,4,6-trideoxyglucose + 2-oxoglutarate $\rightleftharpoons$ UDP-2-acetamido-4-dehydro-2,6-dideoxyglucose + L-glutamate

Thus, the two substrates of this enzyme are UDP-2-acetamido-4-amino-2,4,6-trideoxyglucose and 2-oxoglutarate, whereas its two products are UDP-2-acetamido-4-dehydro-2,6-dideoxyglucose and L-glutamate.

This enzyme belongs to the family of transferases, specifically the transaminases, which transfer nitrogenous groups. The systematic name of this enzyme class is UDP-2-acetamido-4-amino-2,4,6-trideoxyglucose:2-oxoglutarate aminotransferase. Other names in common use include uridine diphospho-4-amino-2-acetamido-2,4,6-trideoxyglucose, and aminotransferase. It employs one cofactor, pyridoxal phosphate.
