= 5-aminovalerate transaminase =

Class of enzymes

Identifiers
- EC no.: 2.6.1.48
- CAS no.: 37277-97-7

Databases
- IntEnz: IntEnz view
- BRENDA: BRENDA entry
- ExPASy: NiceZyme view
- KEGG: KEGG entry
- MetaCyc: metabolic pathway
- PRIAM: profile
- PDB structures: RCSB PDB PDBe PDBsum
- Gene Ontology: AmiGO / QuickGO
Search
- PMC: articles
- PubMed: articles
- NCBI: proteins

5-aminovalerate transaminase (EC 2.6.1.48) is a pyridoxal phosphate-dependent enzyme that catalyzes the chemical reaction

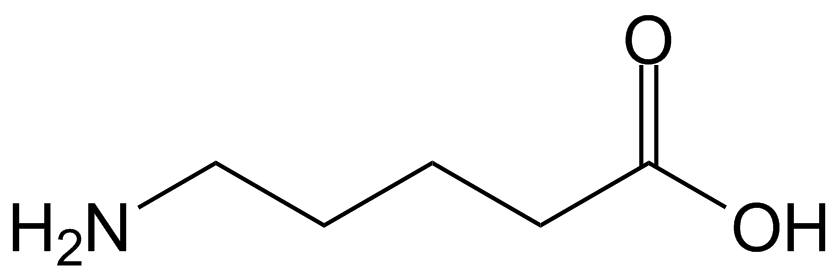
δ-aminovaleric acid
+
α-ketoglutaric acid
5-oxopentanoic acid
+
L-glutamic acid

The two substrates of this enzyme characterised from Pseudomonas bacteria are δ-aminovaleric acid and α-ketoglutaric acid. Its products are 5-oxopentanoic acid and L-glutamic acid.

This enzyme is a transferase, specifically a transaminase, which transfer nitrogenous groups. The systematic name of this enzyme class is 5-aminopentanoate:2-oxoglutarate aminotransferase. Other names in common use include 5-aminovalerate aminotransferase, delta-aminovalerate aminotransferase, and delta-aminovalerate transaminase. It participates in lysine degradation.
