= Cysteine-conjugate transaminase =

cysteine-conjugate transaminase

Identifiers
- EC no.: 2.6.1.75
- CAS no.: 117698-05-2

Databases
- IntEnz: IntEnz view
- BRENDA: BRENDA entry
- ExPASy: NiceZyme view
- KEGG: KEGG entry
- MetaCyc: metabolic pathway
- PRIAM: profile
- PDB structures: RCSB PDB PDBe PDBsum
- Gene Ontology: AmiGO / QuickGO
Search
- PMC: articles
- PubMed: articles
- NCBI: proteins

In enzymology, a cysteine-conjugate transaminase (EC 2.6.1.75) is an enzyme that catalyzes the chemical reaction

S-(4-bromophenyl)-L-cysteine + 2-oxoglutarate $\rightleftharpoons$ S-(4-bromophenyl)mercaptopyruvate + L-glutamate

Thus, the two substrates of this enzyme are S-(4-bromophenyl)-L-cysteine and 2-oxoglutarate, whereas its two products are S-(4-bromophenyl)mercaptopyruvate and L-glutamate.

This enzyme belongs to the family of transferases, specifically the transaminases, which transfer nitrogenous groups. The systematic name of this enzyme class is S-(4-bromophenyl)-L-cysteine:2-oxoglutarate aminotransferase. Other names in common use include cysteine conjugate aminotransferase, and cysteine-conjugate alpha-ketoglutarate transaminase (CAT-1).
