= DTDP-4-amino-4,6-dideoxygalactose transaminase =

dTDP-4-amino-4,6-dideoxygalactose transaminase

Identifiers
- EC no.: 2.6.1.59
- CAS no.: 72560-97-5

Databases
- IntEnz: IntEnz view
- BRENDA: BRENDA entry
- ExPASy: NiceZyme view
- KEGG: KEGG entry
- MetaCyc: metabolic pathway
- PRIAM: profile
- PDB structures: RCSB PDB PDBe PDBsum
- Gene Ontology: AmiGO / QuickGO
Search
- PMC: articles
- PubMed: articles
- NCBI: proteins

In enzymology, a dTDP-4-amino-4,6-dideoxygalactose transaminase (EC 2.6.1.59) is an enzyme that catalyzes the chemical reaction

dTDP-4-amino-4,6-dideoxy-D-galactose + 2-oxoglutarate $\rightleftharpoons$ dTDP-4-dehydro-6-deoxy-D-galactose + L-glutamate

Thus, the two substrates of this enzyme are dTDP-4-amino-4,6-dideoxy-D-galactose and 2-oxoglutarate, whereas its two products are dTDP-4-dehydro-6-deoxy-D-galactose and L-glutamate.

This enzyme belongs to the family of transferases, specifically the transaminases, which transfer nitrogenous groups. The systematic name of this enzyme class is dTDP-4,6-dideoxy-D-galactose:2-oxoglutarate aminotransferase. Other names in common use include thymidine diphosphoaminodideoxygalactose aminotransferase, and thymidine diphosphate 4-keto-6-deoxy-D-glucose transaminase. It employs one cofactor, pyridoxal phosphate.
