= Diiodotyrosine transaminase =

Identifiers
- EC no.: 2.6.1.24
- CAS no.: 9033-18-5

Databases
- IntEnz: IntEnz view
- BRENDA: BRENDA entry
- ExPASy: NiceZyme view
- KEGG: KEGG entry
- MetaCyc: metabolic pathway
- PRIAM: profile
- PDB structures: RCSB PDB PDBe PDBsum
- Gene Ontology: AmiGO / QuickGO
Search
- PMC: articles
- PubMed: articles
- NCBI: proteins

Diiodotyrosine transaminase (EC 2.6.1.24) is an enzyme that catalyzes the reversible chemical reaction

diiodotyrosine
+
α-ketoglutaric acid
(1)
+
L-glutamic acid

The two substrates of this enzyme characterised from rat kidney are diiodotyrosine and α-ketoglutaric acid. Its products are 3,5-diiodo-4-hydroxyphenyl)pyruvic acid (1) and L-glutamic acid. It uses pyridoxal phosphate as a cofactor and is involved in the breakdown of thyroid hormones.

This enzyme is a transferase, specifically a transaminase, which transfer nitrogenous groups. The systematic name of this enzyme class is 3,5-diiodo-L-tyrosine:2-oxoglutarate aminotransferase. Other names in common use include diiodotyrosine aminotransferase, halogenated tyrosine aminotransferase, and halogenated tyrosine transaminase.
