= Adenosylmethionine—8-amino-7-oxononanoate transaminase =

adenosylmethionine-8-amino-7-oxononanoate transaminase

Identifiers
- EC no.: 2.6.1.62
- CAS no.: 37259-71-5

Databases
- IntEnz: IntEnz view
- BRENDA: BRENDA entry
- ExPASy: NiceZyme view
- KEGG: KEGG entry
- MetaCyc: metabolic pathway
- PRIAM: profile
- PDB structures: RCSB PDB PDBe PDBsum
- Gene Ontology: AmiGO / QuickGO
Search
- PMC: articles
- PubMed: articles
- NCBI: proteins

In enzymology, an adenosylmethionine-8-amino-7-oxononanoate transaminase (EC 2.6.1.62) is an enzyme that catalyzes the chemical reaction

S-adenosyl-L-methionine + 8-amino-7-oxononanoate $\rightleftharpoons$ S-adenosyl-4-methylthio-2-oxobutanoate + 7,8-diaminononanoate

Thus, the two substrates of this enzyme are S-adenosyl-L-methionine and 8-amino-7-oxononanoate, whereas its two products are S-adenosyl-4-methylthio-2-oxobutanoate and 7,8-diaminononanoate.

This enzyme belongs to the family of transferases, specifically the transaminases, which transfer nitrogenous groups. The systematic name of this enzyme class is S-adenosyl-L-methionine:8-amino-7-oxononanoate aminotransferase. Other names in common use include 7,8-diaminonanoate transaminase, 7,8-diaminononanoate transaminase, DAPA transaminase, 7,8-diaminopelargonic acid aminotransferase, DAPA aminotransferase, 7-keto-8-aminopelargonic acid, diaminopelargonate synthase, and 7-keto-8-aminopelargonic acid aminotransferase. This enzyme participates in biotin metabolism. It employs one cofactor, pyridoxal phosphate.

== Structural studies ==
As of late 2007, 11 structures have been solved for this class of enzymes, with PDB accession codes 1DTY, 1MGV, 1MLY, 1MLZ, 1QJ3, 1QJ5, 1S06, 1S07, 1S08, 1S09, and 1S0A.
