= Radioactive tracer =

Chemical compound

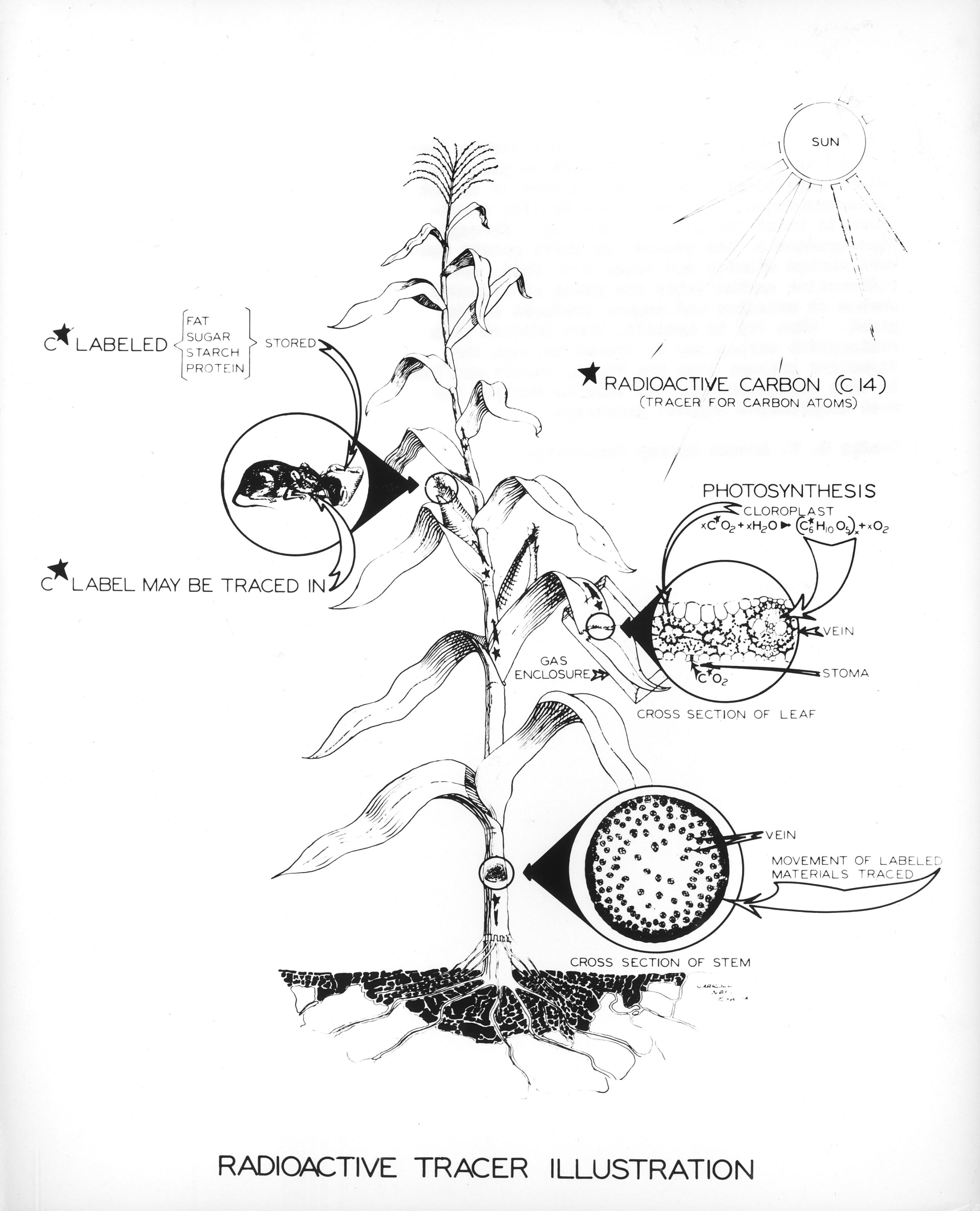
Illustration showing the use of beta-decaying carbon-14 as a radioactive tracer in a plant.

A radioactive tracer, radiotracer, or radioactive label is a synthetic derivative of a natural compound in which one or more atoms have been replaced by a radionuclide (a radioactive atom). By virtue of its radioactive decay, it can be used to explore the mechanism of chemical reactions by tracing the path that the radioisotope follows from reactants to products. Radiolabeling or radiotracing is thus the radioactive form of isotopic labeling. In biological contexts, experiments that use radioisotope tracers are sometimes called radioisotope feeding experiments.

Radioisotopes of hydrogen, carbon, phosphorus, sulfur, and iodine have been used extensively to trace the path of biochemical reactions. A radioactive tracer can also be used to track the distribution of a substance within a natural system such as a cell or tissue, or as a flow tracer to track fluid flow. Radioactive tracers are also used to determine the location of fractures created by hydraulic fracturing in natural gas production. Radioactive tracers form the basis of a variety of imaging systems, such as, PET scans, SPECT scans and technetium scans. Radiocarbon dating uses the naturally occurring carbon-14 isotope as an isotopic label.

In radiopharmaceutical sciences some misuse of established scientific terms exist. Therefore an international "Working Group on Nomenclature in Radiopharmaceutical Chemistry and Related Areas" was formed in 2015 by the Society of Radiopharmaceutical Sciences (SRS). Their goal was to clarify terminology and to establish a standardized nomenclature through global consensus, ensuring consistency and accuracy within the discipline.

== Methodology ==
Isotopes of a chemical element differ only in the mass number. For example, the isotopes of hydrogen can be written as ^{1}H, ^{2}H and ^{3}H, with the mass number superscripted to the left. When the atomic nucleus of an isotope is unstable, compounds containing this isotope are radioactive. Tritium is an example of a radioactive isotope.

The principle behind the use of radioactive tracers is that an atom in a chemical compound is replaced by another atom, of the same chemical element. The substituting atom, however, is a radioactive isotope. This process is often called radioactive labeling. The power of the technique is due to the fact that radioactive decay is much more energetic than chemical reactions. Therefore, the radioactive isotope can be present in low concentration and its presence detected by sensitive radiation detectors such as Geiger counters and scintillation counters. George de Hevesy won the 1943 Nobel Prize for Chemistry "for his work on the use of isotopes as tracers in the study of chemical processes".

There are two main ways in which radioactive tracers are used

1. When a labeled chemical compound undergoes chemical reactions one or more of the products will contain the radioactive label. Analysis of what happens to the radioactive isotope provides detailed information on the mechanism of the chemical reaction.
2. A radioactive compound is introduced into a living organism and the radio-isotope provides a means to construct an image showing the way in which that compound and its reaction products are distributed around the organism.

== Production ==
The commonly used radioisotopes have short half lives and so do not occur in nature in large amounts. They are produced by nuclear reactions. One of the most important processes is absorption of a neutron by an atomic nucleus, in which the mass number of the element concerned increases by 1 for each neutron absorbed. For example,

^{13}C + n → ^{14}C

In this case the atomic mass increases, but the element is unchanged. In other cases the product nucleus is unstable and decays, typically emitting protons, electrons (beta particle) or alpha particles. When a nucleus loses a proton the atomic number decreases by 1. For example,

^{32}S + n → ^{32}P + p

Neutron irradiation is performed in a nuclear reactor. The other main method used to synthesize radioisotopes is proton bombardment. The proton are accelerated to high energy either in a cyclotron or a linear accelerator.

== Tracer isotopes ==
=== Hydrogen ===
Tritium (hydrogen-3) is produced by neutron irradiation of ^{6}Li:

^{6}Li + n → ^{4}He + ^{3}H

Tritium has a half-life 4500±8 days (approximately 12.32 years) and it decays by beta decay. The electrons produced have an average energy of 5.7 keV. Because the emitted electrons have relatively low energy, the detection efficiency by scintillation counting is rather low. However, hydrogen atoms are present in all organic compounds, so tritium is frequently used as a tracer in biochemical studies.

=== Carbon ===
^{11}C decays by positron emission with a half-life of ca. 20 min. ^{11}C is one of the isotopes often used in positron emission tomography.

^{14}C decays by beta decay, with a half-life of 5730 years. It is continuously produced in the upper atmosphere of the earth, so it occurs at a trace level in the environment. However, it is not practical to use naturally occurring ^{14}C for tracer studies. Instead it is made by neutron irradiation of the isotope ^{13}C which occurs naturally in carbon at about the 1.1% level. ^{14}C has been used extensively to trace the progress of organic molecules through metabolic pathways.

=== Nitrogen ===
^{13}N decays by positron emission with a half-life of 9.97 min. It is produced by the nuclear reaction

^{1}H + ^{16}O → ^{13}N + ^{4}He

^{13}N is used in positron emission tomography (PET scan).

=== Oxygen ===
^{15}O decays by positron emission with a half-life of 122 seconds. It is used in positron emission tomography.

=== Fluorine ===
^{18}F decays predominantly by β emission, with a half-life of 109.8 min. It is made by proton bombardment of ^{18}O in a cyclotron or linear particle accelerator. It is an important isotope in the radiopharmaceutical industry. For example, it is used to make labeled fluorodeoxyglucose (FDG) or D-3-[^{18}F]fluoroalanine for application in PET scans.

=== Phosphorus ===
^{32}P is made by neutron bombardment of ^{32}S

^{32}S + n → ^{32}P + p

It decays by beta decay with a half-life of 14.29 days. It is commonly used to study protein phosphorylation by kinases in biochemistry.

^{33}P is made in relatively low yield by neutron bombardment of ^{31}P. It is also a beta-emitter, with a half-life of 25.4 days. Though more expensive than ^{32}P, the emitted electrons are less energetic, permitting better resolution in, for example, DNA sequencing.

Both isotopes are useful for labeling nucleotides and other species that contain a phosphate group.

=== Sulfur ===
^{35}S is made by neutron bombardment of ^{35}Cl

^{35}Cl + n → ^{35}S + p

It decays by beta-decay with a half-life of 87.51 days. It is used to label the sulfur-containing amino-acids methionine and cysteine. When a sulfur atom replaces an oxygen atom in a phosphate group on a nucleotide a thiophosphate is produced, so ^{35}S can also be used to trace a phosphate group.

=== Technetium ===
^{99m}Tc is a very versatile radioisotope, and is the most commonly used radioisotope tracer in medicine. It is easy to produce in a technetium-99m generator, by decay of ^{99}Mo.

^{99}Mo → ^{99m}Tc + e^{−} + ν̅_{e}

The molybdenum isotope has a half-life of approximately 66 hours (2.75 days), so the generator has a useful life of about two weeks. Most commercial ^{99m}Tc generators use column chromatography, in which ^{99}Mo in the form of molybdate, MoO_{4}^{2−} is adsorbed onto acid alumina (Al_{2}O_{3}). When the ^{99}Mo decays it forms pertechnetate TcO_{4}^{−}, which because of its single charge is less tightly bound to the alumina. Pulling normal saline solution through the column of immobilized ^{99}Mo elutes the soluble ^{99m}Tc, resulting in a saline solution containing the ^{99m}Tc as the dissolved sodium salt of the pertechnetate. The pertechnetate is treated with a reducing agent such as Sn^{2+} and a ligand. Different ligands form coordination complexes which give the technetium enhanced affinity for particular sites in the human body.

^{99m}Tc decays by gamma emission, with a half-life: 6.01 hours. The short half-life ensures that the body-concentration of the radioisotope falls effectively to zero in a few days.

=== Iodine ===
^{123}I is produced by proton irradiation of ^{124}Xe. The caesium isotope produced is unstable and decays to ^{123}I. The isotope is usually supplied as the iodide and hypoiodate in dilute sodium hydroxide solution, at high isotopic purity. ^{123}I has also been produced at Oak Ridge National Laboratories by proton bombardment of ^{123}Te.

^{123}I decays by electron capture with a half-life of 13.22 hours. The emitted 159 keV gamma ray is used in single-photon emission computed tomography (SPECT). A 127 keV gamma ray is also emitted.

^{125}I is frequently used in radioimmunoassays because of its relatively long half-life (59 days) and ability to be detected with high sensitivity by gamma counters.

^{129}I is present in the environment as a result of the testing of nuclear weapons in the atmosphere. It was also produced in the Chernobyl and Fukushima disasters. ^{129}I decays with a half-life of 15.7 million years, with low-energy beta and gamma emissions. It is not used as a tracer, though its presence in living organisms, including human beings, can be characterized by measurement of the gamma rays.

=== Other isotopes ===
Many other isotopes have been used in specialized radiopharmacological studies. The most widely used is ^{67}Ga for gallium scans. ^{67}Ga is used because, like ^{99m}Tc, it is a gamma-ray emitter and various ligands can be attached to the Ga^{3+} ion, forming a coordination complex which may have selective affinity for particular sites in the human body.

An extensive list of radioactive tracers used in hydraulic fracturing can be found below.

== Applications ==
In metabolism research, tritium and ^{14}C-labeled glucose are commonly used in glucose clamps to measure rates of glucose uptake, fatty acid synthesis, and other metabolic processes. While radioactive tracers are sometimes still used in human studies, stable isotope tracers such as ^{13}C are more commonly used in current human clamp studies. Radioactive tracers are also used to study lipoprotein metabolism in humans and experimental animals.

In medicine, tracers are applied in a number of tests, such as ^{99m}Tc in autoradiography and nuclear medicine, including single-photon emission computed tomography (SPECT), positron emission tomography (PET) and scintigraphy. The urea breath test for helicobacter pylori commonly used a dose of ^{14}C labeled urea to detect h. pylori infection. If the labeled urea was metabolized by h. pylori in the stomach, the patient's breath would contain labeled carbon dioxide. In recent years, the use of substances enriched in the non-radioactive isotope ^{13}C has become the preferred method, avoiding patient exposure to radioactivity.

In hydraulic fracturing, radioactive tracer isotopes are injected with hydraulic fracturing fluid to determine the injection profile and location of created fractures. Tracers with different half-lives are used for each stage of hydraulic fracturing. In the United States amounts per injection of radionuclide are listed in the US Nuclear Regulatory Commission (NRC) guidelines. According to the NRC, some of the most commonly used tracers include antimony-124, bromine-82, iodine-125, iodine-131, iridium-192, and scandium-46. A 2003 publication by the International Atomic Energy Agency confirms the frequent use of most of the tracers above, and says that manganese-56, sodium-24, technetium-99m, silver-110m, argon-41, and xenon-133 are also used extensively because they are easily identified and measured.
