= Alanine (data page) =

Chemical data page

The complete data for Alanine
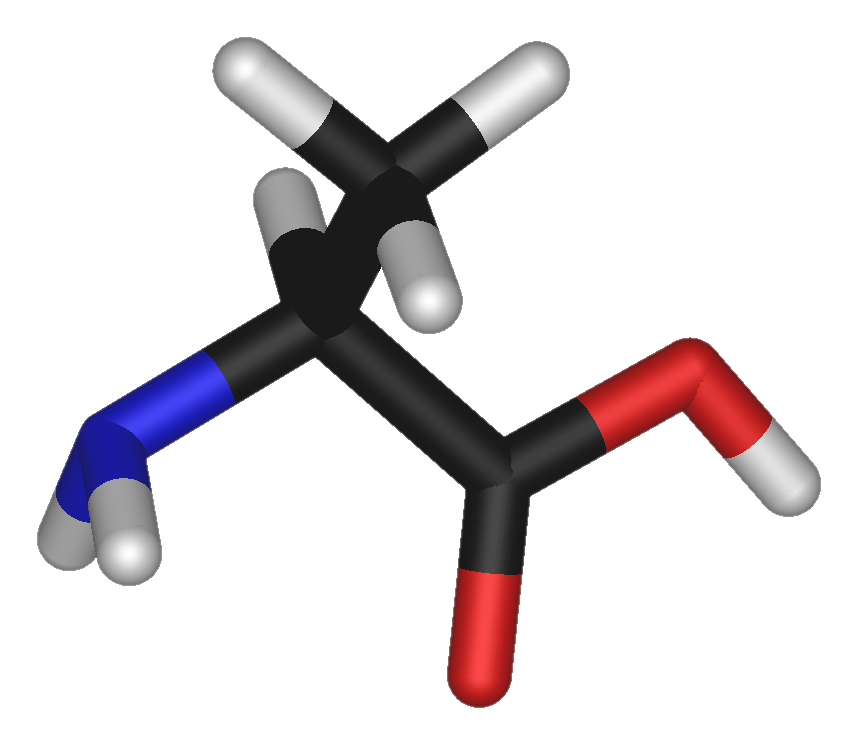
General information
Chemical formula: C_{3}H_{7}NO_{2}
Molar mass: 89.1 g·mol^{−1}
Systematic name:
(S)-2-aminopropanoic acid
Abbreviations: A, Ala
Synonyms:
2-aminopropanoic acid
{α/2}-aminopropionic acid
AIDS{-}071780
HSDB 1801
NSC 206315
Database data
SMILES: N[C@@]([H])(C)C(O)=O
InChI=1/C3H7NO2/c1-2(4)3(5)6/h2H,4H2,1H3,(H,5,6)/f/h5H

ATC: N/A	CAS: 338-69-2 (D), 56-41-7 (L)	DrugBank: N/A	EINECS: 206-418-1 (D)^{a}, 200-273-8 (L)^{a}	PubChem: 602 (D)^{a}, 5950 (L)^{a}

Physical properties

Structure	Crystal data	Spectral data: UV-Vis / IR / NMR / MS: Masses of main fragments: Alanine GC-MS spectrum

Phase behavior	Solid properties ρ_{solid}: 1.401 g.cm^{−3} T_{m}: 297 °C	Liquid properties	Gas properties

Hazard properties

MSDS N/A	Main hazards: N/A	NFPA 704	Flash point: N/A	RTECS number: N/A

Chemical properties

XLogP: -2.912	pI: 6.00	pK_{a}: 2.33, 9.71	Tautomers:	Hydrogen bond: donor - 2; acceptor - 3

Pharmacological properties

This box:
- Except where noted otherwise, data relate to Standard temperature and pressure.
- Reliability of data general note.
