= Fluoroalanine =

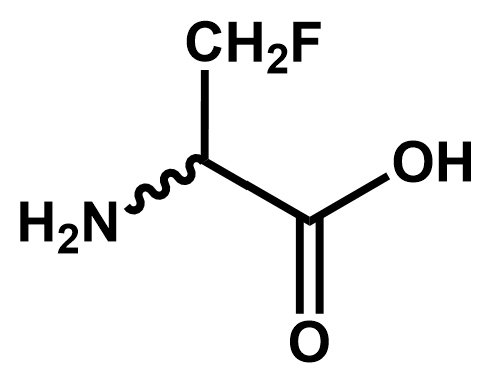

Names
- IUPAC name (2S)-2-amino-3-fluoropropanoic acid
- Other names β-fluoroalanine

Identifiers
CAS Number	35455-20-0
3D model (JSmol)	Interactive image
ChEMBL	ChEMBL2111117
ChemSpider	388831
ECHA InfoCard	100.047.810
KEGG	C02638
PubChem CID	439775
UNII	6E8IWO1KN2
CompTox Dashboard (EPA)	DTXSID801351399 DTXSID70913799, DTXSID801351399
- InChI: InChI=1S/C3H6FNO2/c4-1-2(5)3(6)7/h2H,1,5H2,(H,6,7)/t2-/m1/s1 Key: UYTSRQMXRROFPU-UWTATZPHSA-N
- SMILES: C([C@H](C(=O)O)N)F

Properties
Chemical formula	C_{3}H_{6}FNO_{2}
Molar mass	107.084 g·mol^{−1}
- Except where otherwise noted, data are given for materials in their standard state (at 25 °C [77 °F], 100 kPa). Infobox references

Fluoroalanine, specifically 3-fluoro-alanine, is a fluorinated analogue of the amino acid alanine. Historically considered as an antibiotic, it also has potential applications as a radioactive tracer in positron emission tomography (PET).

== Synthesis ==
The first reported syntheses of fluoroalanine in 1976 involved treating cysteine with difluorine under an inert atmosphere. This produced a mixture of 3-fluoroalanine and 3,3-difluoroalanine, with the former as the major component.

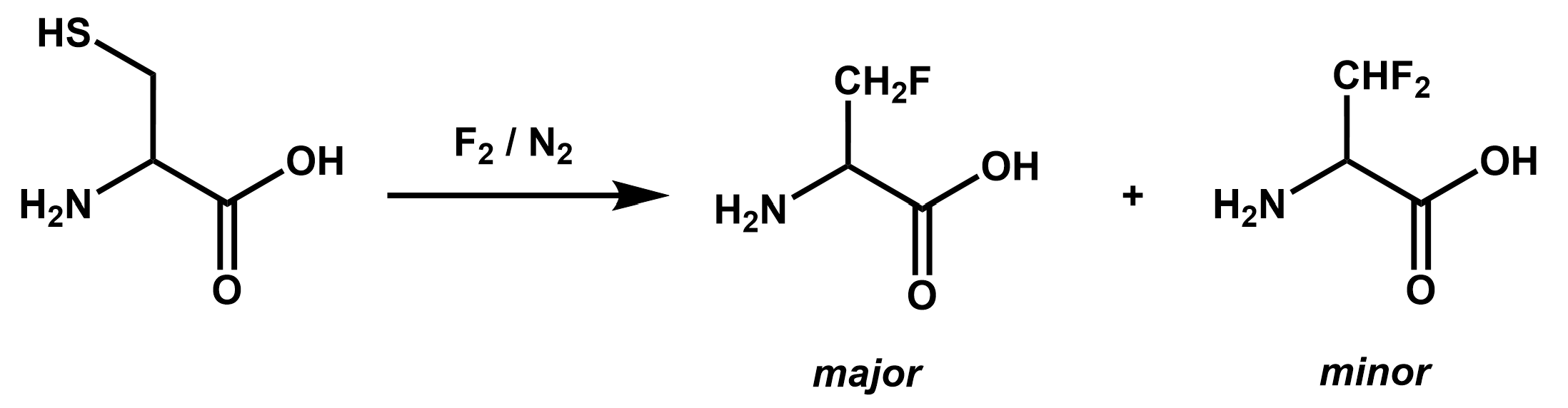

3-Fluoroalanine, 3,3-difluoroalanine, and 3,3,3-trifluoroalanine can also be synthesised by treating alanine directly with UV-irradiated trifluoromethyl hypofluorite.

Optically pure 3-fluoroalanines can be produced through an oxazolidinone intermediate that can be obtained from L- or D-serine. Enzymatic synthesis of alanine with varying degrees of fluorination has been reported, using substrates such as 3-fluoropyruvate and a serine-derivatised sulfamidate.

== Applications ==
3-Fluoroalanine produced using the radioactive ^{18}F isotope has potential applications in Positron Emission Tomography as a radioactive tracer. The D-enantiomer has shown promise in differentiating between bacterial infection and sterile inflammation. A deuterated L-enantiomer expressed enhanced tumour uptake, warranting further biological investigation into its use as a cancer imaging agent.

3-Fluoroalanine is described as unstable and generally unsuitable for peptide synthesis. Under basic conditions, it is prone to dehydrofluorination, and the proximity of the fluorine substituent to the amine group reduces the nucleophilicity of the latter. However, it has been successfully used in developing analogues to the immunosuppressant Cyclosporin A. Additionally, dehydrofluorination of 3-fluoroalanine produces a double-bond, providing a route for further amino acid functionalisation. In 2015, the synthesis of N-Fmoc-protected 3-fluoroalanine grants viable routes towards incorporating fluorinated alanine probes within synthetic peptides.

== Related compounds ==
While fluoroalanine may refer to various isomers of 3-fluoroalanine, other functional analogues and isotopologues are of note.

=== Isomers ===
- 2-Fluoroalanine: a major biliary metabolite of fluorouracil, a chemotherapy drug.

=== Functional analogues and derivatives ===
- 3,3-Difluoroalanine: Difluorinated alanine with similar residue hydrophobicity to that of isoleucine.
- 3,3,3-Trifluoroalanine: Trifluorinated alanine that expresses properties of a suicide inhibitor for alanine racemases.
- 3,3,3-Trifluoroalanine N-carboxyanhydride: A cyclic anhydride of trifluorinated alanine investigated for use as a monomer in homo- and co-polymerisations.

=== Isotopologues ===
- Fludalanine (3-Fluoro-D-alanine-2-d): 3-fluoroalanine that has been deuterated at C2. This molecule was a promising antibiotic candidate that inhibited alanine racemases, which are integral to bacterial cell wall synthesis. At high concentrations, bacteria use fludalanine itself for cell wall synthesis. The compound ultimately failed clinical trials due to toxic metabolites.
