= Aspartate 4-decarboxylase =

Class of enzymes

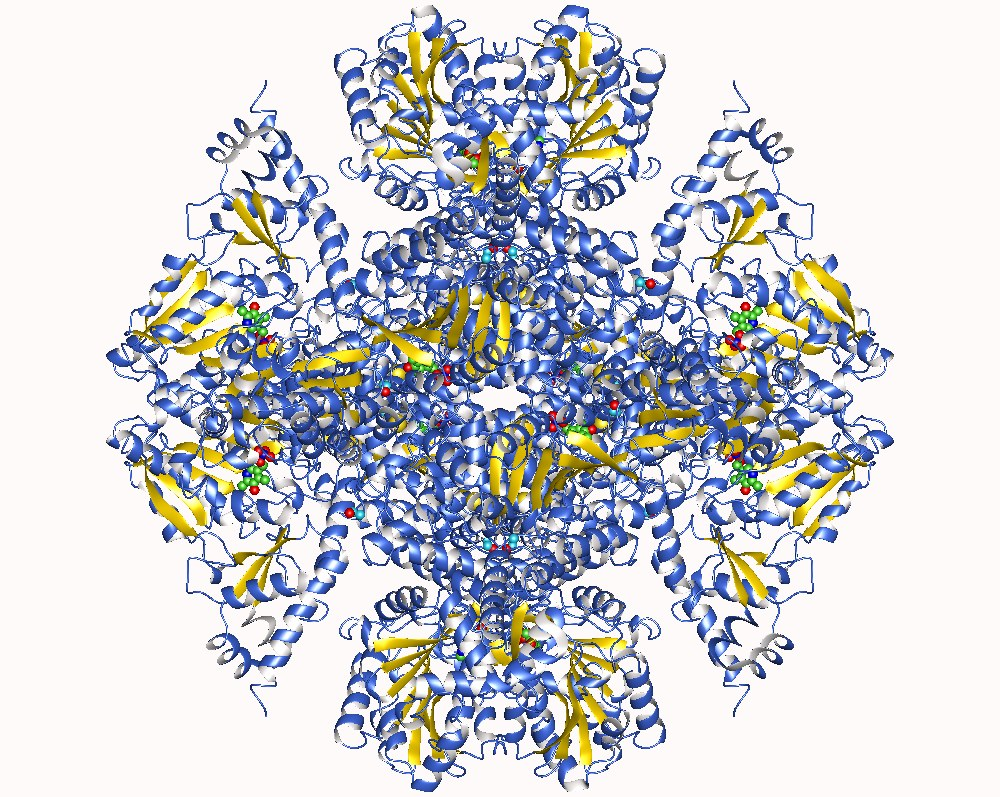
- Aspartate beta-decarboxylase dodekamer, Comamonas testosteroni

Identifiers
- EC no.: 4.1.1.12
- CAS no.: 9024-57-1

Databases
- BRENDA: enzyme data
- ExPASy: NiceZyme view
- KEGG: enzyme entry
- MetaCyc: metabolic pathway
- Rhea: reactions
- PDB structures: RCSB PDB PDBe PDBsum
- Gene Ontology: AmiGO / QuickGO
Search
- PMC: articles
- PubMed: articles
- NCBI: proteins

Aspartate 4-decarboxylase (EC 4.1.1.12) is an enzyme characterised from Achromobacter and Pseudomonas that catalyzes the decarboxylation of aspartic acid to alanine and carbon dioxide:

aspartic acid
CO_{2}
alanine

This reaction is the basis of an industrial synthesis of L-alanine, and speciality products derived from alanine. The enzyme uses pyridoxal phosphate as a cofactor and can also convert L-cysteine sulphinic acid to alanine.

This enzyme is a lyase, specifically a carboxy-lyase, which cleave carbon-carbon bonds. The systematic name of this enzyme class is L-aspartate 4-carboxy-lyase (L-alanine-forming). Other names in use include desulfinase, aminomalonic decarboxylase, aspartate beta-decarboxylase, aspartate omega-decarboxylase, aspartic omega-decarboxylase, aspartic beta-decarboxylase, L-aspartate beta-decarboxylase, cysteine sulfinic desulfinase, L-cysteine sulfinate acid desulfinase, and L-aspartate 4-carboxy-lyase.
