= Biodegradable Packaging for Environment =

Biodegradable Packaging for Environment Public Co. Ltd., (BPE) is a Thai company. It manufactures biodegradable, compostable, therefore disposable tableware products. The products primarily are made from bagasse, a natural product made from the pulp of sugar cane after the sugar has been extracted. From its founding in 2005 until 2012 BPE branded its products as "Biochanaoy". In 2012 it renamed its brand, "Gracz".

== History ==
Many food containers and packaging products can often times release chemicals and substances into food that can be harmful when consumed. BPE, now formally known as Gracz is a company founded in January 2005 by Dr Weerachat Kittirattanapaiboon, MD. The company produces safe alternatives to containers and packaging products that do not contaminate food. The company headquarters is located in Bangkok with its industrial facilities in Chai Nat Province, approximately 188 km north of Bangkok. Major shareholders are the MDS Group, the National Innovation Agency of the Ministry of Science and Technology, and the Office of Small and Medium Enterprises Promotion (OSMEP) of the Ministry of Industry.

== Products ==
BPE manufactures two lines of take-out food containers and one line of non-food industrial packaging containers."Gracz" is produced using natural plant fibers as opposed to wood fibers. The products are free of cancer causing agents and are biodegradable within 6 weeks in the ground. All products are nontoxic with a shelf life of 5 years.

- Gracz Classic: A family of over 50 tableware items ranging from cups, bowls, plates, and clamshell containers to cutlery. The items, white in color, are made from bagasse exclusively.
- Gracz Simple: A family of tableware items, cream colored, made from bagasse and bamboo.
- Non-food containers: BPE manufactures industrial packaging products.

== Operations ==
The company currently has over 400 employees and hopes to double production to five million pieces per day in 2017. BPE earns 70 percent of its total annual revenue from exports to developed countries. In 2017 it affirmed its intention to penetrate its home market of Thailand and the other nine ASEAN nations under the GracZ label. It also sells private label goods to brands such as Studio, Walmart, and Lidl Stiftung & Co.

== Environmental concerns ==
The firm is the only company in Thailand to be awarded the Thailand Board of Investment (BOI) Privilege in the environmental category. The factory energy runs completely on LPG and steam, and all wastes from the production process are recycled. Bagasse is a natural product, Biodegradable in 45 days in a landfill or in nature. Bagasse products can be frozen, can go to an oven, and are microwavable. The company's products are UV pasteurized, and are safe for food contact.

It is essential for the state of our environment to produce and use products with an eco-friendly life cycle. The key to sustainable packaging is a broad-range approach encompassing economic, social, and environmental concerns in conjunction with efficient product design and material. Gracz products all support an eco-friendly life cycle, beginning with sugar factories that produce bagasse after the sugarcane stalks have been used. Gracz products are 100% decomposable. They are designed to be disposed of by burying them in the ground, where they will eventually be transformed into fertilizer for plants through the biodegradable process. Environmental life cycle assessment (LCA) is being developed and utilized worldwide as a way to manage the environmental effects of the manufacturing process. Lifecycle assessment is a new and developing scientific discipline that involves two stages. The first stage involves an accounting process accessing the inventory of all inputs and outputs regarding energy and material. The second stage consists of an evaluation of the effects of the product on the environment. Through this assessment the lifecycle of a product is evaluated and assessed based on its environmental impact.

== Awards ==
- "TOP Ten Innovative Business Award": 2006

- "Good Design Award": 2009

- "Prime Minister Export Award": 2009

- "BRC/IOP and Din Certco Certificate": 2011

-"7 Innovation Award": 2014

== Mission ==
The company's mission is to invent new products that meet the need of the consumers, to extend marketing distribution across all channels, and to promote awareness of eco friendly packaging. Consumers play a major role in the overall growth of eco-friendly packaging. Studies show that attributes such as price and quality are more important to consumers than the environmental benefits of certain packaging. Raising awareness to consumers regarding the overall benefits of environmentally friendly alternatives to packaging is part of the mission to increase sales.
