= Alanine =

Α-amino acid that is used in the biosynthesis of proteins

- Alanine in non-ionic form Skeletal formula of L-alanine (neutral form)

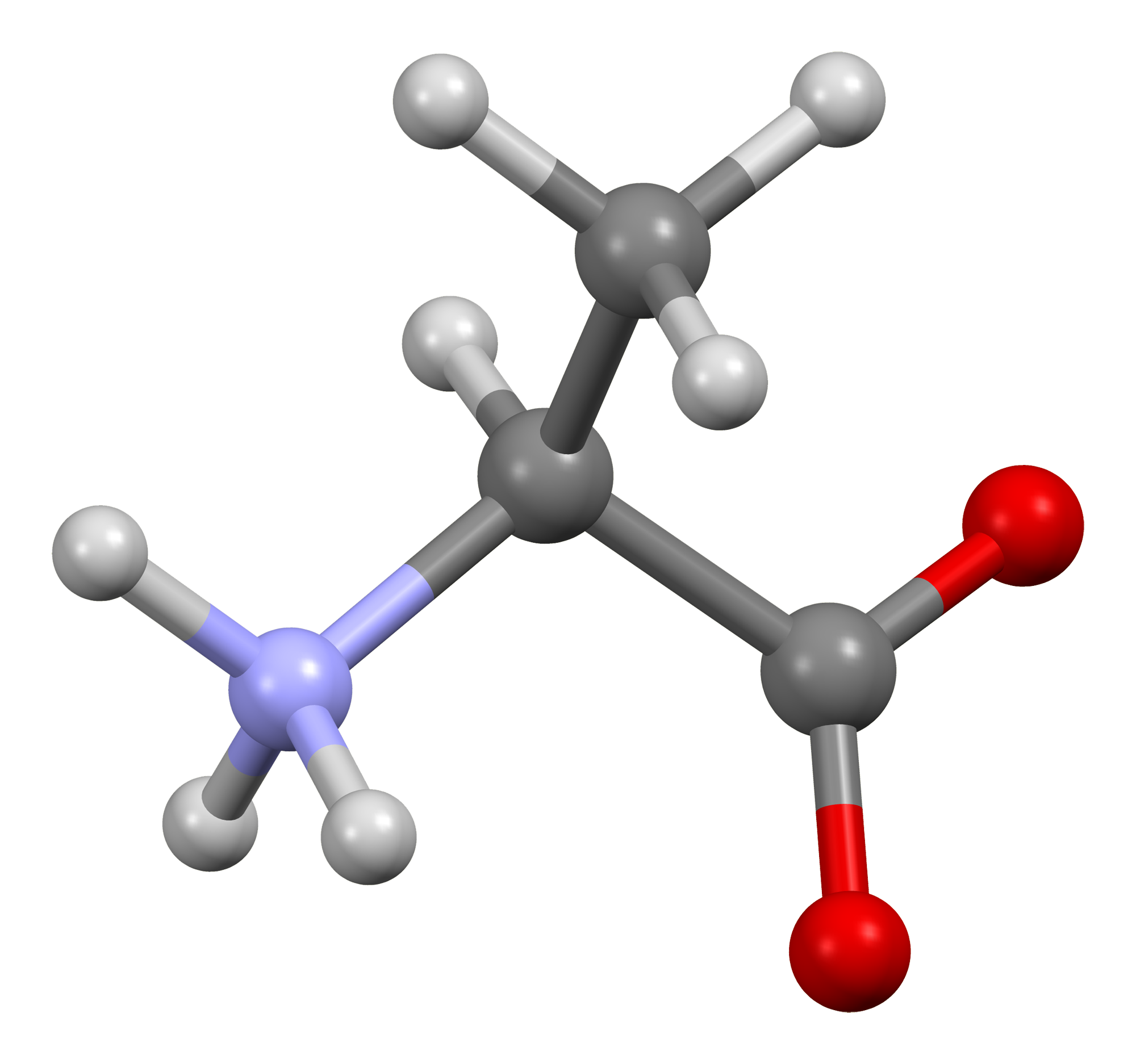
Ball-and-stick model (zwitterionic form)
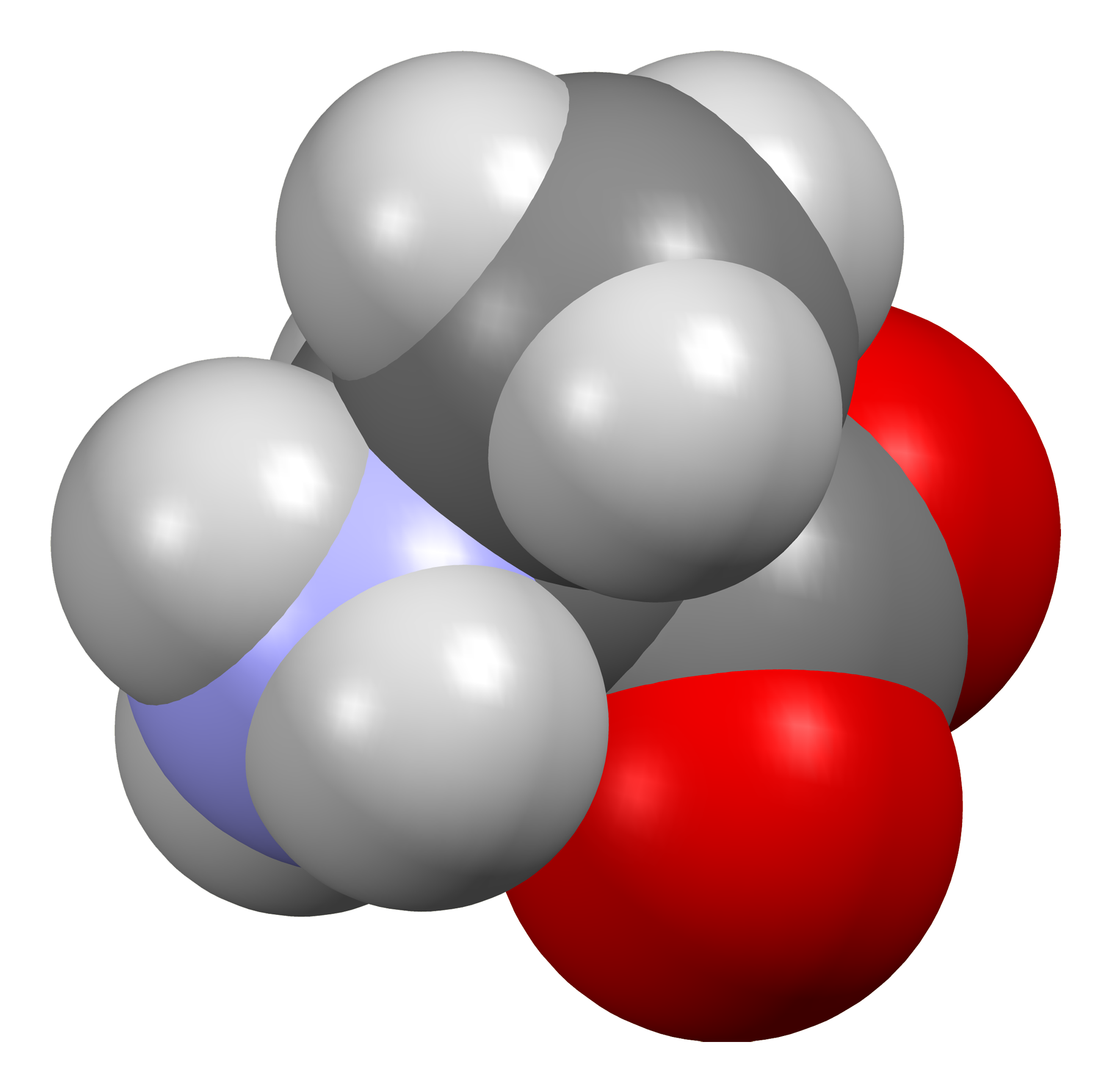
Space-filling model (zwitterionic form)

Names
- IUPAC name Alanine
- Systematic IUPAC name 2-Aminopropanoic acid
- Other names Alanic acid Alaninic acid 2-Aminopropionic acid

Identifiers
CAS Number	L: 56-41-7; D/L: 302-72-7; D: 338-69-2
3D model (JSmol)	L: Interactive image; D: Interactive image; L Zwitterion: Interactive image; D Zwitterion: Interactive image
Beilstein Reference	1720248
ChEBI	L: CHEBI:16977; D/L: CHEBI:16449; D: CHEBI:15570
ChEMBL	L: ChEMBL279597
ChemSpider	L: 5735; D/L: 582; D: 64234
DrugBank	L: DB00160
ECHA InfoCard	100.000.249
EC Number	L: 206-126-4
Gmelin Reference	49628
IUPHAR/BPS	L: 720
KEGG	L: C00041; D/L: C01401; D: C00133
PubChem CID	L: 5950; D/L: 602; D: 71080
UNII	L: OF5P57N2ZX; D/L: 1FU7983T0U; D: E3UDS4613U
CompTox Dashboard (EPA)	L: DTXSID20873899
- InChI: InChI=1S/C3H7NO2/c1-2(4)3(5)6/h2H,4H2,1H3,(H,5,6)/t2-/m0/s1 Key: QNAYBMKLOCPYGJ-REOHCLBHSA-N; D/L: Key: QNAYBMKLOCPYGJ-UHFFFAOYSA-N; D: Key: QNAYBMKLOCPYGJ-UWTATZPHSA-N
- SMILES: L: C[C@@H](C(=O)O)N; D: C[C@H](C(=O)O)N; L Zwitterion: C[C@@H](C(=O)[O-])[NH3+]; D Zwitterion: C[C@H](C(=O)[O-])[NH3+]

Properties
Chemical formula	C_{3}H_{7}NO_{2}
Molar mass	89.094 g·mol^{−1}
Appearance	white powder
Density	1.424 g/cm^{3}
Melting point	258 °C (496 °F; 531 K) (sublimes)
Solubility in water	167.2 g/L (25 °C)
log P	−0.68
Acidity (pK_{a})	2.34 (carboxyl; H_{2}O); 9.87 (amino; H_{2}O)
Magnetic susceptibility (χ)	−50.5×10^{−6} cm^{3}/mol

Related compounds
Related compounds	Fluoroalanine

Supplementary data page
- Alanine (data page)
- Except where otherwise noted, data are given for materials in their standard state (at 25 °C [77 °F], 100 kPa). Infobox references

Spin view of ball-stick model

Alanine (symbol Ala or A), or α-alanine, is an α-amino acid that is used in the biosynthesis of proteins. It contains an amine group and a carboxylic acid group, both attached to the central carbon atom which also carries a methyl group side chain. Consequently it is classified as a non-polar, aliphatic α-amino acid.

Under biological conditions, alanine exists in its zwitterionic form with its amine group protonated (as −NH^{+}_{3}) and its carboxyl group deprotonated (as −CO^{−}_{2}). Alanine is encoded by all codons starting with GC (GCU, GCC, GCA, and GCG). The L-isomer of alanine (left-handed) is the one that is incorporated into proteins. L-alanine is second only to L-leucine in rate of occurrence, accounting for 7.8% of the primary structure in a sample of 1,150 proteins. The right-handed form, D-alanine, occurs in peptides in some bacterial cell walls (in peptidoglycan) and in some peptide antibiotics, and occurs in the tissues of many crustaceans and molluscs as an osmolyte.

Alanine is not an essential amino acid in humans because it can be synthesized metabolically and does not need to be present in the diet. However hypoalaninemia (alanine deficiency) is possible under certain conditions such as ketotic hypoglycemia.

== History and etymology ==
Alanine was first synthesized in 1850 when Adolph Strecker combined acetaldehyde and ammonia with hydrogen cyanide. The amino acid was named Alanin in German, in reference to aldehyde, with the interfix -an- for ease of pronunciation, the German ending -in used in chemical compounds being analogous to English -ine.

== Structure ==
Alanine is an aliphatic amino acid, because the side-chain connected to the α-carbon atom is a methyl group (-CH_{3}). Alanine is the simplest α-amino acid after glycine. The methyl side-chain of alanine is non-reactive and is therefore hardly ever directly involved in protein function. Alanine is a nonessential amino acid, meaning it can be manufactured by the human body, and does not need to be obtained through the diet. Alanine is found in a wide variety of foods, but is particularly concentrated in meats.

== Sources ==
=== Biosynthesis ===
Alanine can be synthesized from pyruvate and branched-chain amino acids such as valine, leucine, and isoleucine.

Alanine is produced by reductive amination of pyruvate, a two-step process. In the first step, α-ketoglutarate, ammonia and NADH are converted by glutamate dehydrogenase to glutamate, NAD^{+} and water. In the second step, the amino group of the newly formed glutamate is transferred to pyruvate by an aminotransferase enzyme, regenerating the α-ketoglutarate, and converting the pyruvate to alanine. The net result is that pyruvate and ammonia are converted to alanine, consuming one reducing equivalent. Because transamination reactions are readily reversible and pyruvate is present in all cells, alanine can be easily formed and thus has close links to metabolic pathways such as glycolysis, gluconeogenesis, and the citric acid cycle.

=== Chemical synthesis ===
L-Alanine is produced industrially by decarboxylation of L-aspartate by the action of aspartate 4-decarboxylase. Fermentation routes to L-alanine are complicated by alanine racemase.

Racemic alanine can be prepared by the condensation of acetaldehyde with ammonium chloride in the presence of sodium cyanide by the Strecker reaction,

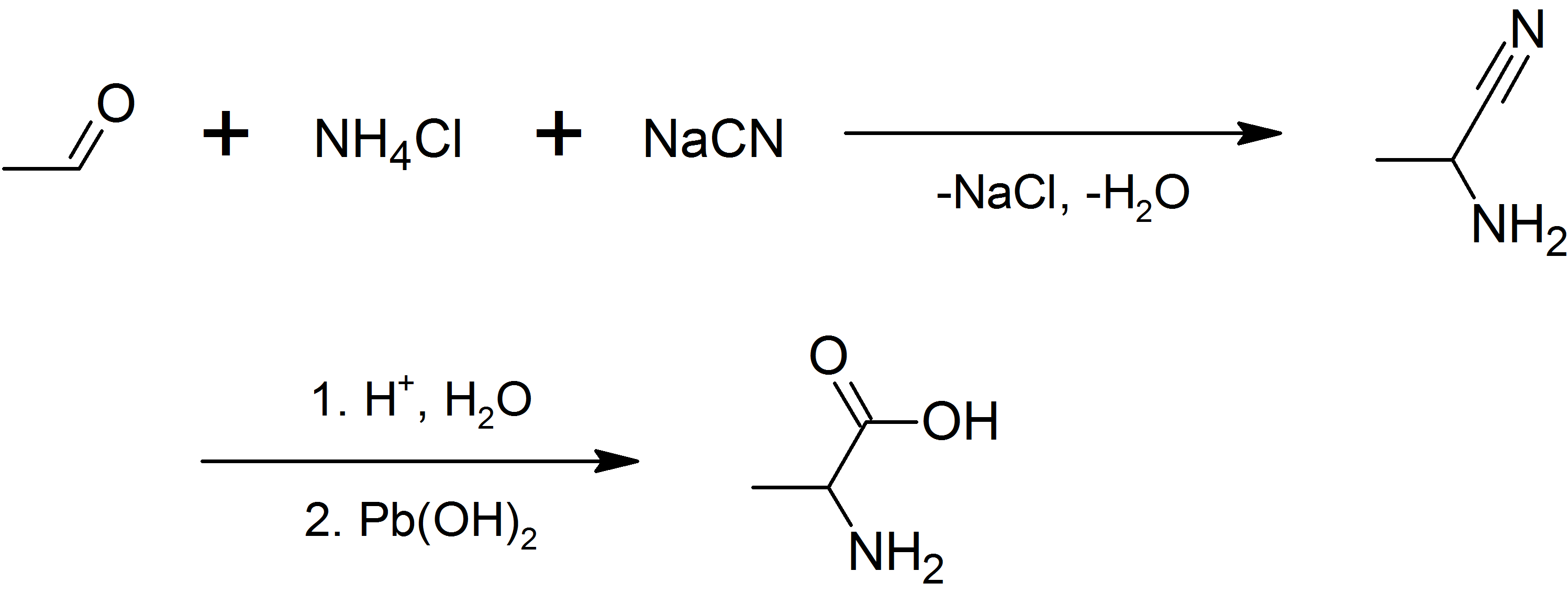

or by the ammonolysis of 2-bromopropanoic acid.

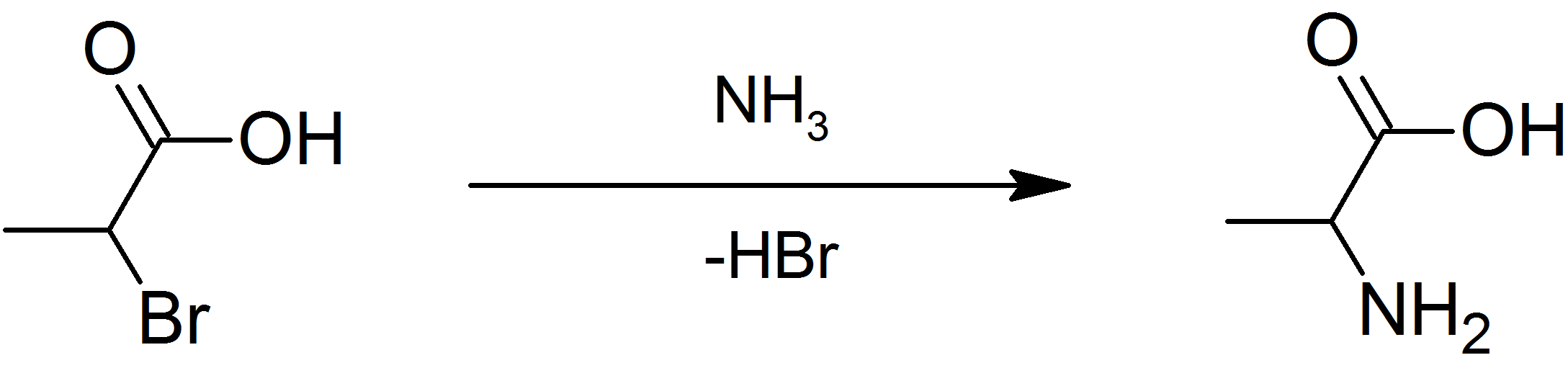

=== Degradation ===
Alanine is broken down by oxidative deamination, the inverse reaction of the reductive amination reaction described above, catalyzed by the same enzymes. The direction of the process is largely controlled by the relative concentration of the substrates and products of the reactions involved.

== Alanine world hypothesis ==
Alanine is one of the twenty canonical α-amino acids used as building blocks (monomers) for the ribosome-mediated biosynthesis of proteins. Alanine is believed to be one of the earliest amino acids to be included in the genetic code standard repertoire. On the basis of this fact the "alanine world" hypothesis was proposed. This hypothesis explains the evolutionary choice of amino acids in the repertoire of the genetic code from a chemical point of view. In this model the selection of monomers (i.e. amino acids) for ribosomal protein synthesis is rather limited to those alanine derivatives that are suitable for building α-helix or β-sheet secondary structural elements. Dominant secondary structures in life as we know it are α-helices and β-sheets and most canonical amino acids can be regarded as chemical derivatives of alanine. Therefore, most canonical amino acids in proteins can be exchanged with alanine by point mutations while the secondary structure remains intact. The fact that alanine mimics the secondary structure preferences of the majority of the encoded amino acids is practically exploited in alanine scanning mutagenesis. In addition, classical X-ray crystallography often employs the polyalanine-backbone model to determine three-dimensional structures of proteins using molecular replacement—a model-based phasing method.

== Physiological function ==
=== Glucose–alanine cycle ===
In mammals, alanine plays a key role in glucose–alanine cycle between tissues and liver. In muscle and other tissues that degrade amino acids for fuel, amino groups are collected in the form of glutamate by transamination. Glutamate can then transfer its amino group to pyruvate, a product of muscle glycolysis, through the action of alanine aminotransferase, forming alanine and α-ketoglutarate. The alanine enters the bloodstream, and is transported to the liver. The alanine aminotransferase reaction takes place in reverse in the liver, where the regenerated pyruvate is used in gluconeogenesis, forming glucose which returns to the muscles through the circulation system. Glutamate in the liver enters mitochondria and is broken down by glutamate dehydrogenase into α-ketoglutarate and ammonium, which in turn participates in the urea cycle to form urea which is excreted through the kidneys.

The glucose–alanine cycle enables pyruvate and glutamate to be removed from muscle and safely transported to the liver. Once there, pyruvate is used to regenerate glucose, after which the glucose returns to muscle to be metabolized for energy: this moves the energetic burden of gluconeogenesis to the liver instead of the muscle, and all available ATP in the muscle can be devoted to muscle contraction. It is a catabolic pathway, and relies upon protein breakdown in the muscle tissue. Whether and to what extent it occurs in non-mammals is unclear.

=== Link to diabetes ===
Alterations in the alanine cycle that increase the levels of serum alanine aminotransferase (ALT) are linked to the development of type II diabetes.

== Chemical properties ==
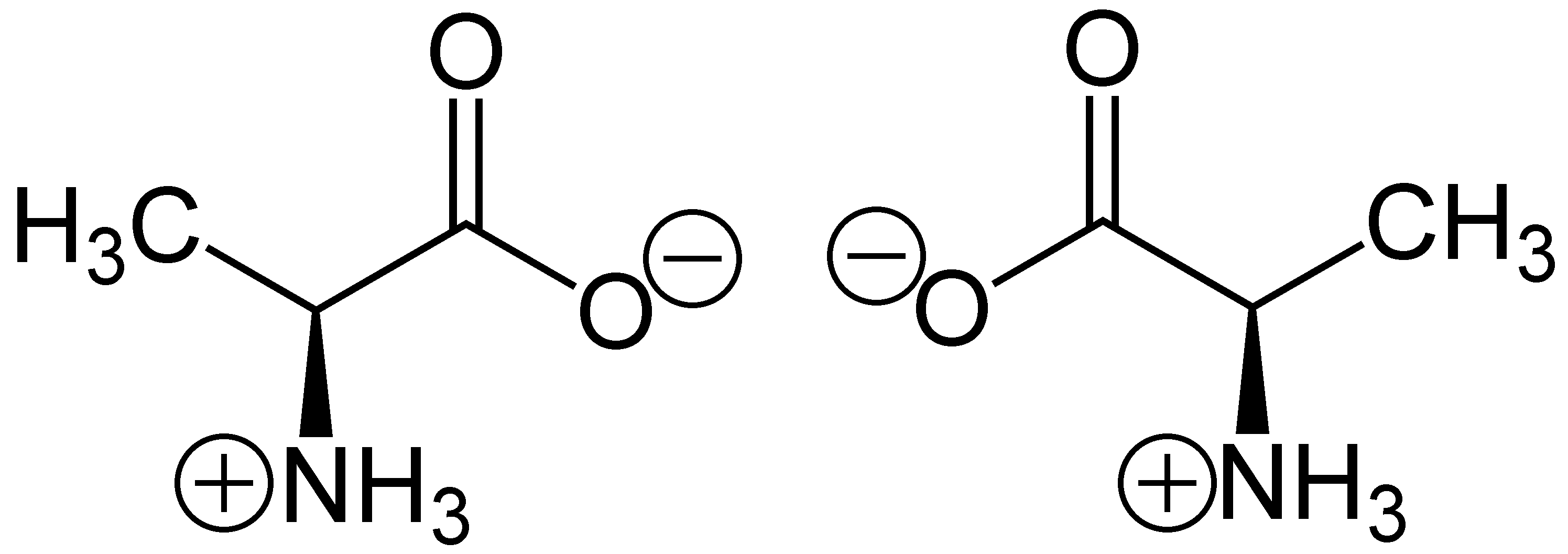
(S)-Alanine (left) and (R)-alanine (right) in zwitterionic form at neutral pH

Alanine is useful in loss of function experiments with respect to phosphorylation. Some techniques involve creating a library of genes, each of which has a point mutation at a different position in the area of interest, sometimes even every position in the whole gene: this is called "scanning mutagenesis". The simplest method, and the first to have been used, is so-called alanine scanning, where every position in turn is mutated to alanine.

Hydrogenation of alanine gives the amino alcohol alaninol, which is a useful chiral building block.

=== Free radical ===
The deamination of an alanine molecule produces the free radical CH_{3}C^{•}HCO_{2}^{−}. Deamination can be induced in solid or aqueous alanine by radiation that causes homolytic cleavage of the carbon–nitrogen bond.

This property of alanine is used in dosimetric measurements in radiotherapy. When normal alanine is irradiated, the radiation causes certain alanine molecules to become free radicals, and, as these radicals are stable, the free radical content can later be measured by electron paramagnetic resonance in order to find out how much radiation the alanine was exposed to. This is considered to be a biologically relevant measure of the amount of radiation damage that living tissue would suffer under the same radiation exposure. Radiotherapy treatment plans can be delivered in test mode to alanine pellets, which can then be measured to check that the intended pattern of radiation dose is correctly delivered by the treatment system.
