= Cori cycle =

Series of interconnected biochemical reactions

Cori cycle

The Cori cycle (also known as the lactic acid cycle), named after its discoverers, Carl Ferdinand Cori and Gerty Cori, is a metabolic pathway in which lactate, produced by anaerobic glycolysis in muscles, is transported to the liver and converted to glucose, which then returns to the muscles and is cyclically metabolized back to lactate.

== Process ==
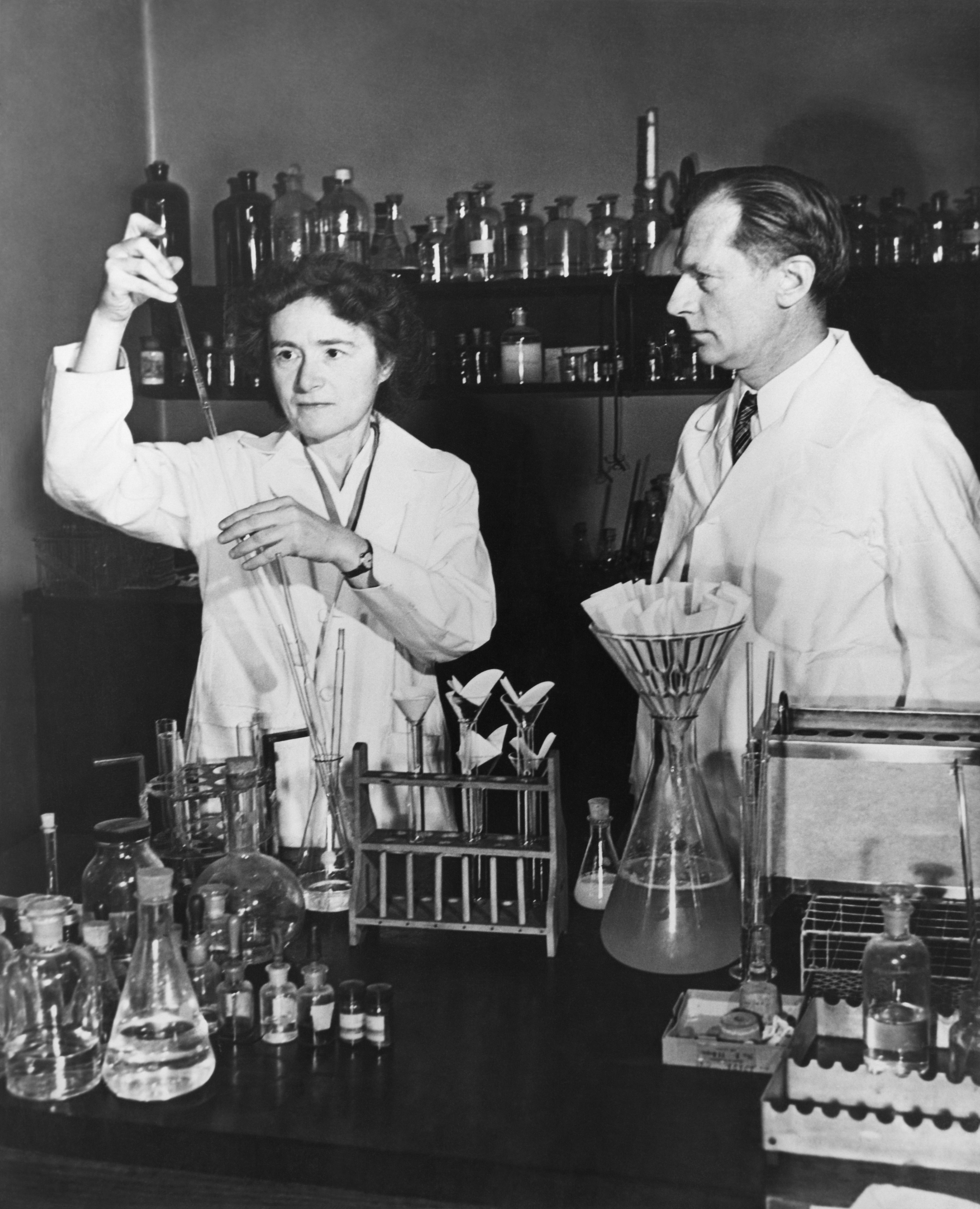
Carl Cori and Gerty Cori jointly won the 1947 Nobel Prize in Physiology or Medicine, for their discovery of the course of the catalytic conversion of glycogen, of which the Cori cycle is a part.

Muscular activity requires ATP, which is provided by the breakdown of glycogen in the skeletal muscles. The breakdown of glycogen, known as glycogenolysis, releases glucose in the form of glucose 1-phosphate (G1P). The G1P is converted to G6P by phosphoglucomutase. G6P is readily fed into glycolysis, (or can go into the pentose phosphate pathway if G6P concentration is high) a process that provides ATP to the muscle cells as an energy source. During muscular activity, the store of ATP needs to be constantly replenished. When the supply of oxygen is sufficient, this energy comes from feeding pyruvate, one product of glycolysis, into the citric acid cycle, which ultimately generates ATP through oxygen-dependent oxidative phosphorylation.

When oxygen supply is insufficient, typically during intense muscular activity, energy must be released through anaerobic metabolism. Lactic acid fermentation converts pyruvate to lactate by lactate dehydrogenase. Most importantly, fermentation regenerates NAD^{+}, maintaining its concentration so additional glycolysis reactions can occur. The fermentation step oxidizes the NADH produced by glycolysis back to NAD^{+}, transferring two electrons from NADH to reduce pyruvate into lactate. (Refer to the main articles on glycolysis and fermentation for the details.)

Instead of accumulating inside the muscle cells, lactate produced by anaerobic fermentation is taken up by the liver. This initiates the other half of the Cori cycle. In the liver, gluconeogenesis occurs. From an intuitive perspective, gluconeogenesis reverses both glycolysis and fermentation by converting lactate first into pyruvate, and finally back to glucose. The glucose is then supplied to the muscles through the bloodstream; it is ready to be fed into further glycolysis reactions. If muscle activity has stopped, the glucose is used to replenish the supplies of glycogen through glycogenesis.

Overall, the glycolysis steps of the cycle produce 2 ATP molecules at a cost of 6 ATP molecules consumed in the gluconeogenesis steps. Each iteration of the cycle must be maintained by a net consumption of 4 ATP molecules. As a result, the cycle cannot be sustained indefinitely. The intensive consumption of ATP molecules in the Cori cycle shifts the metabolic burden from the muscles to the liver.

== Significance ==
The cycle's importance is based on preventing lactic acidosis during anaerobic conditions in the muscle. However, normally, before this happens, the lactic acid is moved out of the muscles and into the liver.

Additionally, this cycle is important in ATP production, an energy source, during muscle exertion. The end of muscle exertion allows the Cori cycle to function more effectively. This repays the oxygen debt so both the electron transport chain and citric acid cycle can produce energy at optimum effectiveness.

The Cori cycle is a much more important source of substrate for gluconeogenesis than food. The contribution of Cori cycle lactate to overall glucose production increases with fasting duration before plateauing. Specifically, after 12, 20, and 40 hours of fasting by human volunteers, gluconeogenesis accounts for 41%, 71%, and 92% of glucose production, but the contribution of Cori cycle lactate to gluconeogenesis is 18%, 35%, and 36%, respectively. The remaining glucose production comes from protein breakdown, muscle glycogen, and glycerol from lipolysis.

The drug metformin can cause lactic acidosis in patients with kidney failure because metformin inhibits the hepatic gluconeogenesis of the Cori cycle, particularly the mitochondrial respiratory chain complex 1. The buildup of lactate and its substrates for lactate production, pyruvate and alanine, lead to excess lactate. Normally, the excess acid that is the result of the inhibition of the mitochondrial chain complex would be cleared by the kidneys, but in patients with kidney failure, the kidneys cannot handle the excess acid. A common misconception posits that lactate is the agent responsible for the acidosis, but lactate is a conjugate base, being mostly ionised at physiologic pH, and serves as a marker of associated acid production rather than being its cause.

== See also ==
- Alanine cycle
- Citric acid cycle
