= Cahill cycle =

Metabolic pathway for transport of energy into and removal of ammonia from muscles

Alanine and Cori cycles

The Cahill cycle, also known as the alanine cycle or glucose-alanine cycle, is the series of reactions in which amino groups and carbons from muscle are transported to the liver. It is quite similar to the Cori cycle in the cycling of nutrients between skeletal muscle and the liver. When muscles degrade amino acids for energy needs, the resulting nitrogen is transaminated to pyruvate to form alanine. This is performed by the enzyme alanine transaminase (ALT), which converts L-glutamate and pyruvate into α-ketoglutarate and L-alanine. The resulting L-alanine is shuttled to the liver where the nitrogen enters the urea cycle and the pyruvate is used to make glucose.

The Cahill cycle is less productive than the Cori cycle, which uses lactate, since a byproduct of energy production from alanine is production of urea. Removal of the urea is energy-dependent, requiring four "high-energy" phosphate bonds (3 ATP hydrolyzed to 2 ADP and one AMP), thus the net ATP produced is less than that found in the Cori cycle. However, unlike in the Cori cycle, NADH is conserved because lactate is not formed. This allows for it to be oxidized via the electron transport chain.

Studies have demonstrated a clinical relevance of the Cahill cycle in the development of new treatments for liver associated diseases and cancers.

== Reactions ==
Because skeletal muscle is unable to utilize the urea cycle to safely dispose of ammonium ions generated in the breakdown of branch chain amino acids, it must get rid of it in a different way. To do so, the ammonium is combined with free α-ketoglutarate via a transamination reaction in the cell, yielding glutamate and α-keto acid. Alanine aminotransaminase (ALT), also known as Glutamic-pyruvic transaminase (GPT), then coverts glutamate back into α-ketoglutarate, this time transferring the ammonium to pyruvate resulting from glycolysis, forming free alanine. The alanine amino acid acts as a shuttle - it leaves the cell, entering the blood stream and traveling to hepatocytes in the liver, where essentially this entire process is reversed. Alanine undergoes a transamination reaction with free α-ketoglutarate to yield glutamate, which is then deaminated to form pyruvate and, ultimately, free ammonium ion. Hepatocytes are capable of metabolizing the toxic ammonium by the urea cycle, thus disposing of it safely. Having rid the muscle cells of the ammonium ion successfully, the cycle then provides the energy-deprived skeletal muscle cells with glucose. Pyruvate formed from the deamination of glutamate in the hepatocytes undergoes gluconeogenesis to form glucose, which can then enter the bloodstream and be shuttled to the skeletal muscle tissue, thus providing it with the energy source it needs.

The Cahill cycle requires the presence of alanine aminotransferase (alanine transaminase, ALT), which is restricted to tissues such as muscle, liver, and the intestine. Therefore, this pathway is used instead of the Cori cycle only when an aminotransferase is present, when there is a need to transfer ammonia to the liver and when the body is in a state of catabolism (muscle breakdown).

== Function ==
The Cahill cycle ultimately serves as a method of ridding the muscle tissue of the toxic ammonium ion, as well as indirectly providing glucose to energy-deprived muscle tissue. Under long periods of fasting, skeletal muscle can be degraded for use as an energy source to supplement the glucose being produced from the breakdown of glycogen. The breakdown of branch chain amino acids yields a carbon skeleton utilized for energy purposes, as well as free ammonium ions. However, its presence and physiological significance in non-mammalian land vertebrates is unclear. For example although some fish use alanine as a nitrogen carrier, the cycle is unlikely to take place due to a slower glucose turnover rate and lower release of alanine from exercising muscle tissue.

The alanine cycle also serves other purposes, such as the recycling of carbon skeletons in skeletal muscle and the liver, and participation in the transport of ammonium to the liver and conversion into urea.

Studies have demonstrated that the glucose-alanine cycle may play a direct role in regulation of hepatic (liver) mitochondrial oxidation, particularly during periods of extended fasting. Hepatic mitochondrial oxidation is a key process in the metabolism of glucose and fatty acids, involving the Citric Acid Cycle and oxidative phosphorylation, for the generation of ATP. Understanding the factors that influence hepatic mitochondrial oxidation are of great interest due to its function in mediating diseases such as Non-Alcoholic Fatty Liver Disease (NAFLD), Non-Alcoholic steatohepatitis (NASH), and Type 2 Diabetes. A current active area of research is attempting to exploit the regulatory role of hepatic mitochondrial oxidation for the purpose of developing both targeted and non targeted therapeutics for such diseases. The glucose-alanine cycle may be one of these key factors. A study performed on both rodents and humans showed that decreased alanine turnover during a 60 hour period of fasting did correlate with a notable reduction in hepatic mitochondrial oxidation, as compared to subjects who underwent a 12 hour overnight fast. The rate of oxidative activity was quantified primarily by monitoring rates of Citrate Synthase flux (V_{CS} ), a critical enzyme in the process of mitochondrial oxidation. To confirm whether or not the glucose-alanine cycle has a causal relationship with the observed effect, a secondary group of patients, also subjected to the same fasting conditions, were subsequently injected with a dose of L-alanine. Post-infusion, the 60 hour fasted patients showed a marked increase in hepatic mitochondrial oxidation, confirming the relationship.

The glucose-alanine cycle may also be of significant clinical relevance in oncological (cancer) pathogenesis. A 2020 study explored the role of the glucose-alanine cycle in the metabolic reprogramming of Hepatocellular Carcinoma (HCC). HCC is the most common form of liver cancer and the third most common cause of cancer-related deaths worldwide. The search for alternative treatment options remains a lucrative area of research as current available therapeutics (surgery, radiotherapy, chemotherapy) generally have severe side effects and/or low success rates with HCC. One common characteristic of many novel alternative and/or supplementary treatments is the targeting of cellular metabolism of cancer cells, due to their general hyper-metabolic state which favors rapid growth and proliferation. In conjunction with consuming glucose at a much more rapid rate than healthy cells, cancers cells heavily rely on amino acid metabolism to satisfy their avid nutritional needs. The researchers involved in this study speculated exogenous alanine, processed via the glucose-alanine cycle, to be one of the alternative energy sources for HCC cells in a nutrient deficient environment and that this dependency can be harnessed for targeted therapy. To demonstrate this experimentally, HCC cells were cultured in vitro in a nutrient poor media and then supplied with alanine. The alanine supplication was enough to promote HCC cell growth under those conditions- a phenomenon called metabolic reprogramming. Next, they performed a series of over expression and loss of function experiments and determined that specifically Glutamic Pyruvate Transaminase 1 (GPT1) is the GPT isomer primarily involved in alanine turnover in HCC cells, consistent with previous findings that GPT1 tends to be found in the liver. They proceeded by treating the metabolically reprogrammed HCC cells with Berberine, a naturally occurring inhibitor of GPT1; the observed affect was to curb ATP production and subsequently the growth of the alanine-supplied cancer cells. Their study demonstrated that components of the glucose-alanine cycle, particularly GPT1, may be a good choice as a target for alternative HCC therapies and that Berberine, as a plant- derived selective GPT1 inhibitor, has potential for use in one of these novel medicines. The concept of alanine as an alternative fuel for cancer cells was similarly demonstrated in other studies performed on pancreatic cancer cells.
