= Transaminase =

Class of enzymes

Aminotransferase
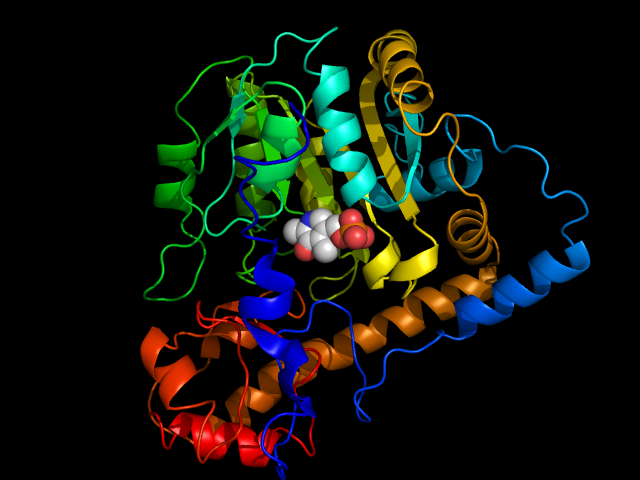
- Aspartate transaminase from E. coli with Pyridoxal 5' Phosphate cofactor

Identifiers
- Symbol: Aminotransferase
- Pfam: PF00155
- InterPro: IPR004839
- Membranome: 273
Available protein structures:
- PDB: IPR004839 PF00155 (ECOD; PDBsum)
- AlphaFold: IPR004839; PF00155

Transaminases or aminotransferases are enzymes that catalyze a transamination reaction between an amino acid and an α-keto acid. They are important in the synthesis of amino acids, which form proteins.

Two important transaminase enzymes, aspartate transaminase (AST), and alanine transaminase (ALT), are commonly used as indicators of liver and cardiac health.

== Function and mechanism ==
An amino acid contains an amino (NH_{2}) group. A keto acid contains a keto (=O) group. In transamination, the NH_{2} group on one molecule is exchanged with the =O group on the other molecule. The amino acid becomes a keto acid, and the keto acid becomes an amino acid.

Transaminases require the coenzyme pyridoxal phosphate, which is converted into pyridoxamine in the first half-reaction, when an amino acid is converted into a keto acid. Enzyme-bound pyridoxamine in turn reacts with pyruvate, oxaloacetate, or alpha-ketoglutarate, giving alanine, aspartic acid, or glutamic acid, respectively. Many transamination reactions occur in tissues, catalysed by transaminases specific for a particular amino/keto acid pair. The reactions are readily reversible, the direction being determined by which of the reactants are in excess. This reversibility can be exploited for synthetic chemistry applications to achieve the synthesis of valuable chiral amines. The specific enzymes are named from one of the reactant pairs, for example; the reaction between glutamic acid and pyruvic acid to make alpha ketoglutaric acid and alanine is called alanine transaminase and was originally called glutamic-pyruvic transaminase or GPT for short.

Tissue transaminase activities can be investigated by incubating a homogenate with various amino/keto acid pairs. Transamination is demonstrated if the corresponding new amino acid and keto acid are formed, as revealed by paper chromatography. Reversibility is demonstrated by using the complementary keto/amino acid pair as starting reactants. After chromatogram has been taken out of the solvent the chromatogram is then treated with ninhydrin to locate the spots.

Aminotransfer reaction between an amino acid and an alpha-keto acid. The amino (NH_{2}) group and the keto (=O) group are exchanged.

== Amino acid metabolism in animals ==
Animals must metabolize proteins to amino acids, at the expense of muscle tissue, when blood sugar is low. The preference of liver transaminases for oxaloacetate or alpha-ketoglutarate plays a key role in funneling nitrogen from amino acid metabolism to aspartate and glutamate for conversion to urea for excretion of nitrogen. In similar manner, in muscles the use of pyruvate for transamination gives alanine, which is carried by the bloodstream to the liver (the overall reaction being termed glucose-alanine cycle). Here other transaminases regenerate pyruvate, which provides a valuable precursor for gluconeogenesis. This alanine cycle is analogous to the Cori cycle, which allows anaerobic metabolism by muscles.

=== Diagnostic uses ===
The transaminase enzymes are important in the production of various amino acids, and measuring the concentrations of various transaminases in the blood is important in the diagnosing and tracking many diseases. For example, the presence of elevated transaminases can be an indicator of liver and cardiac damage. Two important transaminase enzymes are aspartate transaminase (AST), also known as serum glutamic oxaloacetic transaminase (SGOT); and alanine transaminase (ALT), also called alanine aminotransferase (ALAT) or serum glutamate-pyruvate transaminase (SGPT). These transaminases were discovered in 1954 and their clinical importance was described in 1955.

== See also ==
- Valproic acid - a GABA transaminase inhibitor
