= Methylhistidine =

Methylhistidine may refer to:

- 1-Methylhistidine
- 3-Methylhistidine
- N-Methylhistidine
- α-Methylhistidine

== See also ==
- C_{7}H_{11}N_{3}O_{2}
- Histidine methyl ester
