= Group III pyridoxal-dependent decarboxylases =

Class of enzymes

Orn/Lys/Arg decarboxylase, N-terminal domain
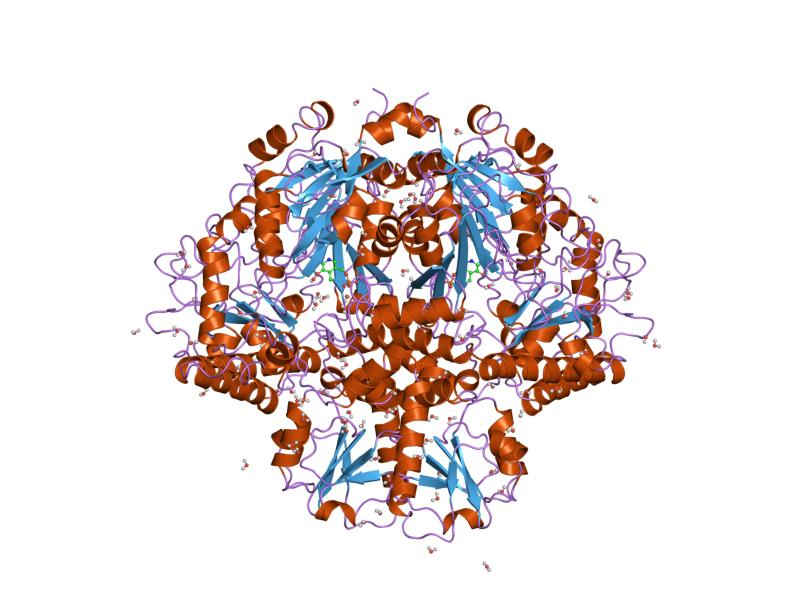
- crystallographic structure of a plp-dependent ornithine decarboxylase from lactobacillus 30a to 3.1 angstroms resolution

Identifiers
- Symbol: OKR_DC_1_N
- Pfam: PF03709
- Pfam clan: CL0304
- InterPro: IPR005308
- PROSITE: PDOC00585
- SCOP2: 1ord / SCOPe / SUPFAM
Available protein structures:
- PDB: IPR005308 PF03709 (ECOD; PDBsum)
- AlphaFold: IPR005308; PF03709

Orn/Lys/Arg decarboxylase, major domain
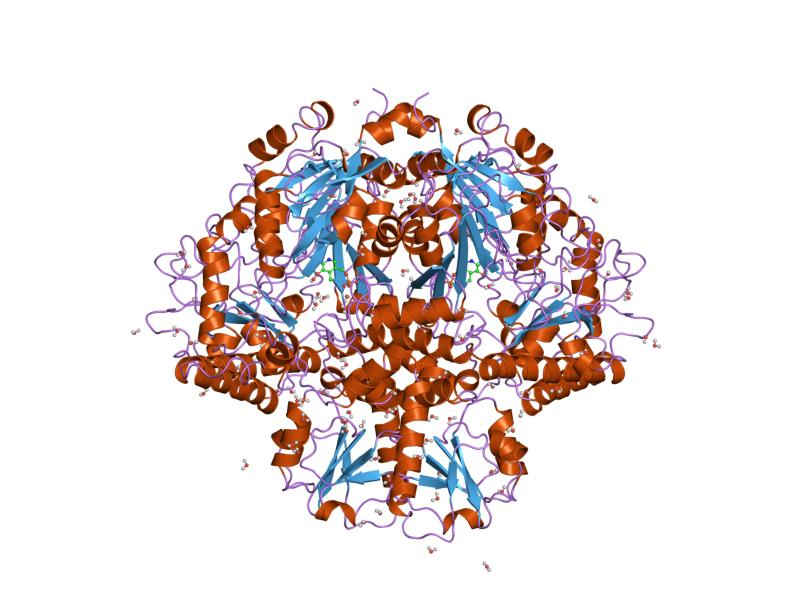
- crystallographic structure of a plp-dependent ornithine decarboxylase from lactobacillus 30a to 3.1 angstroms resolution

Identifiers
- Symbol: OKR_DC_1
- Pfam: PF01276
- Pfam clan: CL0061
- InterPro: IPR000310
- PROSITE: PDOC00585
- SCOP2: 1ord / SCOPe / SUPFAM
Available protein structures:
- PDB: IPR000310 PF01276 (ECOD; PDBsum)
- AlphaFold: IPR000310; PF01276

Orn/Lys/Arg decarboxylase, C-terminal domain
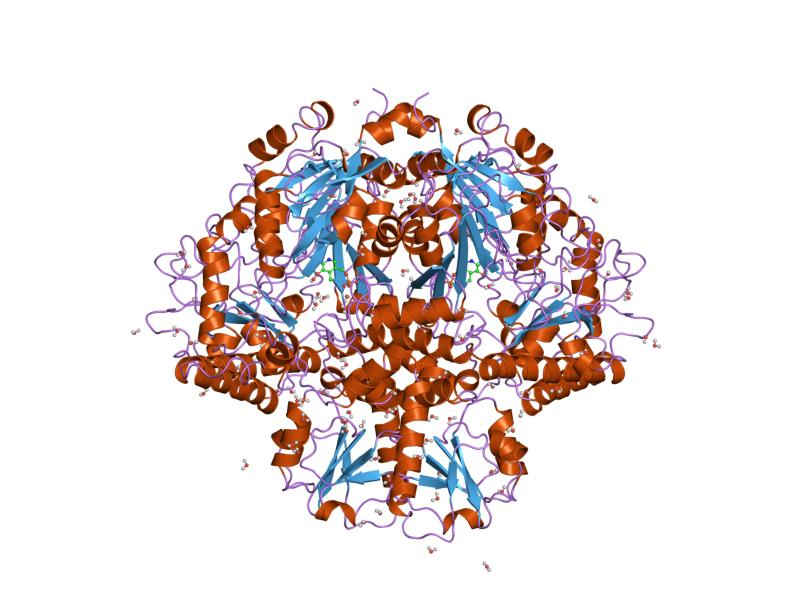
- crystallographic structure of a plp-dependent ornithine decarboxylase from lactobacillus 30a to 3.1 angstroms resolution

Identifiers
- Symbol: OKR_DC_1_C
- Pfam: PF03711
- InterPro: IPR008286
- PROSITE: PDOC00585
- SCOP2: 1ord / SCOPe / SUPFAM
Available protein structures:
- PDB: IPR008286 PF03711 (ECOD; PDBsum)
- AlphaFold: IPR008286; PF03711

In molecular biology, group III pyridoxal-dependent decarboxylases are a family of bacterial enzymes comprising ornithine decarboxylase EC 4.1.1.17, lysine decarboxylase EC 4.1.1.18 and arginine decarboxylase EC 4.1.1.19.

Pyridoxal-5'-phosphate-dependent amino acid decarboxylases can be divided into four groups based on amino acid sequence. Group III comprises prokaryotic ornithine and lysine decarboxylase and the prokaryotic biodegradative type of arginine decarboxylase.

== Structure ==
These enzymes consist of several conserved domains. The N-terminal domain has a flavodoxin-like fold, and is termed the "wing" domain because of its position in the overall 3D structure. Ornithine decarboxylase from Lactobacillus 30a (L30a OrnDC) is representative of the large, pyridoxal-5'-phosphate-dependent decarboxylases that act on lysine, arginine or ornithine. The crystal structure of the L30a OrnDC has been solved to 3.0 A resolution. Six dimers related by C6 symmetry compose the enzymatically active dodecamer (approximately 10^{6} Da). Each monomer of L30a OrnDC can be described in terms of five sequential folding domains. The amino-terminal domain, residues 1 to 107, consists of a five-stranded beta-sheet termed the "wing" domain. Two wing domains of each dimer project inward towards the centre of the dodecamer and contribute to dodecamer stabilisation. The major domain contains a conserved lysine residue, which is the site of attachment of the pyridoxal-phosphate group.

== See also ==
- Group I pyridoxal-dependent decarboxylases
- Group II pyridoxal-dependent decarboxylases
- Group IV pyridoxal-dependent decarboxylases
