= Group II pyridoxal-dependent decarboxylases =

Class of enzymes

Pyridoxal-dependent decarboxylase conserved domain
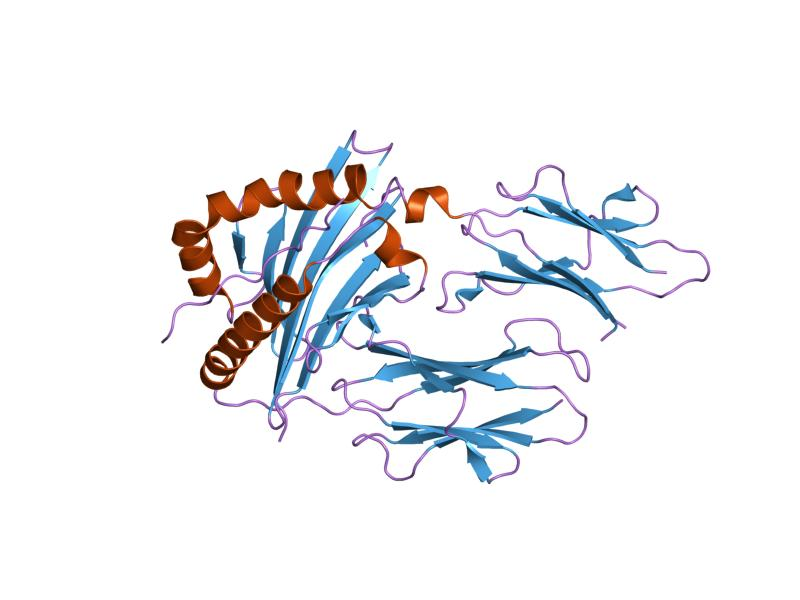
- crystal structure of the murine class ii allele i-a(g7) complexed with the glutamic acid decarboxylase (gad65) peptide 207-220

Identifiers
- Symbol: Pyridoxal_deC
- Pfam: PF00282
- Pfam clan: CL0061
- InterPro: IPR002129
- PROSITE: PDOC00329
- SCOP2: 1js3 / SCOPe / SUPFAM
Available protein structures:
- PDB: IPR002129 PF00282 (ECOD; PDBsum)
- AlphaFold: IPR002129; PF00282

In molecular biology, group II pyridoxal-dependent decarboxylases are a family of enzymes including aromatic-L-amino-acid decarboxylase (L-dopa decarboxylase or tryptophan decarboxylase) EC 4.1.1.28 that catalyse the decarboxylation of tryptophan to tryptamine, tyrosine decarboxylase EC 4.1.1.25 that converts tyrosine into tyramine and histidine decarboxylase EC 4.1.1.22 that catalyses the decarboxylation of histidine to histamine.

Pyridoxal-5'-phosphate-dependent amino acid decarboxylases can be divided into four groups based on amino acid sequence: group II includes glutamate, histidine, tyrosine, and aromatic-L-amino-acid decarboxylases.

== See also ==
- Group I pyridoxal-dependent decarboxylases
- Group III pyridoxal-dependent decarboxylases
- Group IV pyridoxal-dependent decarboxylases
