= Methionine decarboxylase =

Class of enzymes

Identifiers
- EC no.: 4.1.1.57
- CAS no.: 37290-50-9

Databases
- BRENDA: enzyme data
- ExPASy: NiceZyme view
- KEGG: enzyme entry
- MetaCyc: metabolic pathway
- Rhea: reactions
- PDB structures: RCSB PDB PDBe PDBsum
- Gene Ontology: AmiGO / QuickGO
Search
- PMC: articles
- PubMed: articles
- NCBI: proteins

Methionine decarboxylase (EC 4.1.1.57) is an enzyme characterised from a Streptomyces species that catalyzes the decarboxylation of L-methionine to 3-(methylthio)propylamine and carbon dioxide:

L-methionine
CO_{2}
3-(methylthio)propylamine

Pyridoxal phosphate is used as a cofactor. The enzyme has been investigated for anti-cancer therapy, and is significant in dimethyl sulfide production in algal blooms.

This enzyme is a lyase, specifically a carboxy-lyase, which cleave carbon-carbon bonds. The systematic name of this enzyme class is L-methionine carboxy-lyase (3-methylthiopropyl amine-forming). Other names in use include L-methionine decarboxylase and L-methionine carboxy-lyase.
