= 4-carboxymuconolactone decarboxylase =

Class of enzymes

Identifiers
- EC no.: 4.1.1.44
- CAS no.: 37289-46-6

Databases
- BRENDA: enzyme data
- ExPASy: NiceZyme view
- KEGG: enzyme entry
- MetaCyc: metabolic pathway
- Rhea: reactions
- PDB structures: RCSB PDB PDBe PDBsum
- Gene Ontology: AmiGO / QuickGO
Search
- PMC: articles
- PubMed: articles
- NCBI: proteins

4-carboxymuconolactone decarboxylase (EC 4.1.1.44) is an enzyme characterised from Pseudomonas putida that catalyzes the decarboxylation of 2-(carboxymethyl)-5-oxo-2,5-dihydro-2-furoic acid to 5-oxo-4,5-dihydro-2-furylacetic acid and carbon dioxide:

2-(carboxymethyl)-5-oxo-2,5-dihydro-2-furoic acid
CO_{2}
5-oxo-4,5-dihydro-2-furylacetic acid

The reaction is part of a pathway for catabolism of catechol to β-ketoadipic acid. The enzyme has been of interest for industrial production of small molecules based on using lignin.

This enzyme is a lyase, specifically a carboxy-lyase, which cleave carbon-carbon bonds. The systematic name of this enzyme class is 2-carboxy-2,5-dihydro-5-oxofuran-2-acetate carboxy-lyase (4,5-dihydro-5-oxofuran-2-acetate-forming). Other names in use include gamma-4-carboxymuconolactone decarboxylase and 4-carboxymuconolactone carboxy-lyase.

== Structural studies ==
As of late 2007, only one structure has been solved for this class of enzymes, with the PDB accession code PDB: 2AF7.
