= UXS1 =

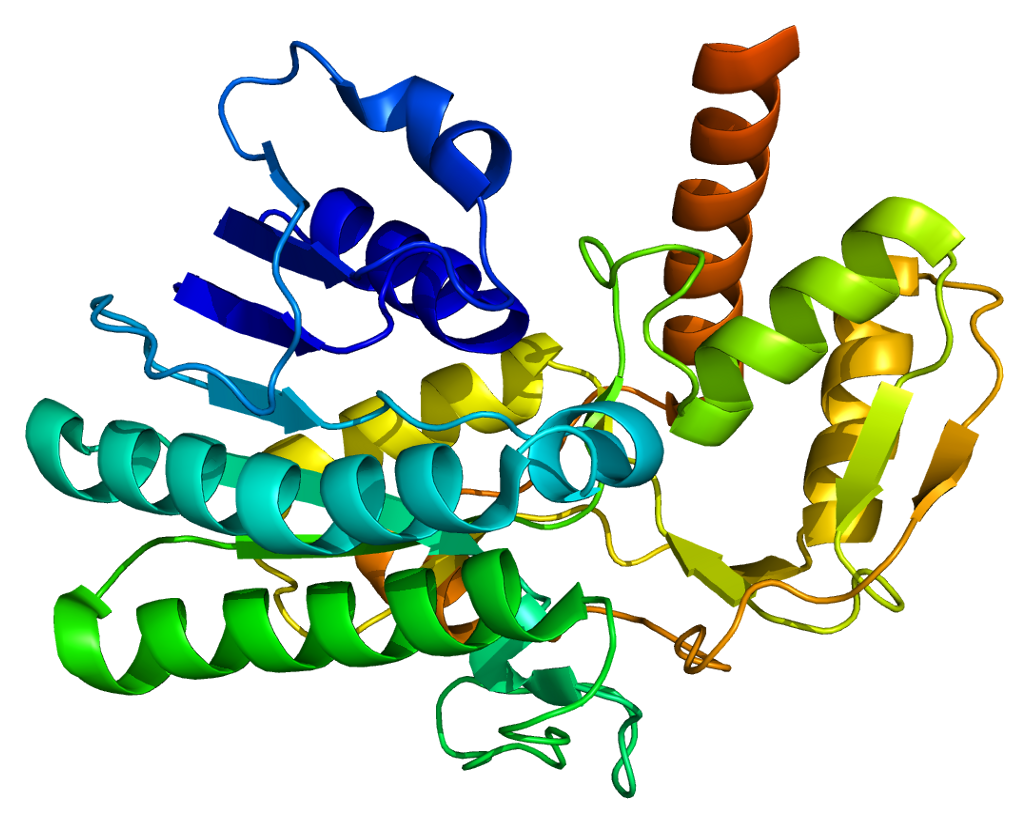

Identifiers
- Aliases: UXS1, SDR6E1, UGD, UDP-glucuronate decarboxylase 1
- External IDs: OMIM: 609749; MGI: 1915133; GeneCards: UXS1
Available structures
PDB	Ortholog search: PDBe RCSB
PDB	List of PDB id codes 2B69, 4GLL, 4LK3, 4M55
Enzyme activity
EC #	BRENDA	ExPASy	KEGG	MetaCyc
4.1.1.35	↗	↗	↗	↗

Gene location (Human)
Chr.	Chromosome 2 (human)
Band	2q12.2	Start	106,093,308 bp
Band	2q12.2	End	106,194,301 bp

Gene location (Mouse)
Chr.	Chromosome 1 (mouse)
Band	1|1 C1.1	Start	43,746,966 bp
Band	1|1 C1.1	End	43,827,800 bp
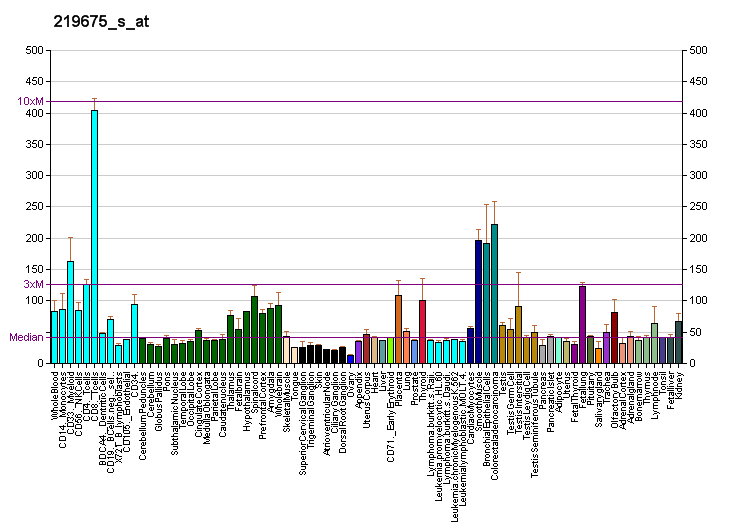
RNA expression pattern
Bgee	Human / Mouse (ortholog); Top expressed in: secondary oocyte; renal medulla; cartilage tissue; tibia; visceral pleura; decidua; germinal epithelium; spinal ganglia; trigeminal ganglion; stromal cell of endometrium / Top expressed in: decidua; motor neuron; Epithelium of choroid plexus; primary oocyte; fossa; condyle; endothelial cell of lymphatic vessel; cumulus cell; secondary oocyte; conjunctival fornix; More reference expression data
BioGPS	More reference expression data
Gene ontology
Molecular function	protein homodimerization activity; carboxy-lyase activity; NAD+ binding; lyase activity; UDP-glucuronate decarboxylase activity
Cellular component	integral component of membrane; Golgi cisterna membrane; Golgi apparatus; extracellular exosome; mitochondrion; membrane; cytoplasm
Biological process	protein tetramerization; UDP-D-xylose biosynthetic process
Sources:Amigo / QuickGO
Orthologs
Databases	NCBI: entry; OMA: entry
Species	Human	Mouse
Entrez	80146	67883
Ensembl	ENSG00000115652	ENSMUSG00000057363
UniProt	Q8NBZ7	Q91XL3
RefSeq (mRNA)	NM_001253875; NM_001253876; NM_025076; NM_001377504; NM_001377505 NM_001377506; NM_001377507; NM_001377508; NM_001377509	NM_026430
RefSeq (protein)	NP_001240804; NP_001240805; NP_079352; NP_001364433; NP_001364434 NP_001364435; NP_001364436; NP_001364437; NP_001364438	NP_080706; NP_001355216; NP_001355217; NP_001355218
Location (UCSC)	Chr 2: 106.09 – 106.19 Mb	Chr 1: 43.75 – 43.83 Mb
PubMed search
- Wikidata
View/Edit Human	View/Edit Mouse

UDP-glucuronic acid decarboxylase 1 is an enzyme that in humans is encoded by the UXS1 gene.

UDP-glucuronate decarboxylase (UGD; EC 4.1.1.35) catalyzes the formation of UDP-xylose from UDP-glucuronate. UDP-xylose is then used to initiate glycosaminoglycan biosynthesis on the core protein of proteoglycans.[supplied by OMIM]

== See also ==
- Carboxy-lyases
- Golgi apparatus
- Tetrameric protein
- Uridine diphosphate (UDP)
