= 5-guanidino-2-oxopentanoate decarboxylase =

Class of enzymes

Identifiers
- EC no.: 4.1.1.75
- CAS no.: 56831-67-5

Databases
- BRENDA: enzyme data
- ExPASy: NiceZyme view
- KEGG: enzyme entry
- MetaCyc: metabolic pathway
- Rhea: reactions
- PDB structures: RCSB PDB PDBe PDBsum
- Gene Ontology: AmiGO / QuickGO
Search
- PMC: articles
- PubMed: articles
- NCBI: proteins

The enzyme 5-guanidino-2-oxopentanoate decarboxylase (EC 4.1.1.75), characterised from Pseudomonas putida, catalyzes the decarboxylation of 5-guanidino-2-oxopentanoic acid to 4-guanidinobutanal and carbon dioxide:

5-guanidino-2-oxopentanoic acid
CO_{2}
4-guanidinobutanal

Thiamine pyrophosphate is used as a cofactor. The reaction is part of the breakdown pathway for the amino acid, arginine.

This enzyme is a lyase, specifically a carboxy-lyase, which cleave carbon-carbon bonds. The systematic name of this enzyme class is 5-guanidino-2-oxo-pentanoate carboxy-lyase (4-guanidinobutanal-forming). Other names in use include alpha-ketoarginine decarboxylase, and 2-oxo-5-guanidinopentanoate carboxy-lyase.
