= FMH =

FMH may refer to:

- Fatima Memorial Hospital, in Lahore, Pakistan
- Federal Ministry of Health (Nigeria)
- Feminist Mormon Housewives, a blog
- Fetal-maternal haemorrhage
- Finchley Memorial Hospital, in North Finchley, London
- Finemore Holdings, ASX ticker for former Australian logistics company
- Fischmarkt Hamburg-Altona, a German logistics company
- Foederatio Medicorum Helveticorum, literally "Swiss Medical Association"
- Frederick Memorial Hospital, in Frederick County, Maryland, United States
- α-Fluoromethylhistidine, a synthetic inhibitor of histidine decarboxylase
- Modern and Humanist France (French: France moderne et humaniste), a French political faction
- Otis Air National Guard Base/Coast Guard Air Station Cape Cod, part of Joint Base Cape Cod in Massachusetts, United States
