= Ulad =

Ulad may refer to:

- 3-dehydro-L-gulonate-6-phosphate decarboxylase, an enzyme
- Ulaid, a people of early Ireland
