= Carnitine decarboxylase =

Class of enzymes

Identifiers
- EC no.: 4.1.1.42
- CAS no.: 37237-38-0

Databases
- BRENDA: enzyme data
- ExPASy: NiceZyme view
- KEGG: enzyme entry
- MetaCyc: metabolic pathway
- Rhea: reactions
- PDB structures: RCSB PDB PDBe PDBsum
- Gene Ontology: AmiGO / QuickGO
Search
- PMC: articles
- PubMed: articles
- NCBI: proteins

Carnitine decarboxylase (EC 4.1.1.42) is a mammalian enzyme that catalyzes the decarboxylation of carnitine to 2-methylcholine and carbon dioxide:

carnitine
CO_{2}
2-methylcholine

The enzyme uses adenosine triphosphate as a cofactor to drive the reaction to completion.

This enzyme is a lyase, specifically a carboxy-lyase, which cleave carbon-carbon bonds. The systematic name of this enzyme class is carnitine carboxy-lyase (2-methylcholine-forming). This enzyme is also called carnitine carboxy-lyase.
