= C7H11N3O2 =

The molecular formula C_{7}H_{11}N_{3}O_{2} (molar mass: 169.18 g/mol, exact mass: 169.0851 u) may refer to:

- Histidine methyl ester (HME)
- Ipronidazole
- 3-Methylhistidine (3-MH)
