= Phenylalanine decarboxylase =

Class of enzymes

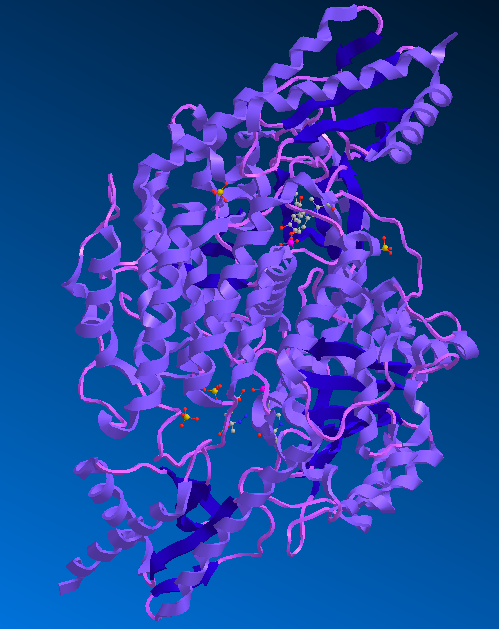

Identifiers
- EC no.: 4.1.1.53
- CAS no.: 9075-72-3

Databases
- BRENDA: enzyme data
- ExPASy: NiceZyme view
- KEGG: enzyme entry
- MetaCyc: metabolic pathway
- Rhea: reactions
- PDB structures: RCSB PDB PDBe PDBsum
- Gene Ontology: AmiGO / QuickGO
Search
- PMC: articles
- PubMed: articles
- NCBI: proteins

The enzyme phenylalanine decarboxylase (EC 4.1.1.53) catalyzes the decarboxylation of L-phenylalanine to phenethylamine:

phenylalanine
CO_{2}
phenethylamine

Pyridoxal phosphate is used as a cofactor.

This enzyme is a lyase, specifically a carboxy-lyase, which cleave carbon-carbon bonds. The systematic name of this enzyme class is L-phenylalanine carboxy-lyase (phenylethylamine-forming). Other names in use include L-phenylalanine decarboxylase, aromatic L-amino acid decarboxylase, and L-phenylalanine carboxy-lyase.
