= Histidine decarboxylase =

Class of enzymes

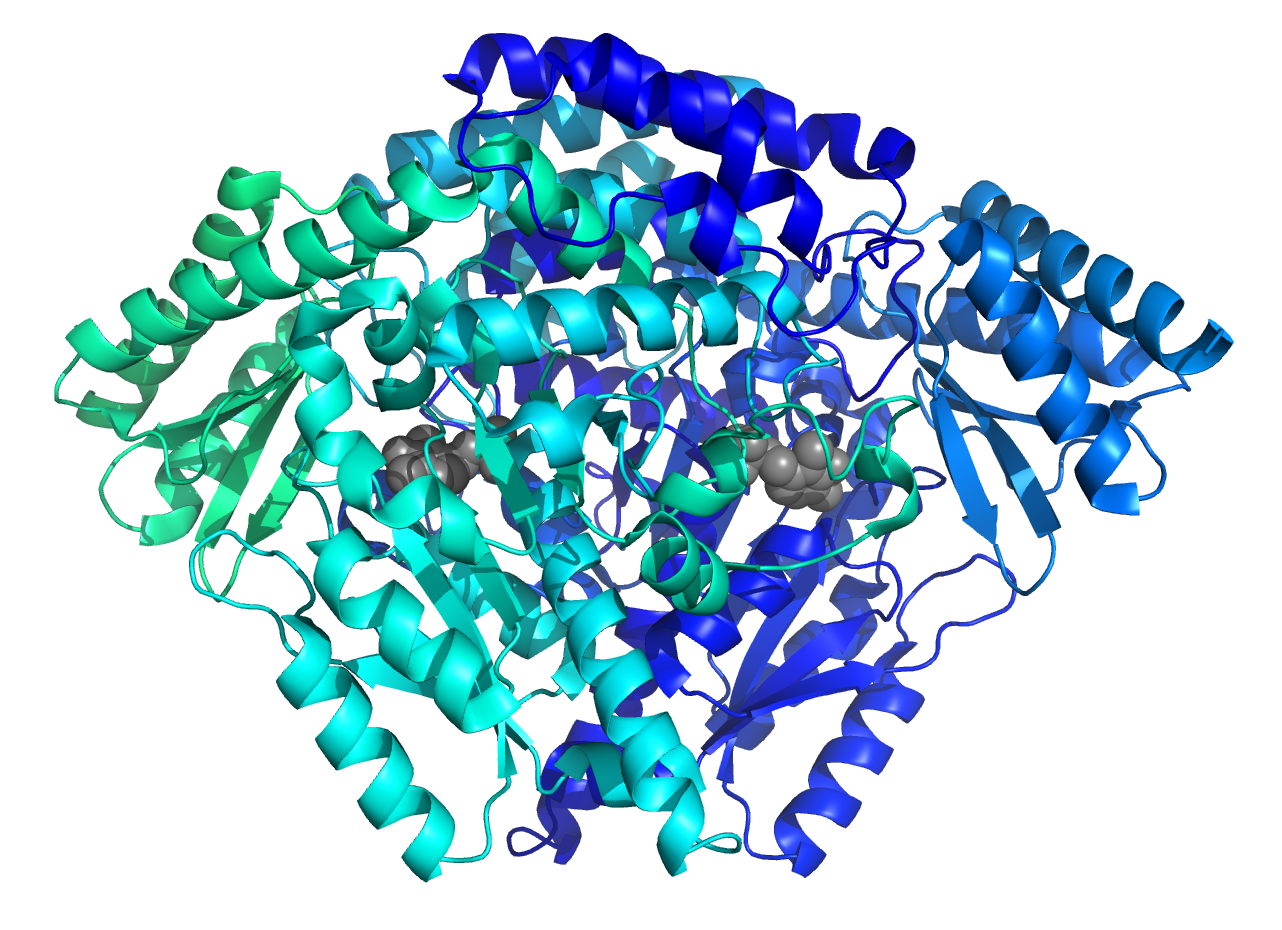
- Cartoon depiction of C-truncated HDC dimer with PLP residing in active site.

Identifiers
- EC no.: 4.1.1.22
- CAS no.: 9024-61-7

Databases
- BRENDA: enzyme data
- ExPASy: NiceZyme view
- KEGG: enzyme entry
- MetaCyc: metabolic pathway
- Rhea: reactions
- PDB structures: RCSB PDB PDBe PDBsum
- Gene Ontology: AmiGO / QuickGO
Search
- PMC: articles
- PubMed: articles
- NCBI: proteins

HDC

Identifiers
- Aliases: HDC, entrez:3067, Histidine decarboxylase
- External IDs: OMIM: 142704; MGI: 96062; GeneCards: HDC
Available structures
PDB	Ortholog search: PDBe RCSB
PDB	List of PDB id codes 4E1O
Enzyme activity
EC #	BRENDA	ExPASy	KEGG	MetaCyc
4.1.1.22	↗	↗	↗	↗

Gene location (Human)
Chr.	Chromosome 15 (human)
Band	15q21.2	Start	50,241,947 bp
Band	15q21.2	End	50,265,965 bp

Gene location (Mouse)
Chr.	Chromosome 2 (mouse)
Band	2 F1|2 61.76 cM	Start	126,435,587 bp
Band	2 F1|2 61.76 cM	End	126,461,219 bp
RNA expression pattern
Bgee	Human / Mouse (ortholog); Top expressed in: gallbladder; oocyte; secondary oocyte; cardia; body of stomach; fundus; corpus epididymis; monocyte; rectum; upper lobe of left lung / Top expressed in: granulocyte; dermis; respiratory epithelium; nasal epithelium; olfactory epithelium; Epithelium of choroid plexus; right lung lobe; left lung; left lung lobe; umbilical cord; More reference expression data
BioGPS	n/a
Gene ontology
Molecular function	pyridoxal phosphate binding; protein binding; histidine decarboxylase activity; catalytic activity; carboxy-lyase activity; lyase activity
Cellular component	cytosol
Biological process	cellular amino acid metabolic process; catecholamine biosynthetic process; histidine metabolic process; carboxylic acid metabolic process; histidine catabolic process; histamine biosynthetic process
Sources:Amigo / QuickGO
Orthologs
Databases	NCBI: entry; OMA: entry
Species	Human	Mouse
Entrez	3067	15186
Ensembl	ENSG00000140287	ENSMUSG00000027360
UniProt	P19113	P23738
RefSeq (mRNA)	NM_001306146; NM_002112	NM_008230
RefSeq (protein)	NP_001293075; NP_002103	NP_032256
Location (UCSC)	Chr 15: 50.24 – 50.27 Mb	Chr 2: 126.44 – 126.46 Mb
PubMed search
- Wikidata
View/Edit Human	View/Edit Mouse

The enzyme histidine decarboxylase (EC 4.1.1.22, HDC) is transcribed on chromosome 15, region q21.1-21.2, and catalyzes the decarboxylation of histidine to form histamine and carbon dioxide:

histidine
CO_{2}
histamine

In mammals, histamine is an important biogenic amine with regulatory roles in neurotransmission, gastric acid secretion and immune response. Histidine decarboxylase is the sole member of the histamine synthesis pathway, producing histamine in a one-step reaction. Histamine cannot be generated by any other known enzyme. HDC is therefore the primary source of histamine in most mammals and eukaryotes. The enzyme employs a pyridoxal 5'-phosphate (PLP) cofactor, in similarity to many amino acid decarboxylases. Eukaryotes, as well as gram-negative bacteria share a common HDC, while gram-positive bacteria employ an evolutionarily unrelated pyruvoyl-dependent HDC. In humans, histidine decarboxylase is encoded by the HDC gene.

== Structure ==
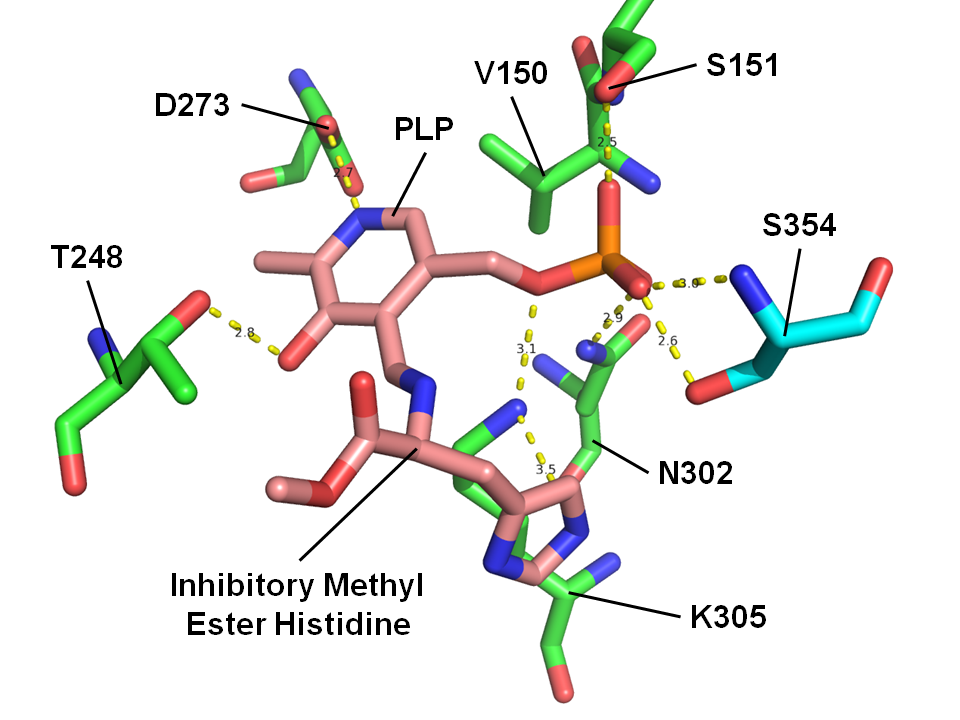
PLP is normally covalently bound to HDC at lysine 305. It is also held in place with hydrogen bonds to other nearby amino acids. Here, the active site is shown with PLP bound to histidine methyl ester, which was necessary for crystallization. Generated from 4E1O.

Histidine decarboxylase is a group II pyridoxal-dependent decarboxylase, along with aromatic-L-amino-acid decarboxylase, and tyrosine decarboxylase. HDC is expressed as a 74 kDa polypeptide which is not enzymatically functional. Only after post-translational processing does the enzyme become active. This processing consists of truncating much of the protein's C-terminal chain, reducing the peptide molecular weight to 54 kDa.

Histidine decarboxylase exists as a homodimer, with several amino acids from the respective opposing chain stabilizing the HDC active site. In HDC's resting state, PLP is covalently bound in a Schiff base to lysine 305, and stabilized by several hydrogen bonds to nearby amino acids aspartate 273, serine 151 and the opposing chain's serine 354. HDC contains several regions that are sequentially and structurally similar to those in a number of other pyridoxal-dependent decarboxylases. This is particularly evident in the vicinity of the active site lysine 305.

== Mechanism ==
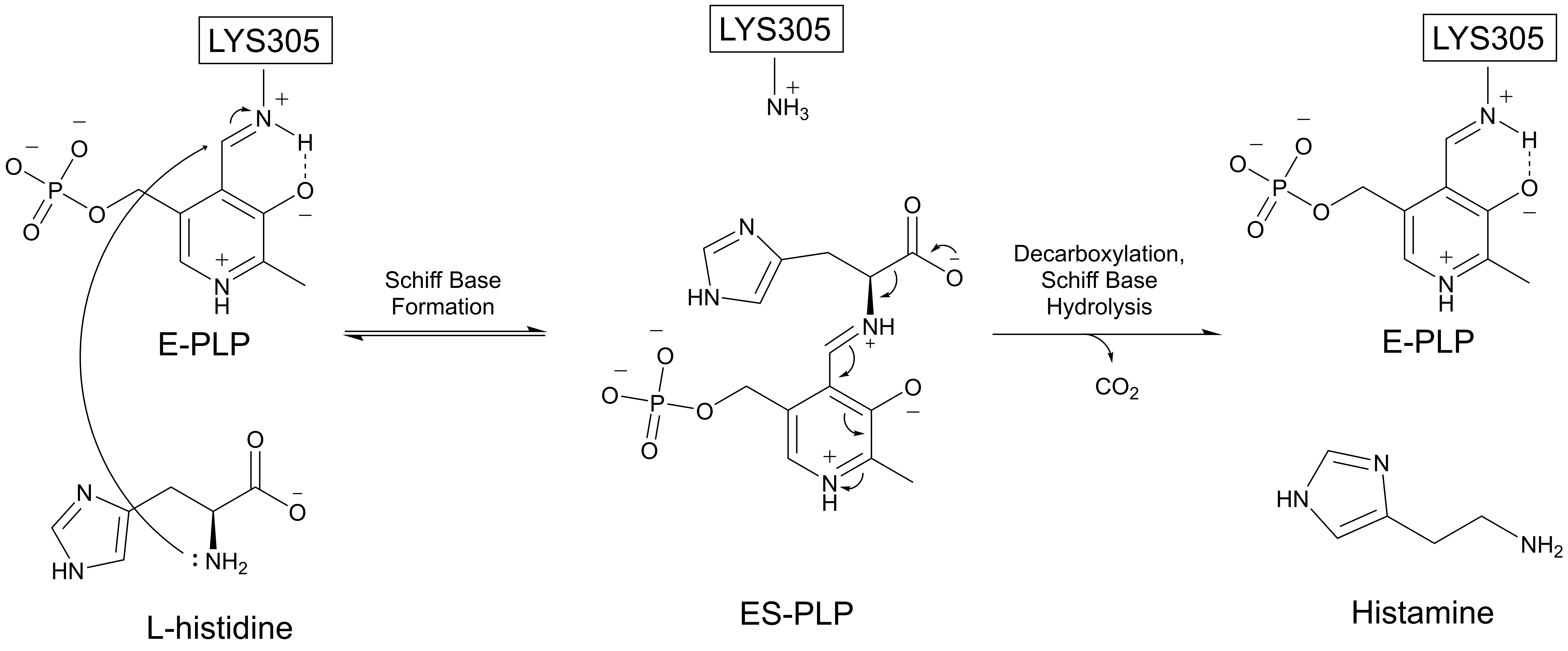
Mechanism of histidine decarboxylation by HDC using the PLP co-factor. This mechanism is similar to many other PLP-dependent carboxylases.

HDC decarboxylates histidine through the use of a PLP cofactor initially bound in a Schiff base to lysine 305. Histidine initiates the reaction by displacing lysine 305 and forming an aldimine with PLP. Then, histidine's carboxyl group leaves the substrate, forming carbon dioxide. This is the rate-limiting step of the all process, requiring an activation energy of 17.6 kcal/mol and fitting the experimental turnover of 1.73 $\ce{s^{-1}}$. After the decarboxylation takes place, the PLP intermediate is protonated by tyrosine 334 from the second subunit. The protonation is mediated by a water molecule and it is very fast and also very exergonic. Finally, PLP re-forms its original Schiff base at lysine 305, and histamine is released. This mechanism is very similar to those employed by other pyridoxal-dependent decarboxylases. In particular, the aldimine intermediate is a common feature of all known PLP-dependent decarboxylases. HDC is highly specific for its histidine substrate.

== Biological relevance ==
Histidine decarboxylase is the primary biological source of histamine. Histamine is an important biogenic amine that moderates numerous physiologic processes. There are four different histamine receptors, H_{1}, H_{2}, H_{3}, and H_{4}, each of which carries a different biological significance. H_{1} modulates several functions of the central and peripheral nervous system, including circadian rhythm, body temperature and appetite. H_{2} activation results in gastric acid secretion and smooth muscle relaxation. H_{3} controls histamine turnover by feedback inhibition of histamine synthesis and release. Finally, H_{4} plays roles in mast cell chemotaxis and cytokine production.

In humans, HDC is primarily expressed in mast cells and basophil granulocytes. Accordingly, these cells contain the body's highest concentrations of histamine granules. Non-mast cell histamine is also found in the brain, where it is used as a neurotransmitter.

== Inhibition ==
HDC can be inhibited by α-fluoromethylhistidine and histidine methyl ester.

== Clinical significance ==
Antihistamines are a class of medications designed to reduce unwanted effects of histamine in the body. Typical antihistamines block specific histamine receptors, depending on what physiological purpose they serve. For example, diphenhydramine (Benadryl™), targets and inhibits the H1 histamine receptor to relieve symptoms of allergic reactions. Inhibitors of histidine decarboxylase can conceivably be used as atypical antihistamines. Tritoqualine, as well as various catechins, such as epigallocatechin-3-gallate, a major component of green tea, have been shown to target HDC and histamine-producing cells, reducing histamine levels and providing anti-inflammatory, anti-tumoral, and anti-angiogenic effects.

Mutations in the gene for histidine decarboxylase have been observed in one family with Tourette syndrome and are not thought to account for most cases of it.

== See also ==
- Aromatic L-amino acid decarboxylase
- Tyrosine decarboxylase
- Antihistamine
- Mast cell
