= Stanton Cohn =

Medical researcher (b. 1920, d. 2008)

Stanton H. Cohn (August 25, 1920 – April 28, 2008) was an expert in osteoporosis and the head of the Medical Physics Division at Brookhaven National Lab.

== Early life ==
Cohn was born in Chicago, Illinois in 1920 to Harry and Ethel Cohn, parents of Eastern European Jewish heritage. He married Sylva May on March 20, 1949, and had five children. He served in the United States Army from June 1943 until April 1946 working as a biochemist in the 203rd General Hospital Division in France and England.

After the war, he attended University of Chicago, graduating with a B.A. and M.S. in 1946. He later attended University of California Berkeley where he received his Ph.D. in 1952 in physiology and radiobiology. His thesis was titled The Effects of Ionizing Radiation on the Growth and Metabolism of Bone.

== Career ==
From 1950 to 1958, Cohn led the Internal Toxicity Branch of the Biomedical Division of the United States Naval Research Laboratory. He also conducted research on mineral metabolism in bone, biological distribution and effects of internally deposited radionuclides, and whole-body neutron activation analysis.

Cohn worked at Brookhaven National Lab beginning in 1958. He rose to become the head of the Medical Physics Division in 1970, a position that he held until his retirement in 1987. He also held a joint appointment as Professor of Medicine (Clinical Physiology) in the School of Medicine of State University of New York at Stony Brook. During his career, Dr. Cohn authored or co-authored over 300 papers.

Cohn was a pioneer in the study of non-invasive measurement of calcium and other elements in the human body. He was one of the early developers of in vivo neutron activation analysis for body composition in 1971. Working with H.C. Lukaski, J. Mendez, and E.R. Buskirk in 1981, Cohn developed the urinary 3-Methylhistidine method to estimate total body skeletal muscle mass. Along with J.J. Kehayias, K.J. Ellis and J.H. Weinlein he "established the first inelastic scattering facility for estimating total body carbon and oxygen in 1987."

At Brookhaven National Lab, he led a group using whole-body counting to identify and measure radioactive material in the body. He later was part of a team that was among the first to recognize that nuclear fallout from test sites might have local health implications. Cohn was a member of the team that returned to the Marshall Islands after the United States government performed nuclear testing, to aid the Marshallese people and to continue monitoring, in 1959, 1961, 1974 and 1977.

In subsequent years, he expanded his work to study the effects of cadmium, mercury and other harmful elements on workers in the smelting and mining industries.

He died in 2008 in Portland, Oregon.

== Selected publications ==
- Cohn S.H. (1952). "Effects of total body x-irradiation on blood coagulation in the rat". Blood. 7 (2): 225–34. doi:10.1182/blood.V7.2.225.225. PMID 14886416.
- “The Effects of Ionizing Radiation on the Growth and Metabolism of Bone,” S.H. Cohn, Ph.D. Thesis: University of California, 1952
- “Role of Cybernetics in Physiology,” S.H. Cohn and S.M. Cohn, from The Scientific Monthly, Vol. 76, No. 2, Feb, 1953
- “Nature and Extent of Internal Radioactive Contamination of Human Beings, Plants and Animals Exposed to Fallout,” S.H. Cohn, R.W. Rinehart, J.K. Gong, J.S. Robertson, W.L. Milne, US Naval Radiological Defense Laboratory, TR-86, Mar, 1954 https://apps.dtic.mil/docs/citations/AD0617134
- “Radiotoxicity Resulting from Exposure to Fallout Simulant: The Metabolism of an Inhaled and Ingested Simulant of Fallout Produced by Land-base Nuclear Detonation,” S.H. Cohn, W.R. Lane, J.K. Gone, and W.L. Milne, US Naval Radiological Defense Labe TR-118, Jan, 1957 https://www.osti.gov/opennet/servlets/purl/16030232-MbeTHc/16030232.pdf
- Wallach, S.; Aloia, J.; Cohn, S. (1972). "Treatment of osteoporosis with calcitonin". Seminars in Drug Treatment. 2 (1): 21–5. PMID 5065516.
- Cohn, S.H; Shukla, K.K; Ellis, K.J (1974). "A multivariate predictor for total body calcium in man based on activation analysis". International Journal of Nuclear Medicine and Biology. 1 (3): 131–134. doi:10.1016/0047-0740(74)90017-5. PMID 4817576.
- “Correlation of Radial Bone Mineral Content with Total-Body Calcium in Various Metabolic Disorders,” S.H. Cohn, K.J. Ellis, I. Zanzi, J.M. Letteri and J. Aloia, From International Conference on Bone Mineral Measurement, Chicago, 1973. DHEW Publication No. (NIH) 75-683 (Also BNL-18304) http://www.osti.gov/bridge/purl.cover.jsp?purl=/4405764-OE7KED/
- “Applications of Neutron Activation Analysis in Nuclear Medicine,” S.H. Cohn and R. Fairchild, From CRC Handbook in Nuclear Medicine, Ed. R.P. Spencer 1, 285–326, 1977
- “Medical Applications of In-Vivo Neutron Activation Analysis at Brookhaven National Laboratory,” S.H. Cohn, K.J. ellis, D. Varsky, I. Zanzi and J.F. Aloia, From IAEA, Symposium on Nuclear Activation Techniques in the Life Sciences, Vienna, May 1978. IAEA SM – 227/63, pp 747-761, 1978 http://www.osti.gov/bridge/purl.cover.jsp?purl=/6934724-BCCxrP/
- “In Vivo Neutron Activation Analysis,” S.H. Cohn, From Textbook of Nuclear Medicine: Basic Sciences, A.F.G. Rocha and J.C. Harbert (Eds.) Lea & Febiger, Phil., 1978, pp 394-406 ( ISBN 9780812106305 )
- Cohn, Stanton H. (1981). "In vivo neutron activation analysis: State of the art and future prospects". Medical Physics. 8 (2): 145–154. Bibcode:1981MedPh...8..145C. doi:10.1118/1.594899. PMID 7033755.
- Ettinger, K. V.; Morgan, W. D.; Miola, U. J.; Vartsky, D.; Ellis, K. J.; Wielopolski, L.; Cohn, S. H. (1982). "Silicon measurement in a lung phantom by neutron inelastic scattering". Medical Physics. 9 (4): 550–558. Bibcode:1982MedPh...9..550E. doi:10.1118/1.595100. PMID 7110086.
- “Use of a High Repetition Rate Neutron Generator for in-vivo Body Composition Measurement via Neutron Inelastic Scattering” J.J. Kehayias, K.J. Ellis and S.H. Cohn, Nucl. Instr. & Methods in Phys. Res. B24/25, 1006–1009, N. Holland, Amsterdam 1987 https://inis.iaea.org/search/search.aspx?orig_q=RN:1807203
- “Osteoporosis: How to Prevent the Brittle-bone Disease” W. Smith, S.H. Cohn 1985 ISBN 978-0671552527
