= Group I pyridoxal-dependent decarboxylases =

Glycine cleavage system P-protein
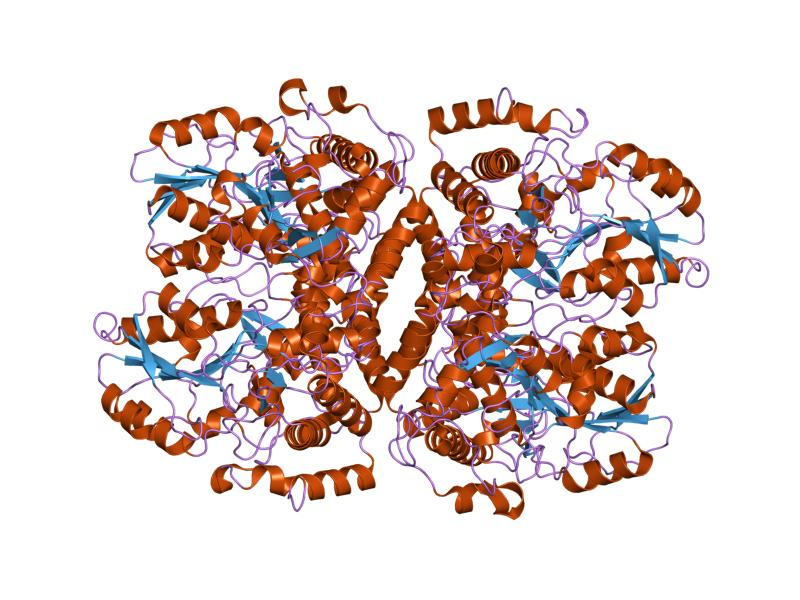
- crystal structure of glycine decarboxylase (p-protein) of the glycine cleavage system, in apo form

Identifiers
- Symbol: GDC-P
- Pfam: PF02347
- Pfam clan: CL0061
- InterPro: IPR020580
Available protein structures:
- PDB: IPR020580 PF02347 (ECOD; PDBsum)
- AlphaFold: IPR020580; PF02347

In molecular biology, the group I pyridoxal-dependent decarboxylases, also known as glycine cleavage system P-proteins, are a family of enzymes consisting of glycine cleavage system P-proteins (glycine dehydrogenase (decarboxylating)) EC 1.4.4.2 from bacterial, mammalian and plant sources. The P protein is part of the glycine decarboxylase multienzyme complex (GDC) also annotated as glycine cleavage system or glycine synthase. The P protein binds the alpha-amino group of glycine through its pyridoxal phosphate cofactor, carbon dioxide is released and the remaining methylamine moiety is then transferred to the lipoamide cofactor of the H protein. GDC consists of four proteins P, H, L and T.

Pyridoxal-5'-phosphate-dependent amino acid decarboxylases can be divided into four groups based on amino acid sequence. Group I comprises glycine decarboxylases.

== See also ==
- Group II pyridoxal-dependent decarboxylases
- Group III pyridoxal-dependent decarboxylases
- Group IV pyridoxal-dependent decarboxylases
