= Tritoqualine =

Chemical compound

Clinical data
- AHFS/Drugs.com: International Drug Names
- ATC code: R06AX21 (WHO)

Identifiers
- IUPAC name: 7-amino-4,5,6-triethoxy-3-(4-methoxy-6-methyl-7,8-dihydro-5H-[1,3]dioxolo[4,5-g]isoquinolin-5-yl)-3H-isobenzofuran-1-one
- CAS Number: 14504-73-5
- PubChem CID: 72145
- ChemSpider: 65119
- UNII: F4MW5166YH
- CompTox Dashboard (EPA): DTXSID10864514

Chemical and physical data
- Formula: C_{26}H_{32}N_{2}O_{8}
- Molar mass: 500.548 g·mol^{−1}
- 3D model (JSmol): Interactive image
- SMILES: CCOC1=C(C(=C(C2=C1C(OC2=O)C3C4=C(C5=C(C=C4CCN3C)OCO5)OC)N)OCC)OCC

Tritoqualine, also known as hypostamine, is an inhibitor of the enzyme histidine decarboxylase and therefore an atypical antihistamine, used for the treatment of urticaria and allergic rhinitis with no known adverse effects.
