= 3-dehydro-L-gulonate-6-phosphate decarboxylase =

Class of enzymes

Identifiers
- EC no.: 4.1.1.85

Databases
- BRENDA: enzyme data
- ExPASy: NiceZyme view
- KEGG: enzyme entry
- MetaCyc: metabolic pathway
- Rhea: reactions
- PDB structures: RCSB PDB PDBe PDBsum
Search
- PMC: articles
- PubMed: articles
- NCBI: proteins

The enzyme 3-dehydro-L-gulonate-6-phosphate decarboxylase (EC 4.1.1.85), characterised from Escherichia coli, catalyzes the decarboxylation of 3-dehydro-L-gulonic acid 6-phosphate to L-xylulose-5-phosphoric acid and carbon dioxide:

3-dehydro-L-gulonic acid 6-phosphate
CO_{2}
L-xylulose-5-phosphoric acid

The structure of the enzyme from Streptococcus mutans has been determined by X-ray crystallography. It requires magnesium as Mg^{2+} and is part of a pathway that allows use of ascorbic acid.

This enzyme is a of lyase, specifically a carboxy-lyase, which cleave carbon-carbon bonds. The systematic name of this enzyme class is 3-dehydro-L-gulonate-6-phosphate carboxy-lyase (L-xylulose-5-phosphate-forming). Other names in use include 3-keto-L-gulonate 6-phosphate decarboxylase, UlaD, SgaH, SgbH, KGPDC, and 3-dehydro-L-gulonate-6-phosphate carboxy-lyase.
