= Α-Fluoromethylhistidine =

α-Fluoromethylhistidine

Names
- Other names α-FMH

Identifiers
CAS Number	73804-75-8
3D model (JSmol)	Interactive image
ChemSpider	96833
PubChem CID	188141
UNII	7DZ4K6ZN32
- InChI: InChI=1S/C7H10FN3O2/c8-3-7(9,6(12)13)1-5-2-10-4-11-5/h2,4H,1,3,9H2,(H,10,11)(H,12,13)/t7-/m1/s1 Key: AJFGLTPLWPTALJ-SSDOTTSWSA-N
- SMILES: c1c([nH]cn1)CC(CF)(C(=O)O)N

Properties
Chemical formula	C_{7}H_{10}FN_{3}O_{2}
Molar mass	187.174 g·mol^{−1}
- Except where otherwise noted, data are given for materials in their standard state (at 25 °C [77 °F], 100 kPa). Infobox references

α-Fluoromethylhistidine (α-FMH) is an irreversible specific inhibitor of histidine decarboxylase (HDC). It functions by forming a covalent linkage with a catalytic serine residue on the active site of HDC. Due to its efficacy in reducing histamine levels in tissue mast cells, it has many applications in the study of histaminergic systems.

It has potent sleep-inducing effects in mice. In the central nervous systems of rats, α-FMH administration has been shown to cause impairments in long-term memory and learning. Additionally, injection of α-FMH has been shown to increase food intake, although the mechanism is believed to distinct from HDC inhibition, indicating that α-FMH may be involved in the regulation of non-histaminergic systems. A proposed mechanism involves the enhanced expression of neuropeptide Y (NPY) rather than HDC inhibition.

α-FMH has also been shown to target isozymes of the glutathione S-transferase (GST) family. Due to the role of GSTs in detoxification, the efficacy of HDC inhibition by α-FMH in humans and its potential for the treatment of pathological conditions is subject to further research.

== See also ==
- Histidine decarboxylase
- Histidine methyl ester
