= Histidine methyl ester =

Names
- Other names Methyl L-histidinate, HME

Identifiers
CAS Number	1499-46-3; 7389-87-9 (HCl)
3D model (JSmol)	Interactive image
Beilstein Reference	957974
ChEBI	CHEBI:70961
ChEMBL	ChEMBL54664
ChemSpider	83857
ECHA InfoCard	100.014.645
EC Number	216-109-3
PubChem CID	92893
UNII	9IHZ1723UE
CompTox Dashboard (EPA)	DTXSID90933797
- InChI: InChI=1S/C7H11N3O2/c1-12-7(11)6(8)2-5-3-9-4-10-5/h3-4,6H,2,8H2,1H3,(H,9,10)/t6-/m0/s1 Key: BXRMEWOQUXOLDH-LURJTMIESA-N
- SMILES: COC(=O)[C@H](Cc1c[nH]cn1)N

Properties
Chemical formula	C_{7}H_{11}N_{3}O_{2}
Molar mass	169.184 g·mol^{−1}
- Except where otherwise noted, data are given for materials in their standard state (at 25 °C [77 °F], 100 kPa). Infobox references

Histidine methyl ester (HME) is an irreversible histidine decarboxylase inhibitor. It is the methyl ester of histidine.

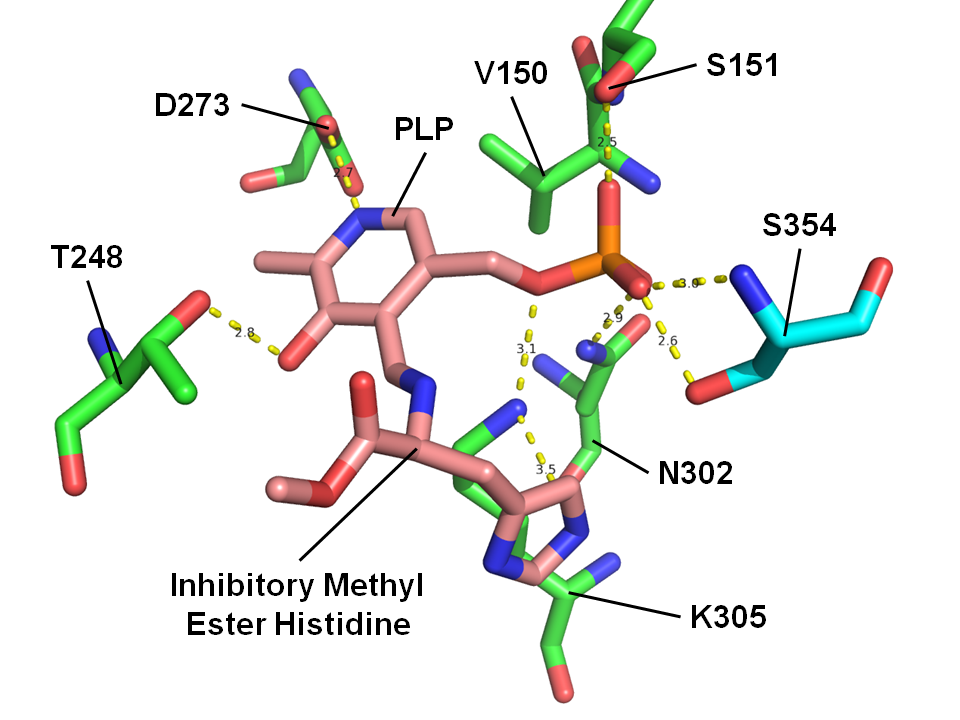
HME bound to histidine decarboxylase

== See also ==
- Histidine decarboxylase
- α-Fluoromethylhistidine
