= Lysine decarboxylase =

Class of enzymes

Identifiers
- EC no.: 4.1.1.18
- CAS no.: 9024-76-4

Databases
- BRENDA: enzyme data
- ExPASy: NiceZyme view
- KEGG: enzyme entry
- MetaCyc: metabolic pathway
- Rhea: reactions
- PDB structures: RCSB PDB PDBe PDBsum
- Gene Ontology: AmiGO / QuickGO
Search
- PMC: articles
- PubMed: articles
- NCBI: proteins

Lysine decarboxylase (EC 4.1.1.18) is an enzyme characterised from Bacterium cadaveris and Escherichia coli that catalyses the decarboxylation of lysine to cadaverine and carbon dioxide:

L-lysine
CO_{2}
cadaverine

The reaction is involved in acid-stress response in Enterobacteria since the conversion lowers the overall acidity of its environment. Pyridoxal phosphate is used as a cofactor.

Metabolic engineering of the enzyme from E. coli has been used allow the industrial production of cadaverine.
