= Tyrosine decarboxylase =

Class of enzymes

Identifiers
- EC no.: 4.1.1.25
- CAS no.: 9002-09-9

Databases
- BRENDA: enzyme data
- ExPASy: NiceZyme view
- KEGG: enzyme entry
- MetaCyc: metabolic pathway
- Rhea: reactions
- PDB structures: RCSB PDB PDBe PDBsum
- Gene Ontology: AmiGO / QuickGO
Search
- PMC: articles
- PubMed: articles
- NCBI: proteins

Tyrosine decarboxylase (EC 4.1.1.25) is an enzyme characterised from Streptococcus faecalis that catalyzes the decarboxylation of L-tyrosine to tyramine and carbon dioxide:

tyrosine
CO_{2}
tyramine

Pyridoxal phosphate is used as a cofactor and this reaction is the final step in the biosynthesis of tyramine. The structure of the enzyme has been determined by X-ray crystallography. The enzyme is widely present in plants, bacteria and animals, including Arabidopsis thaliana, Papaver somniferum, Lactobacillus brevis, Phormia regina, and Drosophila melanogaster.

Excessive bacterial production of the enzyme in the human gut has been linked to unresponsiveness to levodopa by patients with Parkinson's disease.

This enzyme is a lyase, specifically a carboxy-lyases, which cleave carbon-carbon bonds. The systematic name of this enzyme class is L-tyrosine carboxy-lyase (tyramine-forming). Other names in common use include L-tyrosine decarboxylase, L-(−)-tyrosine apodecarboxylase, and L-tyrosine carboxy-lyase.
