= 3-Methylhistidine =

Names
- Systematic IUPAC name (2S)-2-Amino-3-(1-methyl-1H-imidazol-5-yl)propanoic acid

Identifiers
| CAS Number | 368-16-1 |
| 3D model (JSmol) | Interactive image |
| Beilstein Reference | 83651 |
| ChEBI | CHEBI:27596 |
| ChEMBL | ChEMBL3251670 |
| ChemSpider | 58494 |
| ECHA InfoCard | 100.006.095 |
| EC Number | 206-704-6 |
| Gmelin Reference | 1568650 |
| KEGG | C01152 |
| PubChem CID | 64969 |
| UNII | MEH8O8Y0H0 |
| CompTox Dashboard (EPA) | DTXSID90920521 |
- InChI: InChI=1S/C7H11N3O2/c1-10-4-9-3-5(10)2-6(8)7(11)12/h3-4,6H,2,8H2,1H3,(H,11,12)/t6-/m0/s1 Key: JDHILDINMRGULE-LURJTMIESA-N
- SMILES: CN1C=NC=C1CC(C(=O)O)N

Properties
| Chemical formula | C_{7}H_{11}N_{3}O_{2} |
| Molar mass | 169.184 |
| Solubility in water | 200 mg/mL at 25 °C |

Hazards
- GHS labelling
| Pictograms | (GHS07: Exclamation mark) |
| Signal word | Warning |
| Hazard statements | H315, H319, H335 |
| Precautionary statements | P261, P264, P271, P280, P302+P352, P304+P340, P305+P351+P338, P312, P321, P332+P313, P337+P313, P362, P403+P233, P405, P501 |
- Except where otherwise noted, data are given for materials in their standard state (at 25 °C [77 °F], 100 kPa). Infobox references

3-Methylhistidine (3-MH) is a post-translationally modified amino acid which is excreted in human urine. Urinary concentration of 3-methylhistidine is a biomarker for skeletal muscle protein breakdown in humans who have been subject to muscle injury. Urinary 3-methylhistidine concentrations are also elevated from consumption of soy-based products and meat, particularly chicken.

== Biochemistry ==
3-Methylhistidine is a metabolic product that is produced in the body via the enzymatic methylation of histidine during peptide bond synthesis and the methylation of actin and myosin.

=== Detection in body fluids ===
The normal concentration of 3-methylhistidine in the urine of healthy adult humans has been detected and quantified in a range of 3.63–69.27 micromoles per millimole (μmol/mmol) of creatinine, with most studies reporting the average urinary concentration between 15 and 20 μmol/mmol of creatinine. The average concentration of 3-methylhistidine in human blood plasma has been detected and quantified at 2.85 micromolar (μM) with a range of 0.0–5.9 μM. The average concentration of 3-methylhistidine in human cerebrospinal fluid (CSF) has been detected and quantified at 3.82 μM with a range of 1.39–6.25 μM.
