= Carboxy-lyases =

Class of enzymes, carbon–carbon lyases

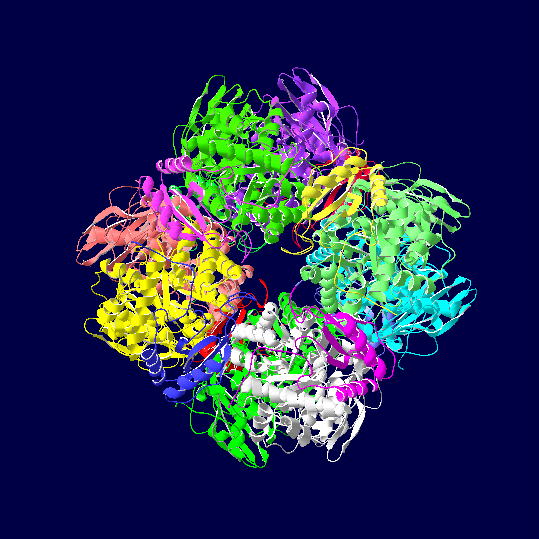
Carboxy-lyase

Carboxy-lyases, also known as decarboxylases, are carbon–carbon lyases that add or remove a carboxyl group from organic compounds. These enzymes catalyze the decarboxylation of amino acids and alpha-keto acids.

== Classification and nomenclature ==
Carboxy-lyases are categorized under EC number 4.1.1. Usually, they are named after the substrate whose decarboxylation they catalyze, for example pyruvate decarboxylase catalyzes the decarboxylation of pyruvate.

== Examples ==
- Aromatic-L-amino-acid decarboxylase
- Glutamate decarboxylase
- Histidine decarboxylase
- Ornithine decarboxylase
- Phosphoenolpyruvate carboxylase
- Pyruvate decarboxylase
- RuBisCO – the only carboxylase that leads to a net fixation of carbon dioxide
- Uridine monophosphate synthetase
- Uroporphyrinogen III decarboxylase
- enoyl-CoA carboxylases/reductases (ECRs)

== See also ==
- Enzymes
- Lyases
- List of EC numbers of enzymes belonging to category EC 4.1
