= Glycerate dehydrogenase =

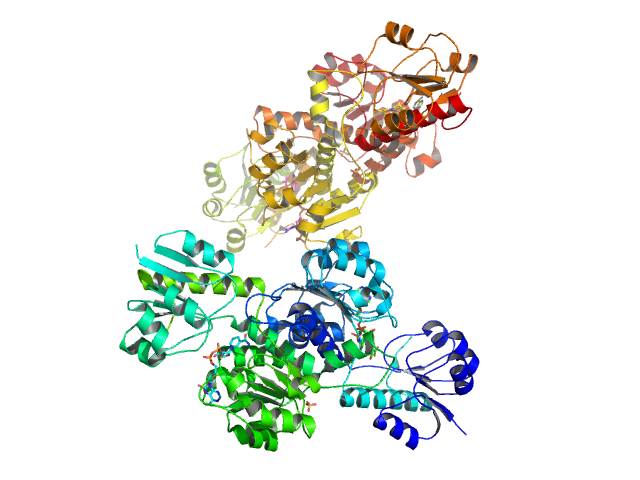
- Glyoxylate reductase/Hydroxypyruvate reductase. Quaternary structure of 2 homodimers of GRHPR bound to NADPH and (D)-glycerate.

Identifiers
- EC no.: 1.1.1.29
- CAS no.: 9028-37-9

Databases
- BRENDA: enzyme data
- ExPASy: NiceZyme view
- KEGG: enzyme entry
- MetaCyc: metabolic pathway
- Rhea: reactions
- PDB structures: RCSB PDB PDBe PDBsum
- Gene Ontology: AmiGO / QuickGO
Search
- PMC: articles
- PubMed: articles
- NCBI: proteins

In enzymology, a glycerate dehydrogenase (EC 1.1.1.29) is an enzyme that catalyzes the chemical reaction

(R)-glyceric acid
+ NAD^{+}
H^{+}
H^{+}
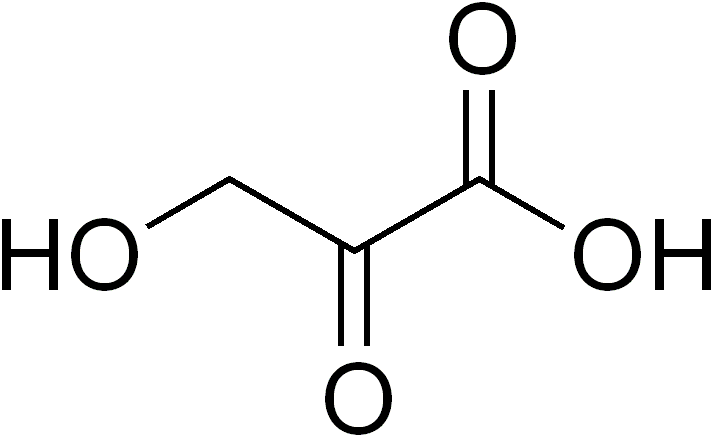
hydroxypyruvic acid
+ NADH

The two substrates of this enzyme are (R)-glyceric acid and oxidised nicotinamide adenine dinucleotide (NAD^{+}). Its products are hydroxypyruvic acid, reduced NADH, and a proton. These enzymes can catalyze the reverse reaction as well. That is, hydroxypyruvate, NADH, and H^{+} can act as the substrates while (R)-glycerate and NAD^{+} are formed as products. Additionally, NADPH can take the place of NADH in this reaction, in the case of the related hydroxypyruvate reductase (EC 1.1.1.81) enzyme class.

This enzyme belongs to the family of oxidoreductases, specifically those acting on the CH-OH group of donor with NAD^{+} or NADP^{+} as acceptor. The systematic name of this enzyme class is (R)-glycerate:NAD^{+} oxidoreductase. Other names in common use include D-glycerate dehydrogenase, and hydroxypyruvate reductase (due to the reversibility of the reaction). This enzyme participates in glycine, serine and threonine metabolism and glyoxylate and dicarboxylate metabolism.

== Enzyme structure ==
This class of enzyme is part of a larger superfamily of enzymes known as D-2-hydroxy-acid dehydrogenases. Many organisms from Hyphomicrobium methylovorum to humans have some form of the glycerate dehydrogenase protein. There are currently several structures that have been solved for this class of enzyme including those for the two mentioned above with PDB access code PDB: 1GDH, D-glycerate dehydrogenase, and the human homolog Glyoxylate reductase/Hydroxypyruvate reductase (GRHPR), PDB: 2WWR.

These studies have yielded a better understanding of the structure and function of these enzymes. It has been shown that these proteins are homodimeric enzymes. This means that 2 identical proteins are linked forming one larger complex. The active site is found in each subunit between the two distinct α/β/α globular domains, the substrate binding domain and the coenzyme binding domain. This coenzyme binding domain is slightly larger than the substrate binding domain and contains a NAD(P) Rossmann fold along with the "dimerisation loop" which holds the two subunits of the homodimer together. In addition to linking the two proteins together, the "dimerisation loop" of each subunit protrudes into the active site of the other subunit increasing the specificity of the enzyme, by preventing the binding of pyruvate as a substrate. Hydroxypyruvate is still able to bind to the active site due to extra stabilization from hydrogen bonds with neighboring amino-acid residues.

== Glyoxylate reductase/Hydroxypyruvate reductase ==
=== Biological relevance ===
Glyoxylate reductase/Hydroxypyruvate reductase (GRHPR) is the glycerate dehydrogenase found, predominantly in the liver, of humans encoded by the gene GRHPR. Under physiological conditions, the production of D-glycerate is favored over its consumption as a substrate. It can then be converted to 2-phosphoglycerate, which can then enter into glycolysis, gluconeogenesis, or the serine pathway.

As the name suggests, in addition to the glycerate dehydrogenase and hydroxypyruvate reductase activity (EC 1.1.1.81), the protein also exhibits glyoxylate reductase activity (EC 1.1.1.79). The ability of GRHPR to reduce glyoxylate to glycolate is found in other glycerate dehydrogenase homologs as well. This is important for the intracellular regulation of glyoxylate levels, which has important medical ramifications. As mentioned earlier, these enzymes have the ability to use either NADH or NADPH as the coenzyme. This gives them an advantage over other enzymes that can only use a single form of the coenzyme. Lactate dehydrogenase(LDH) is one such enzyme that directly competes with GRHPR for substrates and converts glyoxylate to oxalate. However, due to the relatively large concentration of NADPH compared to NADH under normal cellular concentration, the GRHPR activity is greater than that of LDH so the production of glycolate is dominant.

=== Medical relevance ===
Primary hyperoxaluria is a condition that results in the overproduction of oxalate which combines with calcium to generate calcium oxalate, the main component of kidney stones. Primary Hyperoxaluria type 2 is caused by any one of several mutations to the GRHPR gene and results in the accumulation of calcium oxalate in the kidneys, bones, and many other organs. The mutations to GRHPR prevent it from converting glyoxylate to glycolate, leading to a build-up of glyoxylate. This excess glyoxylate is then oxidized by lactate dehydrogenase to produce the oxalate that is characteristic of hyperoxaluria.
