= Serine—glyoxylate transaminase =

Class of enzymes

Serine-glyoxylate transaminase

Identifiers
- EC no.: 2.6.1.45
- CAS no.: 37259-57-7

Databases
- IntEnz: IntEnz view
- BRENDA: BRENDA entry
- ExPASy: NiceZyme view
- KEGG: KEGG entry
- MetaCyc: metabolic pathway
- PRIAM: profile
- PDB structures: RCSB PDB PDBe PDBsum
- Gene Ontology: AmiGO / QuickGO
Search
- PMC: articles
- PubMed: articles
- NCBI: proteins

Serine-glyoxylate transaminase (EC 2.6.1.45) is a pyridoxal phosphate-dependent enzyme that catalyzes the rversible chemical reaction

serine
+
glyoxylic acid
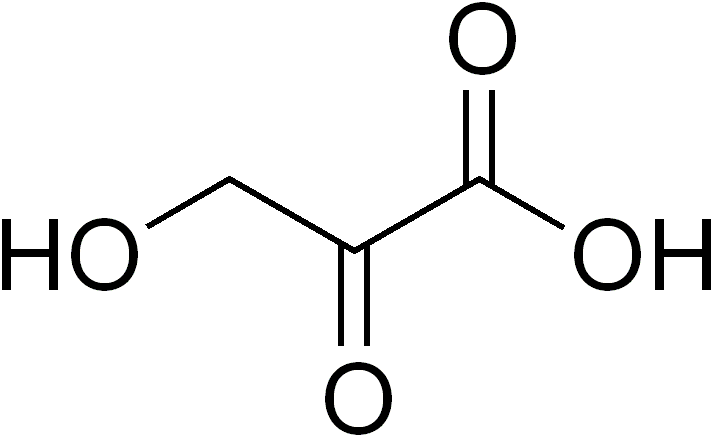
hydroxypyruvic acid
+
glycine

The two substrates of this enzyme found in plants including wleat and kidney bean are L-serine and glyoxylic acid. Its products are hydroxypyruvic acid and glycine.

This enzyme is a transferase, specifically a transaminase, which transfer nitrogenous groups. The systematic name of this enzyme class is L-serine:glyoxylate aminotransferase. This enzyme participates in glycine, serine and threonine metabolism.
