= Glyoxylate fermentation =

Metabolic pathway

Glyoxylate fermentation is an anaerobic metabolic pathway found in certain bacteria that allows the conversion of glyoxylate into smaller compounds such as carbon dioxide, hydrogen, glycolate, and tartronic semialdehyde. It is distinct from the glyoxylate cycle and plays an important role in energy metabolism in anaerobic (oxygen-limited) environments including marine sediments, anaerobic soil layers, and digestive tracts of various organisms.

The process involves distinct biochemical pathways, occurs in specific environmental niches, and has potential impacts on carbon cycling and nutrient recycling in natural environments. Research history dating back to the 1940s has established its fundamental role in microbial metabolism, particularly in anaerobic conditions across several bacterial species.

== Biochemical process ==
Glyoxylate fermentation begins with the decarboxylation of glyoxylate, catalyzed by the enzyme glyoxylate decarboxylase. The reaction yields tartronic semialdehyde and carbon dioxide. The resulting intermediate can either be reduced to glycerate or further transformed through additional enzymatic steps, depending on the organism's metabolic state.

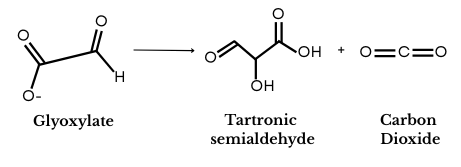
Glyoxylate fermentation pathway in Streptococcus allantoicus

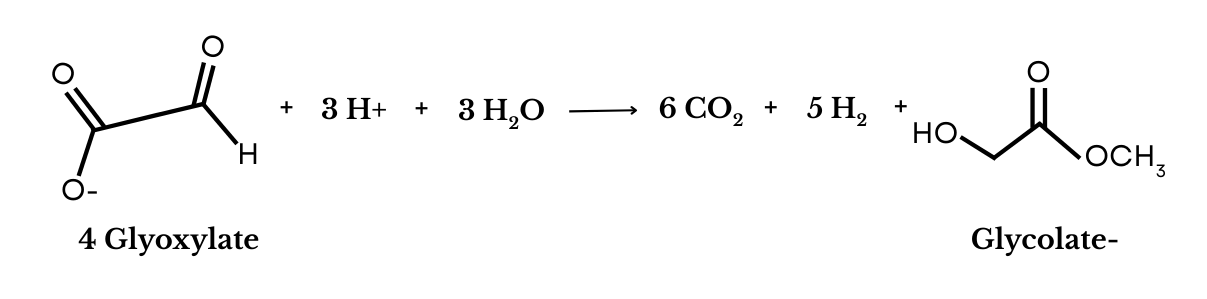
Glyoxylate fermentation pathway in unclassified gram-negative bacteria

Though the glyoxylate fermentation pathway had previously been identified and studied before in a gram-positive bacterium, it has more recently been identified in an unclassified gram-negative bacterium. The proposed pathway of the study is outlined in the figure to the right.

== Characteristics, environments, and evolution ==
Two main variations of the glyoxylate fermentation pathway have been documented:

1. In gram-positive bacteria (e.g., Streptococcus allantoicus): Produces tartronic semialdehyde and CO_{2} as primary products. S. allantoicus is well known for its ability to ferment allantoin, which is a diureide of glyoxylic acid. So, fermentation of allantoin can be interpreted as glyoxylate fermentation.
2. In certain gram-negative bacteria (Strain PerGlx1, possibly affiliated with the family Bacteriodaceae): Converts glyoxylate to carbon dioxide, hydrogen, and glycolate.

== Research history ==
Glyoxylate fermentation was first reported in 1943 by H. A. Barker, who demonstrated that S. allantoicus could decarboxylate glyoxylate and metabolize allantoin. Subsequent work by Valentine, Drucker, and Wolfe (1964) characterized the pathway’s enzymatic mechanism.

In 1991, Friedrich and Schink isolated a novel strictly anaerobic gram-negative bacterium, strain PerGlx1, capable of fermenting glyoxylate to CO₂, hydrogen, and glycolate. The ability to ferment allantoin contributed to the species name of S. allantoicus. Further investigation by Valentine, Drucker, and Wolfe elucidated the biochemical mechanism of glyoxylate fermentation in S. allantoicus.
