= 3-ethylmalate synthase =

Class of enzymes

Identifiers
- EC no.: 2.3.3.7
- CAS no.: 9024-01-5

Databases
- IntEnz: IntEnz view
- BRENDA: BRENDA entry
- ExPASy: NiceZyme view
- KEGG: KEGG entry
- MetaCyc: metabolic pathway
- PRIAM: profile
- PDB structures: RCSB PDB PDBe PDBsum
- Gene Ontology: AmiGO / QuickGO
Search
- PMC: articles
- PubMed: articles
- NCBI: proteins

In enzymology, a 3-ethylmalate synthase (EC 2.3.3.7) is an enzyme that catalyzes the chemical reaction

butanoyl-CoA + H_{2}O + glyoxylate $\rightleftharpoons$ 3-ethylmalate + CoA

The 3 substrates of this enzyme are butanoyl-CoA, H_{2}O, and glyoxylate, whereas its two products are 3-ethylmalate and CoA.

This enzyme belongs to the family of transferases, specifically those acyltransferases that convert acyl groups into alkyl groups on transfer. The systematic name of this enzyme class is butanoyl-CoA:glyoxylate C-butanoyltransferase (thioester-hydrolysing, 1-carboxypropyl-forming). Other names in common use include 2-ethyl-3-hydroxybutanedioate synthase, and 3-ethylmalate glyoxylate-lyase (CoA-butanoylating). This enzyme participates in glyoxylate and dicarboxylate metabolism.
