= 3-propylmalate synthase =

Class of enzymes

Identifiers
- EC no.: 2.3.3.12
- CAS no.: 37290-62-3

Databases
- IntEnz: IntEnz view
- BRENDA: BRENDA entry
- ExPASy: NiceZyme view
- KEGG: KEGG entry
- MetaCyc: metabolic pathway
- PRIAM: profile
- PDB structures: RCSB PDB PDBe PDBsum
- Gene Ontology: AmiGO / QuickGO
Search
- PMC: articles
- PubMed: articles
- NCBI: proteins

In enzymology, a 3-propylmalate synthase (EC 2.3.3.12) is an enzyme that catalyzes the chemical reaction

pentanoyl-CoA + H_{2}O + glyoxylate $\rightleftharpoons$ 3-propylmalate + CoA

The 3 substrates of this enzyme are pentanoyl-CoA, H_{2}O, and glyoxylate, whereas its two products are 3-propylmalate and CoA.

This enzyme belongs to the family of transferases, specifically those acyltransferases that convert acyl groups into alkyl groups on transfer. The systematic name of this enzyme class is pentanoyl-CoA:glyoxylate C-pentanoyltransferase (thioester-hydrolysing, 1-carboxybutyl-forming). Other names in common use include 3-(n-propyl)-malate synthase, 3-propylmalate glyoxylate-lyase (CoA-pentanoylating), beta-n-propylmalate synthase, and n-propylmalate synthase. This enzyme participates in glyoxylate and dicarboxylate metabolism.
