= CHK-336 =

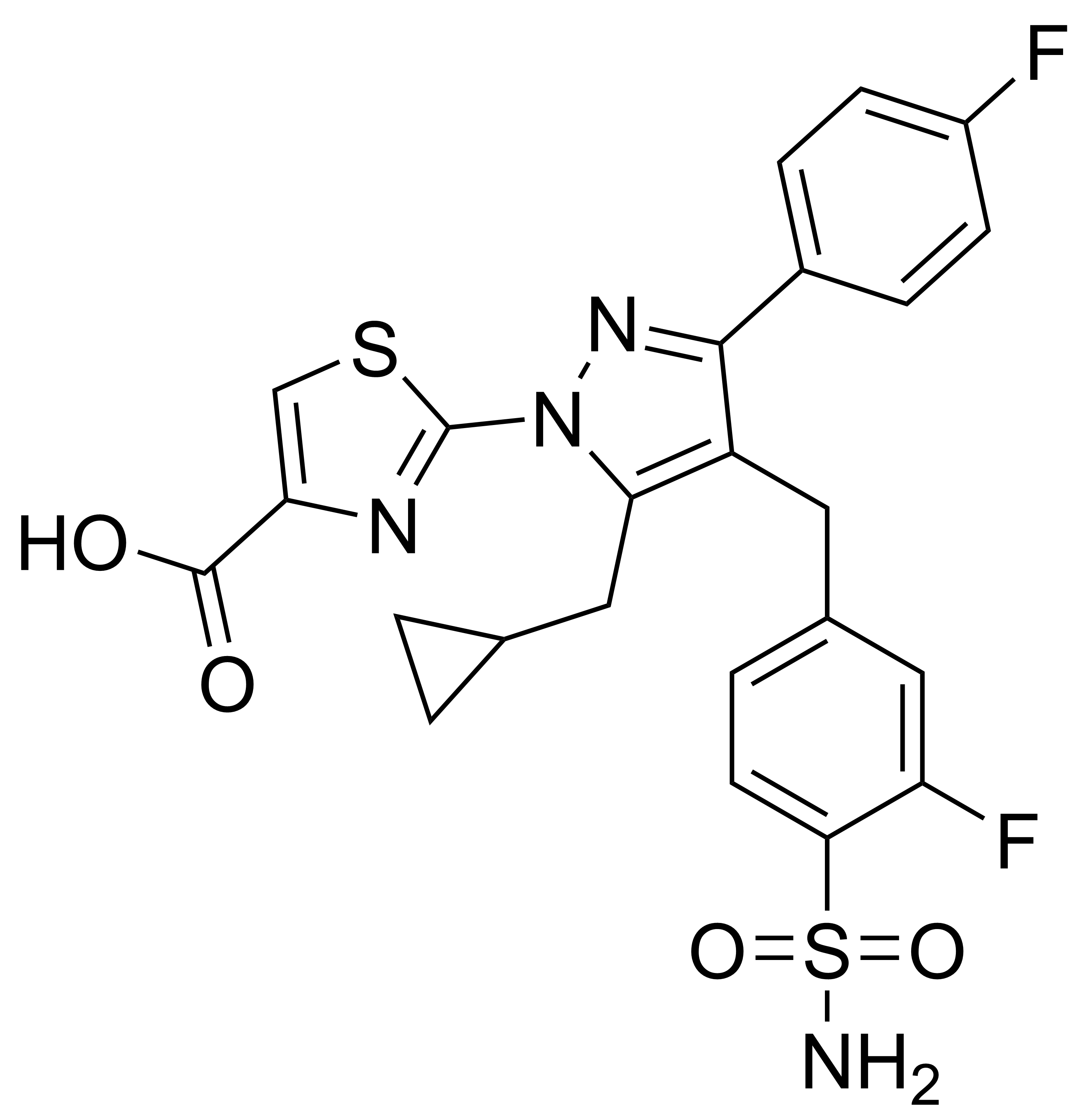

Names
- IUPAC name 2-[5-(cyclopropylmethyl)-3-(4-fluorophenyl)-4-[(3-fluoro-4-sulfamoylphenyl)methyl]pyrazol-1-yl]-1,3-thiazole-4-carboxylic acid

Identifiers
CAS Number	2743436-86-2
3D model (JSmol)	Interactive image
ChemSpider	129432022
PubChem CID	162358463
UNII	7UP4ZPR62H
- InChI: InChI=1S/C24H20F2N4O4S2/c25-16-6-4-15(5-7-16)22-17(9-14-3-8-21(18(26)10-14)36(27,33)34)20(11-13-1-2-13)30(29-22)24-28-19(12-35-24)23(31)32/h3-8,10,12-13H,1-2,9,11H2,(H,31,32)(H2,27,33,34) Key: XAHAUTPHLZAEKK-UHFFFAOYSA-N
- SMILES: NS(=O)(=O)C1=C(F)C=C(CC2=C(CC3CC3)N(N=C2C4=CC=C(F)C=C4)C5=NC(=CS5)C(O)=O)C=C1

Properties
Chemical formula	C_{24}H_{20}F_{2}N_{4}O_{4}S_{2}
Molar mass	530.56 g·mol^{−1}
- Except where otherwise noted, data are given for materials in their standard state (at 25 °C [77 °F], 100 kPa). Infobox references

CHK-336 is a small molecule lactate dehydrogenase inhibitor developed by Chinook Therapeutics (a Novartis Company). CHK-336 is a first-in-class, orally available, and liver-targeted molecule and is being investigated for the treatment of primary hyperoxaluria. By inhibiting the final and only committed step in hepatic oxalate synthesis, CHK-336 could in principle treat all forms of primary hyperoxaluria.

In April 2022, a phase 1 clinical trial of CHK-336 was initiated. This trial was designed to evaluate the safety, tolerability, and pharmacokinetic profile of CHK-336 in healthy volunteers. CHK-336 was found to be generally well-tolerated in single doses up to 500 mg and multiple doses up to 60 mg for 14 days. Pharmacokinetic evaluation supported once-daily dosing, and use of a ^{13}C_{2}-glycolate tracer established proof-of-mechanism that CHK-336 blocks hepatic oxalate production. This clinical trial was paused in April 2023 upon one serious adverse event of anaphylaxis in the 125 mg multiple ascending dose cohort.

== Mechanism of action ==
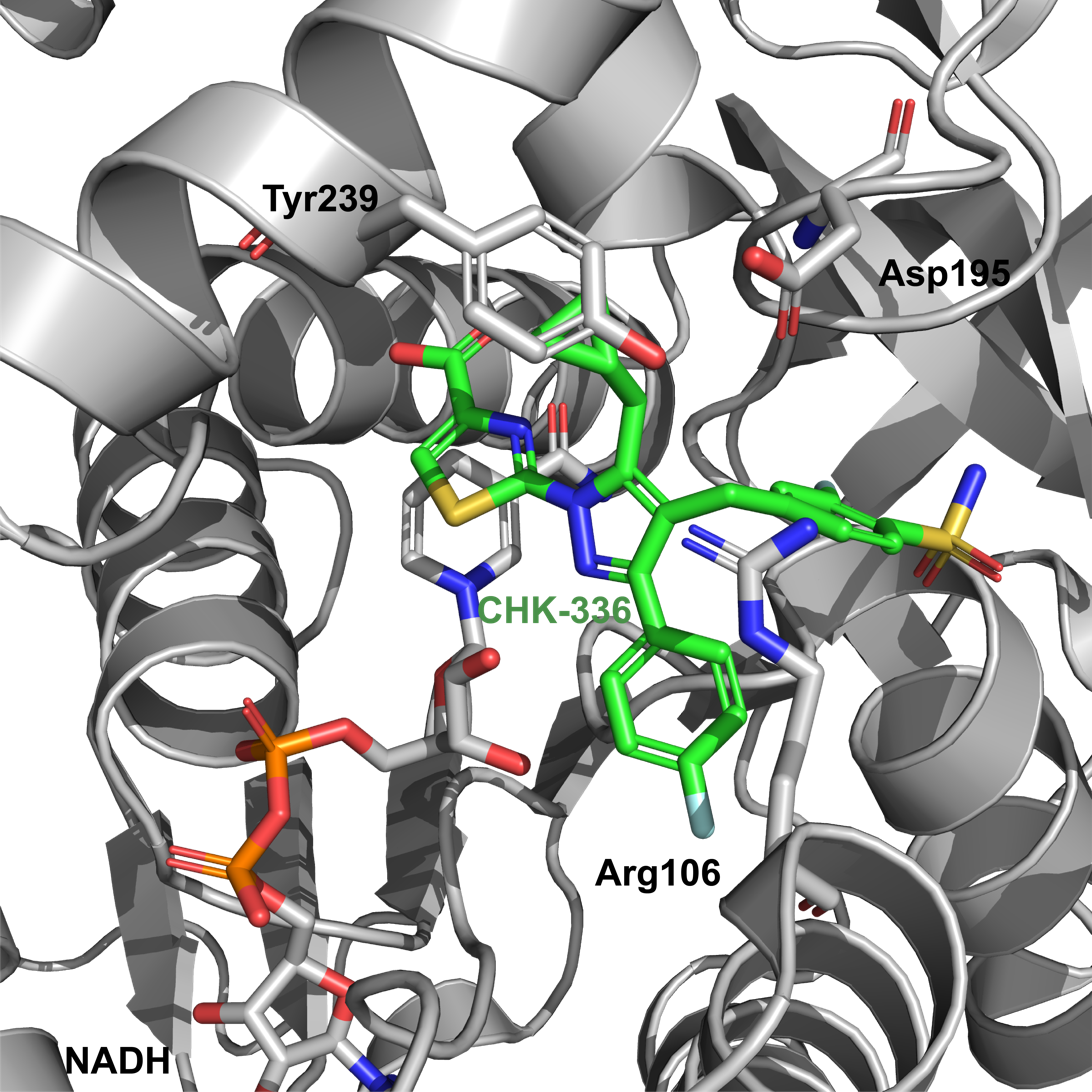
Human Lactate Dehydrogenase A in Complex with Inhibitor CHK-336 (PDB: 8FW6). CHK-336 shown in green. NADH co-factor shown in bottom left. Residues Arg106, Asp195, Tyr239 labeled.

To facilitate hepatic uptake via organic anion transporting polypeptides (OATPs), a thiazole carboxylic acid CHK-569 was chosen as the starting point in the development of CHK-336. Compounds in this series display slow-off kinetics with respect to lactate dehydrogenase A (LDHA) binding. Crystallography studies revealed that compounds in this series induce a strong interaction network between residues Arg106−Asp195−Tyr239 that drives this slow-off phenotype. In LDHA-knockout mice, CHK-336 concentrations are 10-fold lower 24 h after dosing, suggesting that target-mediated drug deposition (TMDD) mediates the long liver half-life of CHK-336.

In vivo efficacy of CHK-336 was evaluated by assessing conversion of a ^{13}C_{2}-glycolate tracer to ^{13}C_{2}-oxalate. CHK-336 reduces urinary oxalate excretion in mouse models of both primary hyperoxaluria 1 (Agxt knockout) and 2 (Grhpr knockout).
