= C3H4O4 =

The molecular formula C_{3}H_{4}O_{4} (molar mass: 104.06 g/mol) may refer to:

- Hydroxypyruvic acid, a pyruvic acid derivative
- Malonic acid, a dicarboxylic acid
- Tartronic acid semialdehyde, the uronic acid of glyceraldehyde
- Monomethyl oxalate, a compound that cannot be isolated but is an intermediate in synthesizing or hydrolyzing dimethyl oxalate
