= Glyoxylate oxidase =

glyoxylate oxidase

Identifiers
- EC no.: 1.2.3.5
- CAS no.: 37251-03-9

Databases
- IntEnz: IntEnz view
- BRENDA: BRENDA entry
- ExPASy: NiceZyme view
- KEGG: KEGG entry
- MetaCyc: metabolic pathway
- PRIAM: profile
- PDB structures: RCSB PDB PDBe PDBsum
- Gene Ontology: AmiGO / QuickGO
Search
- PMC: articles
- PubMed: articles
- NCBI: proteins

In enzymology, glyoxylate oxidase (EC 1.2.3.5) is an enzyme that catalyzes the chemical reaction

glyoxylic acid
+ H_{2}O
O_{2}
H_{2}O_{2}
O_{2}
H_{2}O_{2}
oxalic acid

The three substrates of this enzyme are glyoxylic acid, water, and oxygen. Its products are oxalic acid and hydrogen peroxide.

This enzyme belongs to the family of oxidoreductases, specifically those acting on the aldehyde or oxo group of donor with oxygen as acceptor. The systematic name of this enzyme class is glyoxylate:oxygen oxidoreductase. This enzyme participates in glyoxylate and dicarboxylate metabolism.
