= 2-hydroxy-3-oxopropionate reductase =

InterPro Family

Identifiers
- EC no.: 1.1.1.60
- CAS no.: 9028-68-6

Databases
- IntEnz: IntEnz view
- BRENDA: BRENDA entry
- ExPASy: NiceZyme view
- KEGG: KEGG entry
- MetaCyc: metabolic pathway
- PRIAM: profile
- PDB structures: RCSB PDB PDBe PDBsum
- Gene Ontology: AmiGO / QuickGO
Search
- PMC: articles
- PubMed: articles
- NCBI: proteins

In enzymology, a 2-hydroxy-3-oxopropionate reductase (EC 1.1.1.60) is an enzyme that catalyzes the chemical reaction

D-glyceric acid
+ NAD^{+}
H^{+}
H^{+}
2-hydroxy-3-oxopropanoic acid
+ NADH

The two substrates of this enzyme are D-glyceric acid and oxidised nicotinamide adenine dinucleotide (NAD^{+}). Its products are 2-hydroxy-3-oxopropanoate, reduced NADH, and a proton. The enzyme can alternatively use nicotinamide adenine dinucleotide phosphate as its cofactor.

This enzyme belongs to the family of oxidoreductases, specifically those acting on the CH-OH group of donor with NAD^{+} or NADP^{+} as acceptor. The systematic name of this enzyme class is (R)-glycerate:NAD(P)^{+} oxidoreductase. This enzyme is also called tartronate semialdehyde reductase. This enzyme participates in glyoxylate and dicarboxylate metabolism.

== Structural studies ==
As of late 2007, only one structure has been solved for this class of enzymes, with the PDB accession code 1YB4.
