= 2-hydroxy-3-oxoadipate synthase =

Class of enzymes

Identifiers
- EC no.: 2.2.1.5
- CAS no.: 9054-72-2

Databases
- IntEnz: IntEnz view
- BRENDA: BRENDA entry
- ExPASy: NiceZyme view
- KEGG: KEGG entry
- MetaCyc: metabolic pathway
- PRIAM: profile
- PDB structures: RCSB PDB PDBe PDBsum
- Gene Ontology: AmiGO / QuickGO
Search
- PMC: articles
- PubMed: articles
- NCBI: proteins

2-hydroxy-3-oxoadipate synthase (EC 2.2.1.5) is an enzyme that catalyzes the following chemical reaction:

α-Ketoglutaric acid
+
Glyoxylic acid
CO_{2}
2-Hydroxy-3-oxoadipic acid

The two substrates of this enzyme are α-ketoglutaric acid and glyoxylic acid. Its products are 2-hydroxy-3-oxoadipic acid and carbon dioxide. The product can spontaneously decarboxylate to give 5-hydroxy-4-oxo-pentanoic acid:

2-Hydroxy-3-oxoadipic acid
CO_{2}
5-hydroxy-4-oxo-pentanoic acid

This enzyme belongs to the family of transferases, specifically those transferring aldehyde or ketonic groups (transaldolases and transketolases, respectively). Other names in common use include 2-hydroxy-3-oxoadipate glyoxylate-lyase (carboxylating), alpha-ketoglutaric-glyoxylic carboligase, and oxoglutarate: glyoxylate carboligase. This enzyme participates in glyoxylate and dicarboxylate metabolism. It employs one cofactor, thiamin diphosphate.
