= Glyoxylate dehydrogenase (acylating) =

glyoxylate dehydrogenase (acylating)

Identifiers
- EC no.: 1.2.1.17
- CAS no.: 9028-96-0

Databases
- IntEnz: IntEnz view
- BRENDA: BRENDA entry
- ExPASy: NiceZyme view
- KEGG: KEGG entry
- MetaCyc: metabolic pathway
- PRIAM: profile
- PDB structures: RCSB PDB PDBe PDBsum
- Gene Ontology: AmiGO / QuickGO
Search
- PMC: articles
- PubMed: articles
- NCBI: proteins

In enzymology, a glyoxylate dehydrogenase (acylating) (EC 1.2.1.17) is an enzyme that catalyzes the chemical reaction

glyoxylate + CoA + NADP^{+} $\rightleftharpoons$ oxalyl-CoA + NADPH + H^{+}

The 3 substrates of this enzyme are glyoxylate, CoA, and NADP^{+}, whereas its 3 products are oxalyl-CoA, NADPH, and H^{+}.

This enzyme belongs to the family of oxidoreductases, specifically those acting on the aldehyde or oxo group of donor with NAD+ or NADP+ as acceptor. The systematic name of this enzyme class is glyoxylate:NADP+ oxidoreductase (CoA-oxalylating). This enzyme participates in glyoxylate and dicarboxylate metabolism.
