= HuS-E/2 cells =

HuS-E/2 cells are immortalized primary human hepatocytes that were isolated from the discarded old liver tissue obtained from a 9-year-old male patient with primary hyperoxaluria (after the approval of ethical committee and required written consent) who had undergone liver transplantation to receive a new liver. Hepatocytes were transduced with hTERT and HPV-E6E7 oncogenes. This immortalized hepatocyte cell line showed similar characteristics to primary hepatocytes, and was beneficial in the study of Hepatitis C and B viruses.
