= Glycine transaminase =

Identifiers
- EC no.: 2.6.1.4
- CAS no.: 9032-99-9

Databases
- IntEnz: IntEnz view
- BRENDA: BRENDA entry
- ExPASy: NiceZyme view
- KEGG: KEGG entry
- MetaCyc: metabolic pathway
- PRIAM: profile
- PDB structures: RCSB PDB PDBe PDBsum
- Gene Ontology: AmiGO / QuickGO
Search
- PMC: articles
- PubMed: articles
- NCBI: proteins

Glycine transaminase (EC 2.6.1.4) is an enzyme characterised from liver that catalyzes a reversible chemical reaction to interconvert glycine and α-ketoglutaric acid with glycolic acid and L-glutamic acid:

glycine
+
α-ketoglutaric acid
glyoxylic acid
+
glutamic acid

Although reversible, the reaction strongly favours the synthesis of glycine. This enzyme is a transferase, specifically the transaminases, which transfer nitrogenous groups. The systematic name of this enzyme class is glycine:2-oxoglutarate aminotransferase. Other names in common use include glutamic-glyoxylic transaminase, glycine aminotransferase, glyoxylate-glutamic transaminase, L-glutamate:glyoxylate aminotransferase, and glyoxylate-glutamate aminotransferase. It employs one cofactor, pyridoxal phosphate.
