= N-formylmethionylaminoacyl-tRNA deformylase =

Identifiers
- EC no.: 3.5.1.27
- CAS no.: 37289-08-0

Databases
- IntEnz: IntEnz view
- BRENDA: BRENDA entry
- ExPASy: NiceZyme view
- KEGG: KEGG entry
- MetaCyc: metabolic pathway
- PRIAM: profile
- PDB structures: RCSB PDB PDBe PDBsum
- Gene Ontology: AmiGO / QuickGO
Search
- PMC: articles
- PubMed: articles
- NCBI: proteins

In enzymology, a N-formylmethionylaminoacyl-tRNA deformylase (EC 3.5.1.27) is an enzyme that catalyzes the chemical reaction

N-formyl-L-methionylaminoacyl-tRNA + H_{2}O $\rightleftharpoons$ formate + L-methionylaminoacyl-tRNA

Thus, the two substrates of this enzyme are N-formyl-L-methionylaminoacyl-tRNA and H_{2}O, whereas its two products are formate and L-methionylaminoacyl-tRNA.

This enzyme belongs to the family of hydrolases, those acting on carbon-nitrogen bonds other than peptide bonds, specifically in linear amides. The systematic name of this enzyme class is N-formyl-L-methionylaminoacyl-tRNA amidohydrolase. This enzyme participates in glyoxylate and dicarboxylate metabolism.

== Structural studies ==
As of late 2007, 3 structures have been solved for this class of enzymes, with PDB accession codes 1BSJ, 1BSK, and 1LMH.
