= Dihydroxyfumarate decarboxylase =

Class of enzymes

dihydroxyfumarate decarboxylase

Identifiers
- EC no.: 4.1.1.54
- CAS no.: 37289-51-3

Databases
- BRENDA: enzyme data
- ExPASy: NiceZyme view
- KEGG: enzyme entry
- MetaCyc: metabolic pathway
- Rhea: reactions
- PDB structures: RCSB PDB PDBe PDBsum
- Gene Ontology: AmiGO / QuickGO
Search
- PMC: articles
- PubMed: articles
- NCBI: proteins

The enzyme dihydroxyfumarate decarboxylase (EC 4.1.1.54), characterised from mammalian liver, catalyzes the decarboxylation of dihydroxyfumaric acid to tartronic acid semialdehyde and carbon dioxide:

dihydroxyfumaric acid
CO_{2}
tartronic acid semialdehyde

This enzyme is a lyase, specifically a carboxy-lyase, which cleave carbon-carbon bonds. The systematic name of this enzyme class is dihydroxyfumarate carboxy-lyase (tartronate-semialdehyde-forming). This enzyme is also called dihydroxyfumarate carboxy-lyase.
