= Tartronate-semialdehyde synthase =

Class of enzymes

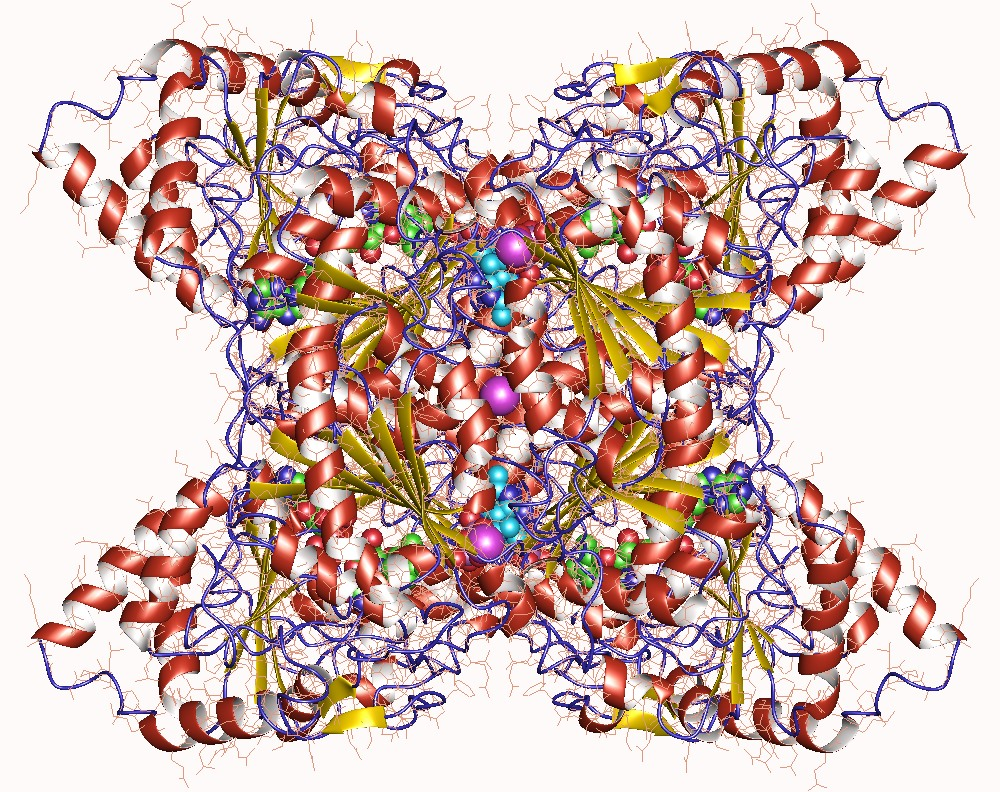
- Tartronate-semialdehyde synthase homotetramer, E.Coli

Identifiers
- EC no.: 4.1.1.47
- CAS no.: 9027-24-1

Databases
- BRENDA: enzyme data
- ExPASy: NiceZyme view
- KEGG: enzyme entry
- MetaCyc: metabolic pathway
- Rhea: reactions
- PDB structures: RCSB PDB PDBe PDBsum
- Gene Ontology: AmiGO / QuickGO
Search
- PMC: articles
- PubMed: articles
- NCBI: proteins

Tartronate-semialdehyde synthase (EC 4.1.1.47) is an enzyme characterised from Escherichia coli that catalyzes a reaction that combines two molecles of glyoxylic acid to one of tartronic acid semialdehyde, with carbon dioxide as a byproduct:

2
glyoxylic acid
CO_{2}
tartronic acid semialdehyde

The enzyme is a flavoprotein that uses thiamine pyrophosphate as a cofactor. It has been of interest in industrial production of useful chemicals from two-carbon feedstocks.

This enzyme is a lyase, specifically a carboxy-lyase, which cleave carbon-carbon bonds. The systematic name of this enzyme class is glyoxylate carboxy-lyase (dimerizing tartronate-semialdehyde-forming). Other names in use include tartronate semialdehyde carboxylase, glyoxylate carbo-ligase, glyoxylic carbo-ligase, hydroxymalonic semialdehyde carboxylase, tartronic semialdehyde carboxylase, glyoxalate carboligase, and glyoxylate carboxy-lyase (dimerizing).
