= Malyl-CoA lyase =

malyl-CoA lyase

Identifiers
- EC no.: 4.1.3.24
- CAS no.: 37290-67-8

Databases
- IntEnz: IntEnz view
- BRENDA: BRENDA entry
- ExPASy: NiceZyme view
- KEGG: KEGG entry
- MetaCyc: metabolic pathway
- PRIAM: profile
- PDB structures: RCSB PDB PDBe PDBsum
- Gene Ontology: AmiGO / QuickGO
Search
- PMC: articles
- PubMed: articles
- NCBI: proteins

The enzyme malyl-CoA lyase (EC 4.1.3.24) catalyzes the chemical reaction

(3S)-3-carboxy-3-hydroxypropanoyl-CoA $\rightleftharpoons$ acetyl-CoA + glyoxylate

This enzyme belongs to the family of lyases, specifically the oxo-acid-lyases, which cleave carbon-carbon bonds. The systematic name of this enzyme class is (3S)-3-carboxy-3-hydroxypropanoyl-CoA glyoxylate-lyase (acetyl-CoA-forming). Other names in common use include malyl-coenzyme A lyase, and (3S)-3-carboxy-3-hydroxypropanoyl-CoA glyoxylate-lyase. This enzyme participates in glyoxylate and dicarboxylate metabolism.
