= Hydroxypyruvate isomerase =

hydroxypyruvate isomerase

Identifiers
- EC no.: 5.3.1.22
- CAS no.: 74812-48-9

Databases
- IntEnz: IntEnz view
- BRENDA: BRENDA entry
- ExPASy: NiceZyme view
- KEGG: KEGG entry
- MetaCyc: metabolic pathway
- PRIAM: profile
- PDB structures: RCSB PDB PDBe PDBsum
- Gene Ontology: AmiGO / QuickGO
Search
- PMC: articles
- PubMed: articles
- NCBI: proteins

In enzymology, a hydroxypyruvate isomerase (EC 5.3.1.22) is an enzyme that catalyzes the chemical reaction

hydroxypyruvate $\rightleftharpoons$ 2-hydroxy-3-oxopropanoate

Hence, this enzyme has one substrate, hydroxypyruvate, and one product, 2-hydroxy-3-oxopropanoate.

This enzyme belongs to the family of isomerases, specifically those intramolecular oxidoreductases interconverting aldoses and ketoses. The systematic name of this enzyme class is hydroxypyruvate aldose-ketose-isomerase. This enzyme participates in glyoxylate and dicarboxylate metabolism.
