= (S)-2-hydroxy-acid oxidase =

Class of enzymes

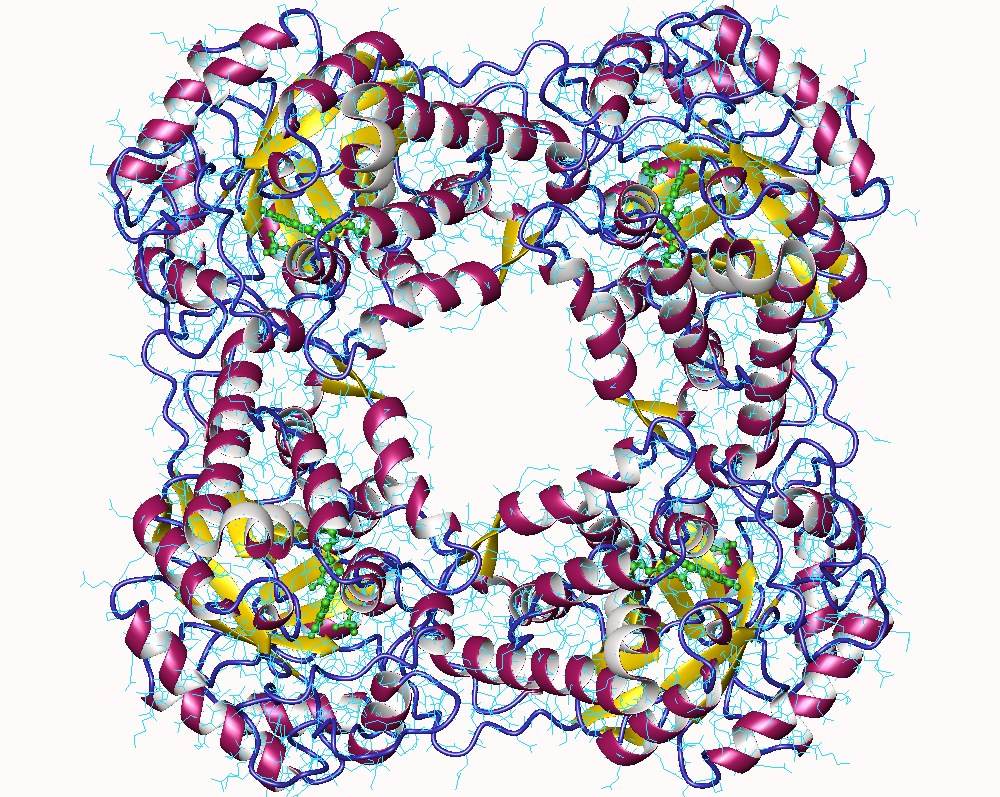
- Glycolate oxidase tetramer, Human

Identifiers
- EC no.: 1.1.3.15
- CAS no.: 9037-63-2

Databases
- BRENDA: enzyme data
- ExPASy: NiceZyme view
- KEGG: enzyme entry
- MetaCyc: metabolic pathway
- Rhea: reactions
- PDB structures: RCSB PDB PDBe PDBsum
- Gene Ontology: AmiGO / QuickGO
Search
- PMC: articles
- PubMed: articles
- NCBI: proteins

In enzymology, an (S)-2-hydroxy-acid oxidase (EC 1.1.3.15) is an enzyme that catalyzes the chemical reaction

(S)-2-hydroxy acid + O_{2} $\rightleftharpoons$ 2-oxo acid + H_{2}O_{2}

Thus, the two substrates of this enzyme are (S)-2-hydroxy acid and O_{2}, whereas its two products are 2-oxo acid and H_{2}O_{2}.

This enzyme belongs to the family of oxidoreductases, specifically those acting on the CH-OH group of donor with oxygen as acceptor. The systematic name of this enzyme class is (S)-2-hydroxy-acid:oxygen 2-oxidoreductase. Other names in common use include glycolate oxidase, hydroxy-acid oxidase A, hydroxy-acid oxidase B, oxidase, L-2-hydroxy acid, hydroxyacid oxidase A, L-alpha-hydroxy acid oxidase, and L-2-hydroxy acid oxidase. This enzyme participates in glyoxylate and dicarboxylate metabolism. It employs one cofactor, FMN.

== Structural studies ==
As of late 2007, 5 structures have been solved for this class of enzymes, with PDB accession codes PDB: 1AL7, PDB: 1AL8, PDB: 1GYL, PDB: 1TB3, and PDB: 2NZL.
