= Glycolaldehyde dehydrogenase =

glycolaldehyde dehydrogenase

Identifiers
- EC no.: 1.2.1.21
- CAS no.: 37250-89-8

Databases
- IntEnz: IntEnz view
- BRENDA: BRENDA entry
- ExPASy: NiceZyme view
- KEGG: KEGG entry
- MetaCyc: metabolic pathway
- PRIAM: profile
- PDB structures: RCSB PDB PDBe PDBsum
- Gene Ontology: AmiGO / QuickGO
Search
- PMC: articles
- PubMed: articles
- NCBI: proteins

In enzymology, glycolaldehyde dehydrogenase (EC 1.2.1.21) is an enzyme that catalyzes the chemical reaction

glycolaldehyde
+ NAD^{+}
H_{2}O
H^{+}
H_{2}O
H^{+}
glycolic acid
+ NADH

The three substrates of this enzyme are glycolaldehyde, oxidised nicotinamide adenine dinucleotide (NAD^{+}), and water. Its products are glycolic acid, reduced NADH, and a proton.

This enzyme belongs to the family of oxidoreductases, specifically those acting on the aldehyde or oxo group of donor with NAD+ or NADP+ as acceptor. The systematic name of this enzyme class is glycolaldehyde:NAD+ oxidoreductase. This enzyme is also called glycol aldehyde dehydrogenase. This enzyme participates in glyoxylate and dicarboxylate metabolism.

== Structural studies ==
As of late 2007, 3 structures have been solved for this class of enzymes, with PDB accession codes 2HG2, 2ILU, and 2IMP.
