= Oxalomalate lyase =

oxalomalate lyase

Identifiers
- EC no.: 4.1.3.13
- CAS no.: 37290-63-4

Databases
- IntEnz: IntEnz view
- BRENDA: BRENDA entry
- ExPASy: NiceZyme view
- KEGG: KEGG entry
- MetaCyc: metabolic pathway
- PRIAM: profile
- PDB structures: RCSB PDB PDBe PDBsum
- Gene Ontology: AmiGO / QuickGO
Search
- PMC: articles
- PubMed: articles
- NCBI: proteins

The enzyme oxalomalate lyase (EC 4.1.3.13) catalyzes the chemical reaction

3-oxalomalate $\rightleftharpoons$ oxaloacetate + glyoxylate

This enzyme belongs to the family of lyases, specifically the oxo-acid-lyases, which cleave carbon-carbon bonds. The systematic name of this enzyme class is 3-oxalomalate glyoxylate-lyase (oxaloacetate-forming). This enzyme is also called 3-oxalomalate glyoxylate-lyase. This enzyme participates in glyoxylate and dicarboxylate metabolism.
