= Rainer Gruessner =

German-born American general surgeon and transplant surgeon

Rainer W.G. Gruessner (born 1957) is a German-born American general surgeon and transplant surgeon, most noted as a surgical pioneer for his clinical and research innovations. Gruessner was the first transplant surgeon to perform all types of abdominal transplants (kidney, liver, pancreas and intestine) from living donors.

He was also the first surgeon to describe a standardized technique for intestinal (bowel) transplantation from a living donor and then performed it successfully in 1997. He was the first surgeon to perform a combined laparoscopic removal of a portion of the pancreas and a kidney that were successfully transplanted simultaneously into a diabetic patient with end-stage renal disease. In 1998, Gruessner performed the first preemptive liver transplant from a living donor in an infant with oxalosis. In 2012, he and his team performed the first fully robotic removal of the pancreas and simultaneous islet transplant in a patient with chronic pancreatitis.

Gruessner was a member of the team that performed the world's first split pancreas transplant and the world's first pancreas allotransplant after complete removal of a patient's native pancreas (both in 1988). He was involved in the development of transanal endoscopic microsurgery (TEM) techniques and conducted the first prospective study in 1989 that demonstrated the superiority of ultrasound in comparison to peritoneal lavage in the diagnosis of blunt abdominal trauma. In the 1990s, he was the first to confirm in large clinical studies the efficacy of new immunosuppressive drugs after pancreas transplantation. Gruessner's basic-science research has focused on different techniques of donor cell augmentation for tolerance induction after transplantation and on different rejection patterns in single versus combined transplants. In 2015, he and his team showed that 25 years of organ transplantation in the U.S. saved 2.2 million years of life in patients with end-stage organ failure.

== Biography and career ==
Gruessner was born in 1957 in Mainz, Germany and completed medical school at the Johannes Gutenberg University. In 1983, he was awarded “summa cum laude” for his doctoral thesis. After his residency, he completed a fellowship in transplantation immunology at the University of Minnesota. In 1991, Gruessner completed his professorial thesis (“Habilitation”, the German Ph.D. equivalent) at Philipps University of Marburg in Marburg, Germany.

In 1991, Gruessner began his academic career in the U.S. as an assistant professor of surgery at the University of Minnesota. Five years later, he was promoted to full professor with tenure. Gruessner returned to Europe for one year to become Chairman of the Department of General and Transplant Surgery at the University of Zurich in Zurich, Switzerland.

In 1999, Gruessner returned to the U.S. to assume the roles of Vice-Chair of the Department of Surgery and Vice Chief of the Division of Transplantation at the University of Minnesota. While in Minnesota, he and his team performed the state's first living donor liver transplant, first living donor intestinal transplant, first combined living donor intestinal and liver transplant, and first multivisceral transplant. His focus on living donor transplantation was boosted in 1996 when he received additional training in living donor transplantation at the University of Kyoto in Kyoto, Japan.

In 2007, Gruessner was appointed Chairman of the Department of Surgery at the University of Arizona. He also served as the department's Chief of Transplantation and Surgical Director of the Hepatopancreaticobiliary (HPB) Program at the University of Arizona. During his tenure, he transformed a struggling department into one with a national reputation specifically in transplantation and robotic as well as minimally invasive surgery. To achieve this, Gruessner recruited over 50 new faculty, developed numerous new programs and divisions, and quadrupled of the department's NIH support.

As Chairman of the Department of Surgery at the University of Arizona, Gruessner oversaw the surgical management for the victims of the 2011 Tucson shooting. The patients included former US Congresswoman Gabby Giffords, who suffered a critical gunshot wound to the head. While in Arizona, Gruessner performed the state's first living and deceased intestinal transplants, first multivisceral transplant, first pediatric living donor liver transplant and first autologous islet transplant.

In 2015, Gruessner joined the State University of New York (SUNY). At SUNY-Upstate in Syracuse, he substantially expanded its transplant program. In 2017, he was appointed the Clarence Dennis Professor and Chairman of the Department of Surgery at SUNY-Downstate in Brooklyn. There, he performed the first kidney after intestinal transplant from two different living donors and described the use of continuous real-time ultrasonography and Doppler study during islet infusion into the liver.

== Honors and scholarly achievements ==
Gruessner has edited three standard textbooks including Transplantation of the Pancreas and Living Donor Organ Transplantation. He has authored or co-authored more than 300 peer-reviewed publications and over 100 book chapters. He sits on various editorial boards of surgical and transplant journals and has served on many national committees and professional societies.

Gruessner received the Innovation Award of the University of Arizona in 2009, the Diabetes Cure Award of the American Diabetes Association (Arizona chapter) in 2012, and an honorary fellowship of the European Board of Transplantation in 2013. He also serves as the Medical Director of the International Pancreas Transplant Registry (IPTR), which collects data on all pancreas transplants performed in diabetic patients worldwide. In 2019, Angelika Gruessner, PhD., and he received the Richard C. Lillehei Award by the International Pancreas and Islet Transplantation Society in Lyon, France. This is the most eminent award in the field of pancreas transplantation and transplantation of diabetic patients.

Gruessner has mentored numerous transplant fellows, surgical residents and medical students. Throughout his career, Gruessner has been a vocal promoter and advocate of organ donation and transplantation.
