= Glyoxylate reductase =

Enzyme

Glyoxylate reductase (NAD)
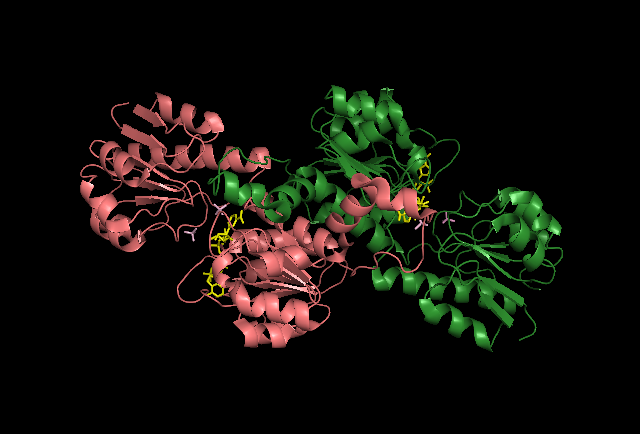
- The crystal structure of glyoxylate reductase complexed with NADPH. Each color represents a monomer of the enzyme. This enzyme was isolated from a hyperthermophilic archaeon, Pyrococcus horikoshii OT3. Image created by PyMOL.

Identifiers
- EC no.: 1.1.1.26
- CAS no.: 9028-32-4

Databases
- BRENDA: enzyme data
- ExPASy: NiceZyme view
- KEGG: enzyme entry
- MetaCyc: metabolic pathway
- Rhea: reactions
- PDB structures: RCSB PDB PDBe PDBsum
- Gene Ontology: AmiGO / QuickGO
Search
- PMC: articles
- PubMed: articles
- NCBI: proteins

Glyoxylate reductase (NADP)

Identifiers
- EC no.: 1.1.1.79
- CAS no.: 37250-17-2

Databases
- BRENDA: enzyme data
- ExPASy: NiceZyme view
- KEGG: enzyme entry
- MetaCyc: metabolic pathway
- Rhea: reactions
- PDB structures: RCSB PDB PDBe PDBsum
- Gene Ontology: AmiGO / QuickGO
Search
- PMC: articles
- PubMed: articles
- NCBI: proteins

Glyoxylate reductases, first isolated from spinach leaves, are a type of enzyme that catalyze the reduction of glyoxylate to glycolate, using the cofactor NADH (EC 1.1.1.26) or NADPH (EC 1.1.1.79). Humans have the NADPH type which is encoded by the gene GRHPR. This type of enzyme catalyzes the reaction:

glyoxylic acid
+ NAD(P)H
H^{+}
H^{+}
glycolic acid
+ NAD(P)^{+}

The systematic name of the NADH-dependent enzyme class is glycolate:NAD^{+} oxidoreductase. Other names in common use include NADH-glyoxylate reductase, glyoxylic acid reductase, and NADH-dependent glyoxylate reductase.

== Structure ==
The crystal structure of the glyoxylate reductase enzyme from the hyperthermophilic archeon Pyrococcus horiskoshii OT3 has been reported. The enzyme exists in the dimeric form. Each monomer has two domains: a substrate-binding domain where glyoxylate binds, and a nucleotide-binding domain where the NAD(P)H cofactor binds.

== Mechanism ==
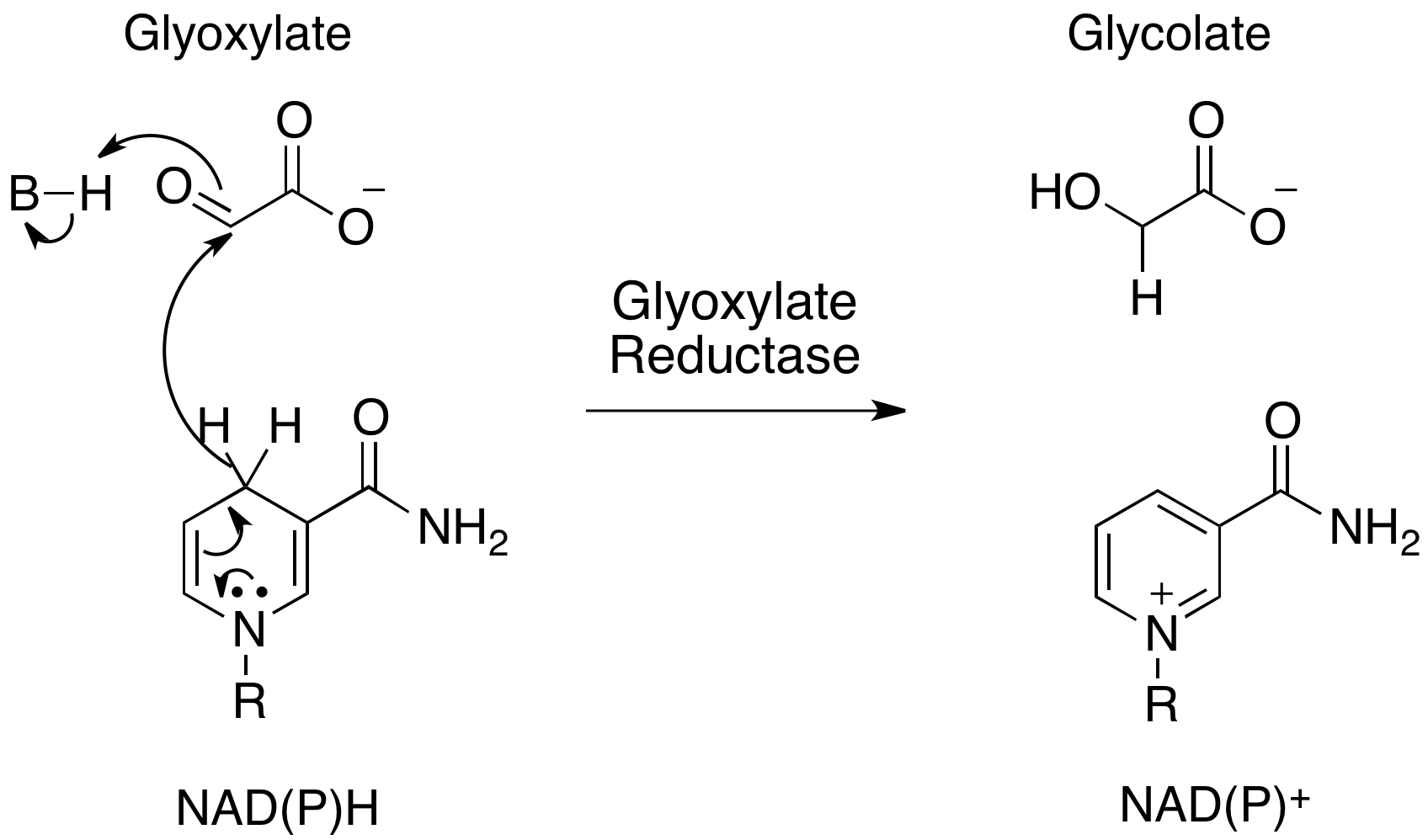
Figure 2: The mechanism for the conversion of Glyoxylate and NAD(P)H to Glycolate and NAD(P)^{+}

The enzyme catalyzes the transfer of a hydride from NAD(P)H to glyoxylate, causing a reduction of the substrate to glycolate and an oxidation of the cofactor to NAD(P)^{+}. Figure 2 shows the mechanism for this reaction.

It is thought that the two residues Glu270 and His288 are important for the enzyme's catalytic function, while the residue Arg241 is thought to be important for substrate specificity.

== Function ==
The glyoxylate reductase enzyme localizes to the cell cytoplasm in plants. It can use both NADPH and NADH as a cofactor, but prefers NADPH. The enzyme substrate, glyoxylate, is a metabolite in plant photorespiration, and is produced in the peroxisome. Glyoxylate is important in the plant cell as it can deactivate RUBISCO and inhibit its activation. Hence, glyoxylate levels are important in regulating photosynthesis.

The enzyme is thought of as a glyoxylate-glycolate shuttle that helps in the disposal of excess reducing equivalents from photosynthesis. This is supported by the following findings: (1) glycolate biosynthesis in the chloroplasts is highest at low CO_{2} concentrations, (2) the enzyme is quite specific for the NADPH cofactor which is a final product of electron transfer in the chloroplasts during photosynthesis, and (3) when isolated chloroplasts are exposed to light, they absorb glyoxylate and reduce it, but they do not absorb glycolate.

Due to the link between glyoxylate levels and photosynthesis, an increase in glyoxylate levels indicates that the plant is under stress. As glyoxylate levels continue to increase, they can harm the plant by (1) reacting with DNA, (2) oxidizing membrane lipids, (3) modifying proteins, and (4) increasing the transcription of stress-related genes in the plant. This highlights the importance of glyoxylate reductase, as it helps keep plant cells healthy and detoxifies the cell by reducing glyoxylate levels. In the absence of the enzyme, the side-effects of increased glyoxylate activity can cause cellular and developmental problems in the plant.

Glyoxylate reductase can be used as a tool for studying photorespiratory carbon metabolism in plant leaves. Such studies can be carried out using acetohydroxamate and aminooxyacetate, which have been found to inhibit glyoxylate reductase activity. These inhibitors are not fully specific, but provide fully reversible inhibition of the enzyme and so provide a flexible tool for metabolic studies in plants.

== Disease relevance ==
A human protein, GRHPR, has been identified that exhibits both glyoxylate and hydroxypyruvate reductase activities. The DNA sequence of this protein is up to 30% similar to the sequence of hydroxypyruvate and glyoxylate reductases found in a range of plant and microbial species.

GRHPR is an important protein in the human body, as it converts the metabolic byproduct glyoxylate into the less reactive glycolate. The reduced function of the enzyme causes a build-up of glyoxylate in the liver, and in turn causes an increase in oxalate levels in urine.

The reduced enzyme function can be caused by a rare inherited autosomal recessive disorder known as primary hyperoxaluria type II (PH2). This condition can cause nephrolithiasis (kidney stone), nephrocalcinosis and renal failure.

== Industrial relevance ==
Glyoxylate reductase uses NAD(P)H to reduce an oxoacid (glyoxylate) to its corresponding α-hydroxy acid (glycolate). This class of reactions provides an opportunity for the synthesis of chiral hydroxy acids. Such products are of interest in the synthesis of pharmaceuticals, such as anti-obesity compounds and semisynthetic penicillins.

== Evolution ==
Glyoxylate is an important component of the glyoxylate cycle, a variant of the citric acid cycle, whereby acetyl-CoA is converted to succinate and then other carbohydrates in plants, bacteria, protists, and fungi. Studies have been conducted to trace the genes for the glyoxylate cycle enzymes to animals. The studies have shown that these genes are in fact present in animals, but the redistribution of the genes suggest that either that (1) these genes encode other enzymes that take part in the glyoxylate cycle, but are not orthologous to the known enzymes in the cycle, or (2) animals have developed a new function for these enzymes that have yet to be characterized.
