= KHGA =

KHGA may refer to:

- KERL, a radio station (103.9 FM) licensed to serve Earle, Arkansas, United States, which held the call sign KHGA from 2019 to 2024
- 4-hydroxy-2-oxoglutarate aldolase
