= L(+)-tartrate dehydratase =

Identifiers
- EC no.: 4.2.1.32
- CAS no.: 9014-40-8

Databases
- IntEnz: IntEnz view
- BRENDA: BRENDA entry
- ExPASy: NiceZyme view
- KEGG: KEGG entry
- MetaCyc: metabolic pathway
- PRIAM: profile
- PDB structures: RCSB PDB PDBe PDBsum
- Gene Ontology: AmiGO / QuickGO
Search
- PMC: articles
- PubMed: articles
- NCBI: proteins

The enzyme L(+)-tartrate dehydratase (EC 4.2.1.32) catalyzes the chemical reaction

(R,R)-tartrate $\rightleftharpoons$ oxaloacetate + H_{2}O

This enzyme belongs to the family of lyases, specifically the hydro-lyases, which cleave carbon-oxygen bonds. The systematic name of this enzyme class is (R,R)-tartrate hydro-lyase (oxaloacetate-forming). Other names in common use include tartrate dehydratase, tartaric acid dehydrase, L-tartrate dehydratase, L-(+)-tartaric acid dehydratase, and (R,R)-tartrate hydro-lyase. This enzyme participates in glyoxylate and dicarboxylate metabolism. It has 2 cofactors: iron, and Thiol.
