= Serine 2-dehydrogenase =

Enzyme

serine 2-dehydrogenase

Identifiers
- EC no.: 1.4.1.7

Databases
- IntEnz: IntEnz view
- BRENDA: BRENDA entry
- ExPASy: NiceZyme view
- KEGG: KEGG entry
- MetaCyc: metabolic pathway
- PRIAM: profile
- PDB structures: RCSB PDB PDBe PDBsum
- Gene Ontology: AmiGO / QuickGO
Search
- PMC: articles
- PubMed: articles
- NCBI: proteins

In enzymology, serine 2-dehydrogenase (EC 1.4.1.7) is an enzyme that catalyzes the chemical reaction

serine
+ NAD^{+}
H_{2}O
H^{+}
H_{2}O
H^{+}
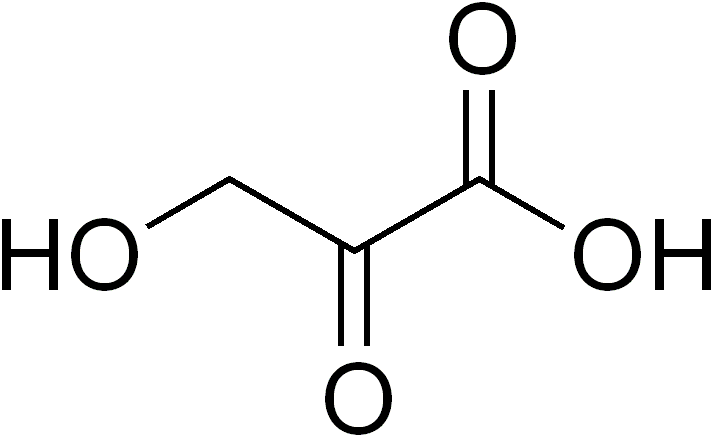
hydroxypyruvic acid
+ NADH + NH_{3}

The three substrates of this enzyme are serine, water, and oxidised nicotinamide adenine dinucleotide (NAD^{+}). Its products are hydroxypyruvic acid, reduced NADH, ammonia, and a proton.

This enzyme belongs to the family of oxidoreductases, specifically those acting on the CH-NH_{2} group of donor with NAD^{+} or NADP^{+} as acceptor. The systematic name of this enzyme class is L-serine:NAD^{+} 2-oxidoreductase (deaminating). Other names in common use include L-serine:NAD^{+} oxidoreductase (deaminating), and serine dehydrogenase.
