= Serine–pyruvate transaminase =

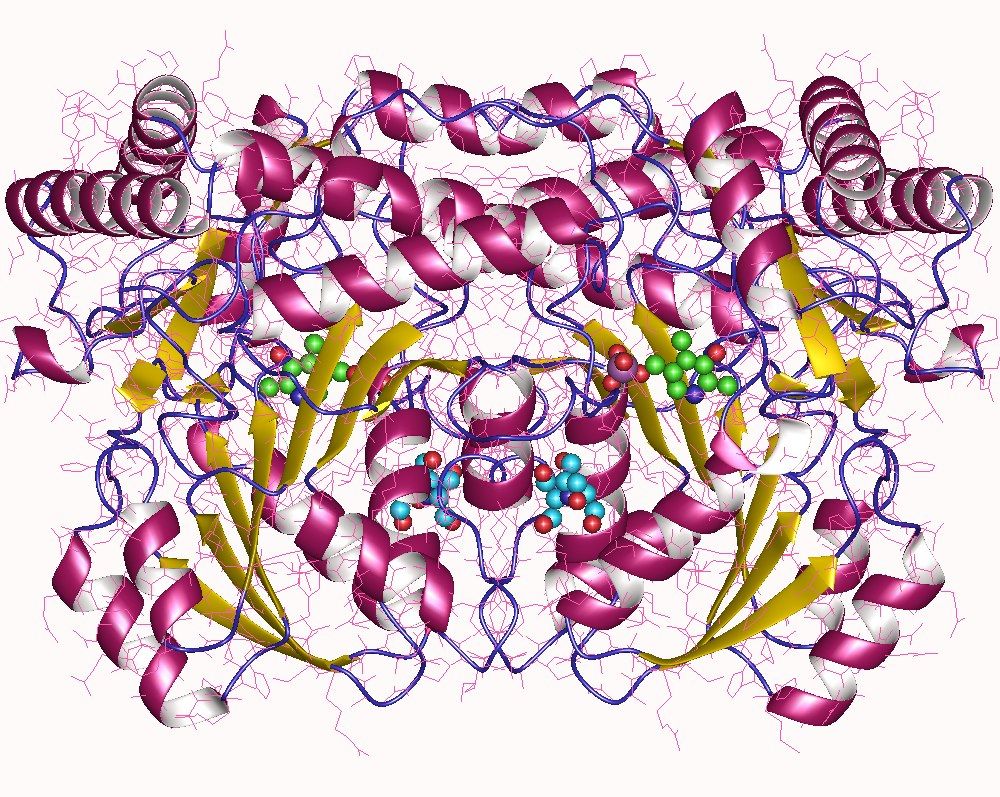
- Serine–pyruvate transaminase dimer (human)

Identifiers
- EC no.: 2.6.1.51
- CAS no.: 9030-88-0

Databases
- IntEnz: IntEnz view
- BRENDA: BRENDA entry
- ExPASy: NiceZyme view
- KEGG: KEGG entry
- MetaCyc: metabolic pathway
- PRIAM: profile
- PDB structures: RCSB PDB PDBe PDBsum
- Gene Ontology: AmiGO / QuickGO
Search
- PMC: articles
- PubMed: articles
- NCBI: proteins

Serine–pyruvate transaminase (EC 2.6.1.51) is a pyridoxal phosphate-dependent enzyme that catalyzes the chemical reaction

serine
+
pyruvic acid
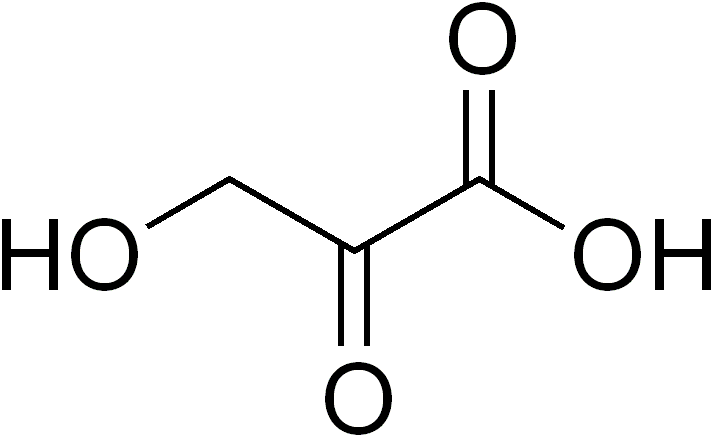
hydroxypyruvic acid
+
alanine

The two substrates of this enzyme first characterised from plants are L-serine and pyruvic acid. Its products are hydroxypyruvic acid and L-alanine.

This enzyme is a transferase, specifically a transaminase, which transfer nitrogenous groups. The systematic name of this enzyme class is L-serine:pyruvate aminotransferase. Other names in common use include SPT, and hydroxypyruvate:L-alanine transaminase. This enzyme participates in glycine, serine and threonine metabolism.

== Structural studies ==
As of late 2007, only one structure has been solved for this class of enzymes, with the PDB accession code 1J04.
