= Target-mediated drug disposition =

Process

Target-mediated drug disposition (TMDD) is the process in which a drug binds with high affinity to its pharmacological target (for example, a receptor) to such an extent that affects its pharmacokinetic characteristics. Various drug classes can exhibit TMDD, most often these are large compounds (biologics such as antibodies, cytokines or growth factors) but also smaller compounds can exhibit TMDD (such as warfarin and CHK-336). A typical TMDD pattern of antibodies displays non-linear clearance and can be seen at concentration ranges that are usually defined as 'mid-to-low'. In this concentration range, the target is partly saturated.
