= Hydroxypyruvate decarboxylase =

Class of enzymes

Identifiers
- EC no.: 4.1.1.40
- CAS no.: 37289-43-3

Databases
- BRENDA: enzyme data
- ExPASy: NiceZyme view
- KEGG: enzyme entry
- MetaCyc: metabolic pathway
- Rhea: reactions
- PDB structures: RCSB PDB PDBe PDBsum
- Gene Ontology: AmiGO / QuickGO
Search
- PMC: articles
- PubMed: articles
- NCBI: proteins

Hydroxypyruvate decarboxylase (EC 4.1.1.40) is a mammalian enzyme that catalyzes the decarboxylation of hydroxypyruvic acid to give glycolaldehyde and carbon dioxide:

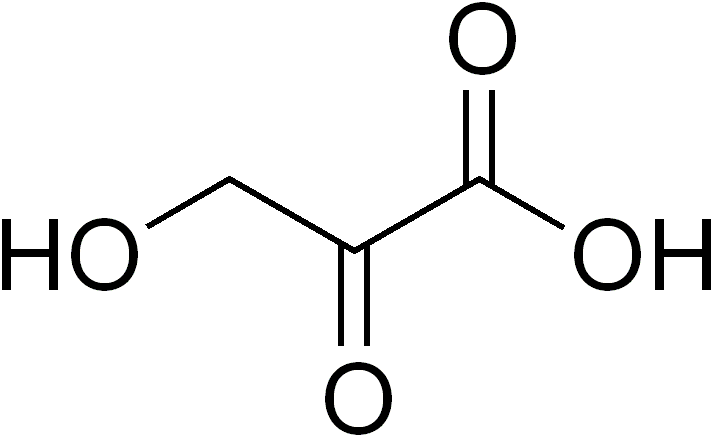
hydroxypyruvic acid
CO_{2}
glycolaldehyde

The reaction is part of a sequence that leads to production of oxalic acid, a toxic metabolite.

This enzyme is a lyase, specifically a carboxy-lyase, which cleave carbon-carbon bonds. The systematic name of this enzyme class is hydroxypyruvate carboxy-lyase (glycolaldehyde-forming). This enzyme is also called hydroxypyruvate carboxy-lyase.
