= AGXT =

Protein-coding gene in humans

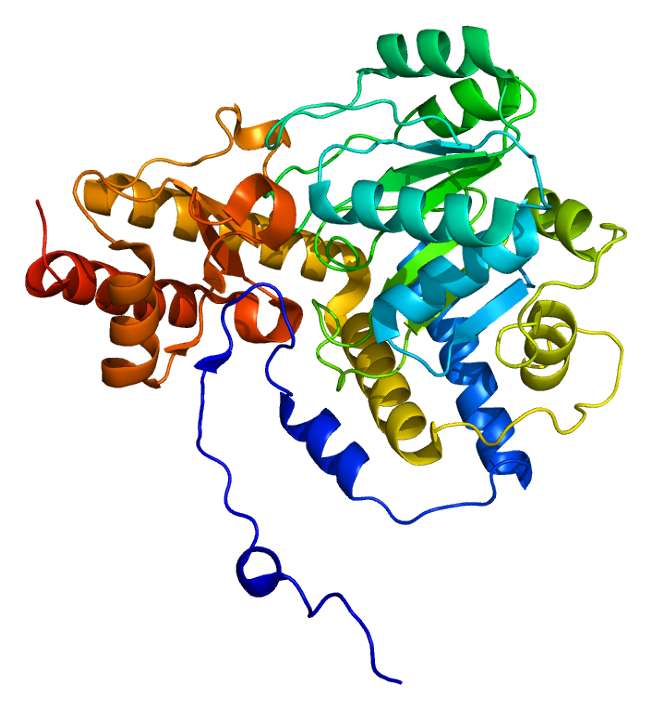

Identifiers
- Aliases: AGXT, AGT, AGT1, AGXT1, PH1, SPAT, SPT, TLH6, alanine-glyoxylate aminotransferase, alanine--glyoxylate and serine--pyruvate aminotransferase, Ser-PyrAT
- External IDs: OMIM: 604285; MGI: 1329033; GeneCards: AGXT
Available structures
PDB	Ortholog search: PDBe RCSB
PDB	List of PDB id codes 1H0C, 1J04, 2YOB, 3R9A, 4CBR, 4CBS, 4I8A, 4KXK, 4KYO
Enzyme activity
EC #	BRENDA	ExPASy	KEGG	MetaCyc
2.6.1.44	↗	↗	↗	↗
2.6.1.51	↗	↗	↗	↗

Gene location (Human)
Chr.	Chromosome 2 (human)
Band	2q37.3	Start	240,868,824 bp
Band	2q37.3	End	240,880,502 bp

Gene location (Mouse)
Chr.	Chromosome 1 (mouse)
Band	1 D|1 47.0 cM	Start	93,062,962 bp
Band	1 D|1 47.0 cM	End	93,073,143 bp
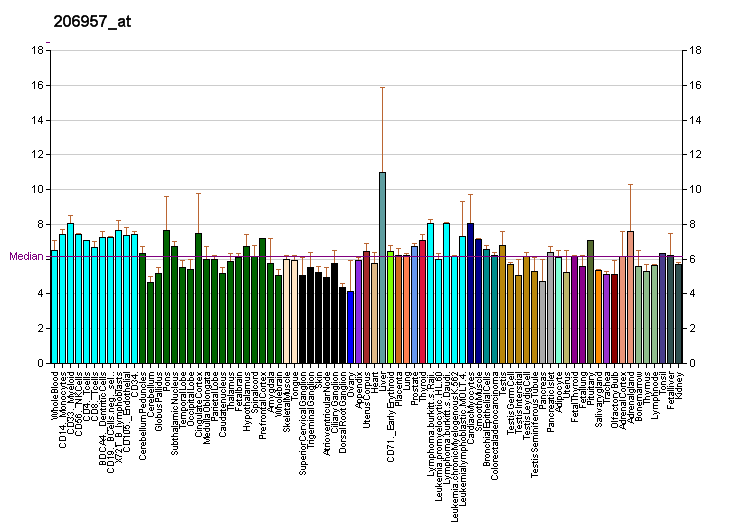

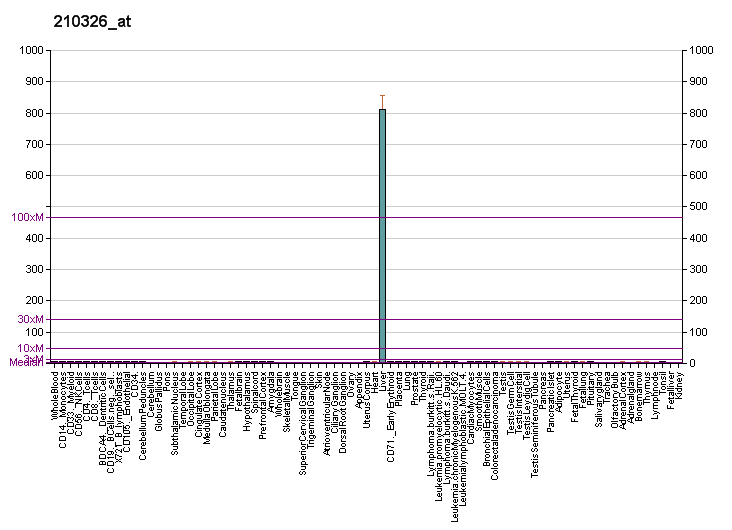

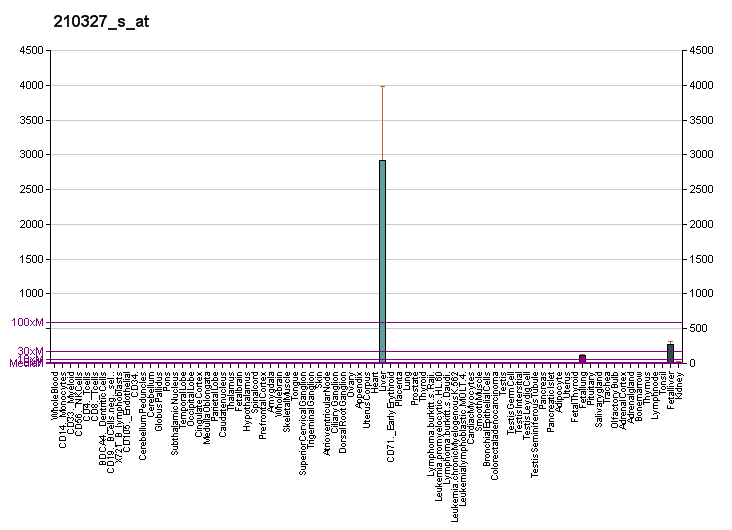
RNA expression pattern
Bgee	Human / Mouse (ortholog); Top expressed in: right lobe of liver; buccal mucosa cell; cartilage tissue; human kidney; testicle; kidney tubule; cerebellar vermis; gonad; renal medulla; renal cortex / Top expressed in: left lobe of liver; embryo; gallbladder; sexually immature organism; gastrula; duodenum; jejunum; Ileal epithelium; CA3 field; submandibular gland; More reference expression data
BioGPS	More reference expression data
Gene ontology
Molecular function	transferase activity; protein homodimerization activity; amino acid binding; alanine-glyoxylate transaminase activity; serine-pyruvate transaminase activity; transaminase activity; protein self-association; catalytic activity; protein binding; pyridoxal phosphate binding; signaling receptor binding; identical protein binding
Cellular component	peroxisome; mitochondrial matrix; peroxisomal matrix; mitochondrion; intracellular membrane-bounded organelle; cytosol
Biological process	Notch signaling pathway; oxalic acid secretion; glyoxylate catabolic process; glycine biosynthetic process, by transamination of glyoxylate; pyruvate biosynthetic process; L-alanine catabolic process; response to glucocorticoid; response to cAMP; L-cysteine catabolic process; cellular nitrogen compound metabolic process; glyoxylate metabolic process; protein targeting to peroxisome
Sources:Amigo / QuickGO
Orthologs
Databases	NCBI: entry; OMA: entry
Species	Human	Mouse
Entrez	189	11611
Ensembl	ENSG00000172482	ENSMUSG00000026272
UniProt	P21549	O35423
RefSeq (mRNA)	NM_000030	NM_001276710; NM_016702
RefSeq (protein)	NP_000021	NP_001263639; NP_057911
Location (UCSC)	Chr 2: 240.87 – 240.88 Mb	Chr 1: 93.06 – 93.07 Mb
PubMed search
- Wikidata
View/Edit Human	View/Edit Mouse

Serine—pyruvate aminotransferase is an enzyme that in humans is encoded by the AGXT gene.

This gene is expressed only in the liver and the encoded protein is localized mostly in the peroxisomes, where it is involved in glyoxylate detoxification. Mutations in this gene, some of which alter subcellular targeting, have been associated with type I primary hyperoxaluria.

== See also ==
- Peroxisomal disorder
