= Nedosiran =

Medication

Clinical data
- Trade names: Rivfloza
- Other names: DCR-PHXC
- AHFS/Drugs.com: Monograph
- License data: US DailyMed: Nedosiran
- Routes of administration: Subcutaneous
- ATC code: A16AX25 (WHO)

Legal status
- Legal status: US: ℞-only

Identifiers
- CAS Number: 2266591-83-5
- DrugBank: DB17635
- UNII: 13U9R5J3WL

Nedosiran, sold under the brand name Rivfloza, is a medication used for the treatment of primary hyperoxaluria. It is an LDHA-directed small interfering RNA developed by Dicerna Pharmaceuticals.

The most common side effects include injection site reactions.

Nedosiran was approved for medical use in the United States in September 2023. The US Food and Drug Administration (FDA) considers it to be a first-in-class medication.

== Medical uses ==
Primary hyperoxaluria type 1 is a rare disease in which urine oxalate is too high, which over time can harm the kidneys.

Nedosiran is indicated to lower urinary oxalate levels in people nine years of age and older with primary hyperoxaluria type 1 and relatively preserved kidney function.

== History ==
The US FDA approved nedosiran based on evidence from a clinical trial which included 29 participants with primary hyperoxaluria type 1. Nedosiran was evaluated in one clinical trial of 29 participants with primary hyperoxaluria type 1 who were nine years of age and older. Participants randomly received either nedosiran or placebo injections once a month for six months. Neither the participants nor the healthcare providers knew which treatment was being given. The benefit of nedosiran was assessed by measuring the amount of oxalate in the urine and comparing it to placebo. The trial was conducted at 19 sites in 11 countries in North America, Europe, Asia, and Australia.

== Society and culture ==
=== Legal status ===
The FDA granted the application for nedosiran breakthrough therapy and orphan drug designations. Nedosiran was approved for medical use in the United States in September 2023.

=== Names ===
Nedosiran is the international nonproprietary name.
