= HOGA1 =

Protein-coding gene in the species Homo sapiens

Identifiers
- Aliases: HOGA1, C10orf65, DHDPS2, DHDPSL, HP3, NPL2, 4-hydroxy-2-oxoglutarate aldolase 1
- External IDs: OMIM: 613597; MGI: 1914682; GeneCards: HOGA1
Available structures
PDB	Ortholog search: PDBe RCSB
PDB	List of PDB id codes 3S5N, 3S5O
Enzyme activity
EC #	BRENDA	ExPASy	KEGG	MetaCyc
4.1.3.16	↗	↗	↗	↗

Gene location (Human)
Chr.	Chromosome 10 (human)
Band	10q24.2	Start	97,584,323 bp
Band	10q24.2	End	97,612,802 bp

Gene location (Mouse)
Chr.	Chromosome 19 (mouse)
Band	19|19 C3	Start	42,034,049 bp
Band	19|19 C3	End	42,059,392 bp
RNA expression pattern
Bgee	Human / Mouse (ortholog); Top expressed in: right lobe of liver; renal medulla; human kidney; apex of heart; left ventricle; right adrenal cortex; body of pancreas; left adrenal gland; C1 segment; right auricle of heart / Top expressed in: right kidney; proximal tubule; liver; left lobe of liver; human kidney; yolk sac; spermatid; muscle of thigh; renal corpuscle; fetal liver hematopoietic progenitor cell; More reference expression data
BioGPS	n/a
Gene ontology
Molecular function	catalytic activity; protein homodimerization activity; lyase activity; 4-hydroxy-2-oxoglutarate aldolase activity; protein binding
Cellular component	mitochondrion; mitochondrial matrix
Biological process	metabolism; pyruvate biosynthetic process; 4-hydroxyproline catabolic process; glyoxylate catabolic process; oxalate metabolic process; glyoxylate metabolic process
Sources:Amigo / QuickGO
Orthologs
Databases	NCBI: entry; OMA: entry
Species	Human	Mouse
Entrez	112817	67432
Ensembl	ENSG00000241935	ENSMUSG00000025176
UniProt	Q86XE5	Q9DCU9
RefSeq (mRNA)	NM_138413; NM_001134670	NM_026152
RefSeq (protein)	NP_001128142; NP_612422	NP_080428
Location (UCSC)	Chr 10: 97.58 – 97.61 Mb	Chr 19: 42.03 – 42.06 Mb
PubMed search
- Wikidata
View/Edit Human	View/Edit Mouse

4-Hydroxy-2-oxoglutarate aldolase, mitochondrial (HOGA1) also known as dihydrodipicolinate synthase-like (DHDPSL) is an enzyme that in humans is encoded by the HOGA1 gene. The protein is one of the enzymes (4-hydroxy-2-oxoglutarate aldolase) involved in metabolism of hydroxyproline to glyoxylate. The enzyme overactivity can form excessive glyoxylate from hydroxyproline. Glyoxylate is catabolised to oxalate, resulting in excess excretion of oxalate in urine, predisposing to oxalate stone; a condition known as primary hyperoxaluria type III.
