= 4-hydroxy-2-oxoglutarate aldolase =

Class of enzymes

Identifiers
- EC no.: 4.1.3.16
- CAS no.: 9030-81-3

Databases
- IntEnz: IntEnz view
- BRENDA: BRENDA entry
- ExPASy: NiceZyme view
- KEGG: KEGG entry
- MetaCyc: metabolic pathway
- PRIAM: profile
- PDB structures: RCSB PDB PDBe PDBsum
- Gene Ontology: AmiGO / QuickGO
Search
- PMC: articles
- PubMed: articles
- NCBI: proteins

The enzyme 4-hydroxy-2-oxoglutarate aldolase (EC 4.1.3.16) catalyzes the chemical reaction

4-hydroxy-2-oxoglutarate $\rightleftharpoons$ pyruvate + glyoxylate

This enzyme belongs to the family of lyases, specifically the oxo-acid-lyases, which cleave carbon-carbon bonds. The systematic name of this enzyme class is 4-hydroxy-2-oxoglutarate glyoxylate-lyase (pyruvate-forming). Other names in common use include 2-oxo-4-hydroxyglutarate aldolase, hydroxyketoglutaric aldolase, 4-hydroxy-2-ketoglutaric aldolase, 2-keto-4-hydroxyglutaric aldolase, 4-hydroxy-2-ketoglutarate aldolase, 2-keto-4-hydroxyglutarate aldolase, 2-oxo-4-hydroxyglutaric aldolase, DL-4-hydroxy-2-ketoglutarate aldolase, hydroxyketoglutarate aldolase, 2-keto-4-hydroxybutyrate aldolase, and 4-hydroxy-2-oxoglutarate glyoxylate-lyase. This enzyme participates in arginine and proline metabolism and glyoxylate and dicarboxylate metabolism.

== Structural studies ==
As of late 2007, two structures have been solved for this class of enzymes, with PDB accession codes 1WAU and 2C0A.
