= GRHPR =

Protein-coding gene in the species Homo sapiens

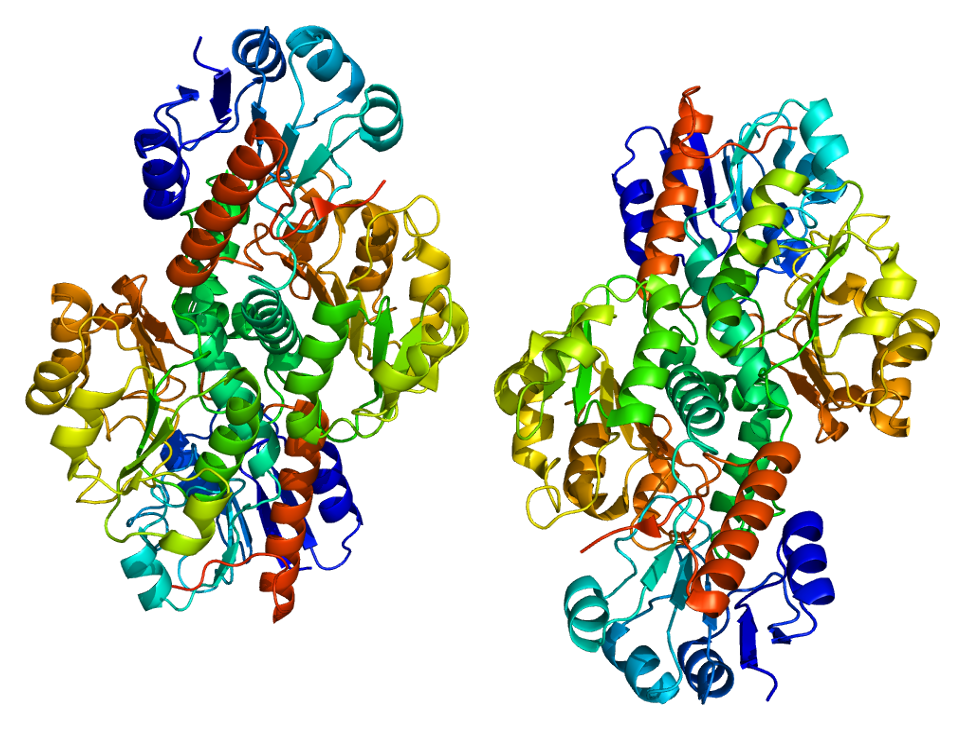
Available structures
PDB	Ortholog search: PDBe RCSB
PDB	List of PDB id codes 2GCG, 2H1S, 2Q50, 2WWR

Identifiers
- Aliases: GRHPR, GLXR, GLYD, PH2, glyoxylate reductase/hydroxypyruvate reductase, glyoxylate and hydroxypyruvate reductase
- External IDs: OMIM: 604296; MGI: 1923488; HomoloGene: 49088; GeneCards: GRHPR; OMA:GRHPR - orthologs

Gene location (Human)
Chr.	Chromosome 9 (human)
Band	9p13.2	Start	37,422,666 bp
Band	9p13.2	End	37,436,990 bp

Gene location (Mouse)
Chr.	Chromosome 4 (mouse)
Band	4|4 B1	Start	44,981,395 bp
Band	4|4 B1	End	44,990,734 bp
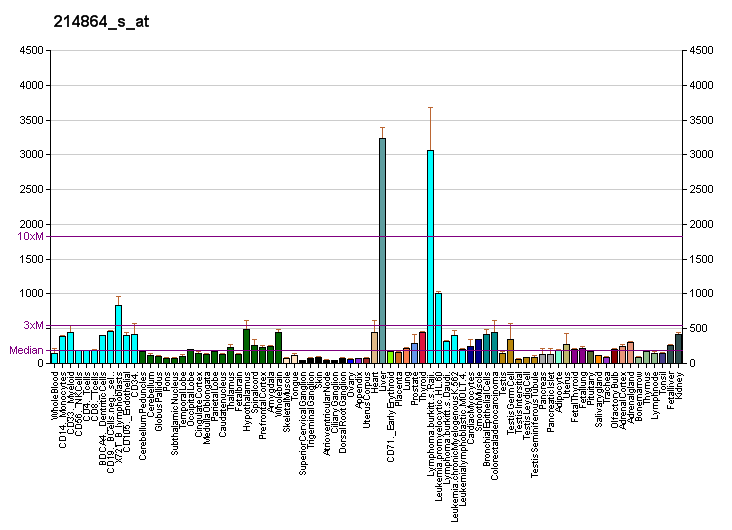

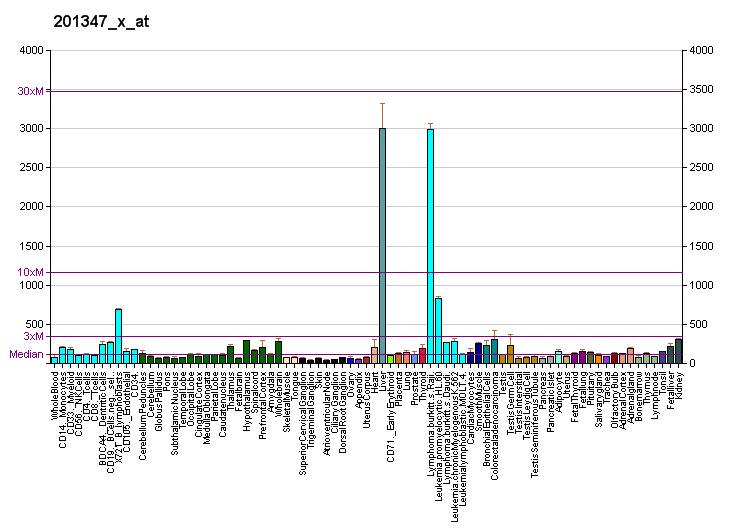

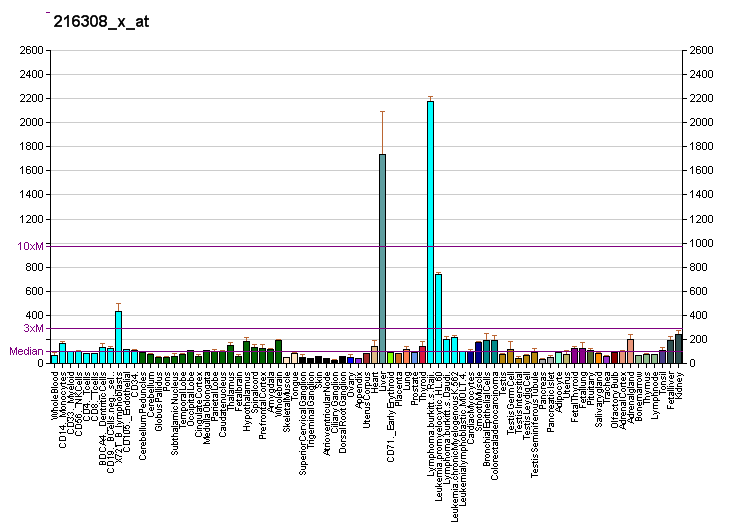
RNA expression pattern
Bgee	Human / Mouse (ortholog); Top expressed in: right lobe of liver; right adrenal gland; left adrenal gland; right adrenal cortex; left adrenal cortex; tendon of biceps brachii; human kidney; muscle of thigh; apex of heart; C1 segment / Top expressed in: left lobe of liver; right kidney; proximal tubule; Ileal epithelium; human kidney; adrenal gland; yolk sac; cumulus cell; epithelium of stomach; brown adipose tissue; More reference expression data
BioGPS	More reference expression data
Gene ontology
Molecular function	glycerate dehydrogenase activity; oxidoreductase activity, acting on the CH-OH group of donors, NAD or NADP as acceptor; protein homodimerization activity; NAD binding; carboxylic acid binding; NADP binding; NADPH binding; oxidoreductase activity; hydroxypyruvate reductase activity; glyoxylate reductase (NADP+) activity
Cellular component	cytoplasm; peroxisomal matrix; extracellular exosome; cytosol
Biological process	dicarboxylic acid metabolic process; excretion; protein complex oligomerization; metabolism; cellular nitrogen compound metabolic process; glyoxylate metabolic process
Sources:Amigo / QuickGO
Orthologs
Species	Human	Mouse
Entrez	9380	76238
Ensembl	ENSG00000137106	ENSMUSG00000035637
UniProt	Q9UBQ7	Q91Z53
RefSeq (mRNA)	NM_012203	NM_080289; NM_001312880
RefSeq (protein)	NP_036335	NP_001299809; NP_525028
Location (UCSC)	Chr 9: 37.42 – 37.44 Mb	Chr 4: 44.98 – 44.99 Mb
PubMed search
- Wikidata
View/Edit Human	View/Edit Mouse

Glyoxylate reductase/hydroxypyruvate reductase is an enzyme that in humans is encoded by the GRHPR gene.

This gene encodes an enzyme with hydroxypyruvate reductase, glyoxylate reductase, and D-glycerate dehydrogenase enzymatic activities. The enzyme has widespread tissue expression and has a role in metabolism. Type II hyperoxaluria is caused by mutations in this gene. GRHPR mutation analysis needs to pay attention to primer design, because allele dropout can cause false-positive result.
