= Hydroxypyruvate reductase =

hydroxypyruvate reductase

Identifiers
- EC no.: 1.1.1.81
- CAS no.: 9059-44-3

Databases
- IntEnz: IntEnz view
- BRENDA: BRENDA entry
- ExPASy: NiceZyme view
- KEGG: KEGG entry
- MetaCyc: metabolic pathway
- PRIAM: profile
- PDB structures: RCSB PDB PDBe PDBsum
- Gene Ontology: AmiGO / QuickGO
Search
- PMC: articles
- PubMed: articles
- NCBI: proteins

In enzymology, hydroxypyruvate reductase (EC 1.1.1.81) is an enzyme that catalyzes the chemical reaction

D-glyceric acid
+ NAD^{+}
H^{+}
H^{+}
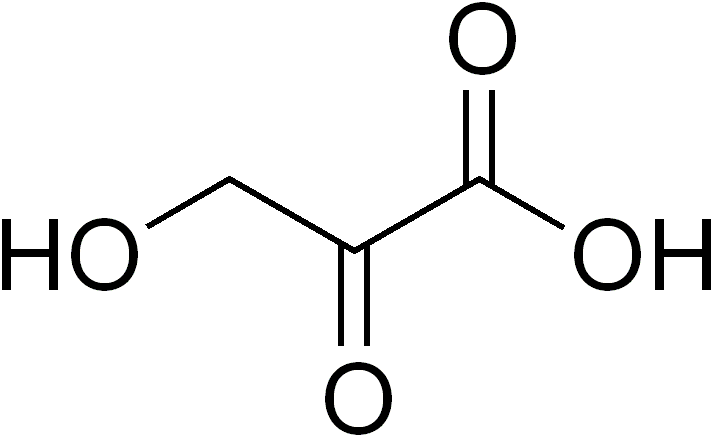
hydroxypyruvic acid
+ NADH

The two substrates of this enzyme are D-glyceric acid and oxidised nicotinamide adenine dinucleotide (NAD^{+}). Its products are hydroxypyruvic acid, reduced NADH and a proton. The enzyme can alternatively use nicotinamide adenine dinucleotide phosphate as its cofactor.

This enzyme belongs to the family of oxidoreductases, specifically those acting on the CH-OH group of donor with NAD^{+} or NADP^{+} as acceptor. The systematic name of this enzyme class is D-glycerate:NADP^{+} 2-oxidoreductase. Other names in common use include beta-hydroxypyruvate reductase, NADH:hydroxypyruvate reductase, and D-glycerate dehydrogenase. This enzyme participates in glycine, serine and threonine metabolism and glyoxylate and dicarboxylate metabolism.
