= Primary hyperoxaluria =

- Specialty: Obstetrics and gynaecology, urology, medical genetics, endocrinology

Primary hyperoxaluria is a rare condition (autosomal recessive) resulting in increased excretion of oxalate (up to 600 mg a day from normal 50 mg a day), with oxalate stones being common.

== Signs and symptoms ==
Primary hyperoxaluria is an autosomal recessive disease, meaning both copies of the gene contain the mutation. Both parents must have one copy of this mutated gene to pass it on to their child, but they do not typically show signs or symptoms of the disease.

A single kidney stone in children or recurrent stones in adults is often the first warning sign of primary hyperoxaluria. Other symptoms range from recurrent urinary tract infections, severe abdominal pain or pain in the side, blood in the urine, to chronic kidney disease and kidney failure. The age of symptom onset, progression and severity can vary greatly from one person to another, even among members of the same family. Some individuals may have mild cases that go undiagnosed well into adulthood; others may develop severe complications during infancy, which may result in early death.

== Pathophysiology ==
Oxalate

The buildup of oxalate in the body causes increased renal excretion of oxalate (hyperoxaluria), which in turn results in kidney and bladder stones. Stones cause urinary obstruction (often with severe and acute pain), secondary infection of urine and eventually kidney damage. Primary hyperoxaluria is caused by genetic defects that result in the overproduction of oxalate. This is different from secondary hyperoxaluria, which is caused by the increase in dietary and intestinal absorption of oxalate or excessive intake of oxalate precursors.

Oxalate stones in primary hyperoxaluria tend to be severe, resulting in relatively early kidney damage (in teenage years to early adulthood), which impairs the excretion of oxalate leading to a further acceleration in accumulation of oxalate in the body.

After the development of kidney failure patients may get deposits of oxalate in the bones, joints and bone marrow. Severe cases may develop haematological problems such as anaemia and thrombocytopaenia. The deposition of oxalate in the body is sometimes called "oxalosis" to be distinguished from "oxaluria" which refers to oxalate in the urine.

== Diagnosis ==
A diagnosis of primary hyperoxaluria is suspected based on presenting patient characteristics such as kidney stones in infants or children, recurrent kidney stones in adults, or family history of hyperoxaluria. In these patients, stone analysis and urine analysis are recommended to rule out secondary causes of hyperoxaluria. A definitive diagnosis of primary hyperoxaluria requires genetic testing. This is performed using a gene panel covering known mutations for all three types of primary hyperoxaluria.

=== Classification ===
The three main types of primary hyperoxaluria (PH1, PH2, and PH3) are each associated with mutations in specific genes involved in the metabolism of glyoxylate, the precursor of oxalate. These mutations result in decreased production or activity of the proteins that are involved in the normal breakdown of glyoxylate, which results in an overproduction of oxalate. Mutations in the genes AGXT and GRHPR cause PH1 and PH2, respectively, through decreased production or activity of the proteins they make, which stops the normal breakdown of glyoxylate. Similarly, mutations in the gene HOGA1 cause PH3 due to loss-of-function mutations resulting in impaired protein function.

PH1 is considered to be the most common and rapidly progressing form, accounting for about 80% of all currently diagnosed cases and PH2 and PH3 accounting for approximately 10% each of the current cases. However, recent evidence has suggested that PH2 and PH3 are not as benign as previously thought, with up to 50% of patients with PH2 developing kidney failure (chronic kidney disease [CKD] stage 5). While current estimates indicate that kidney failure is rarer in patients with PH3 compared to PH1 and PH2, CKD has been reported in patients with PH3. Moreover, the genetic prevalence based on known PH3 variants is much higher than the diagnosed prevalence of the disease, which could mean either incomplete penetrance (i.e. variant present with no clinical symptoms) or underdiagnosis (i.e. variant present with clinical symptoms but not diagnosed).

Type	OMIM	Gene
PH1	259900	AGXT
PH2	260000	GRHPR
PH3	613616	HOGA1

== Treatment ==
Increased water intake and alkalinization of urine is advised to prevent oxalate precipitation in urinary tract. In addition, Vitamin B6 (pyridoxine) is used to treat PH1 because alanine glyoxylate transaminase requires pyridoxine as cofactor. In approximately one third of patients with PH1, pyridoxine treatment decreases oxalate excretion and prevent kidney stone formation. Conversely, a restriction in oxalate intake is of limited use as the main source of oxalate is endogenous in primary hyperoxaluria.

A targeted release lanthanum carbonate has shown promising results in adult patients with primary hyperoxaluria, and could potentially serve as a cheaper and globally accessible alternative to gene therapies depending on further research (e.g. randomized controlled trials with larger cohorts).

== Gene Therapy ==
Lumasiran, an RNA interference therapeutic drug, is indicated for the treatment of primary hyperoxaluria type 1 (PH1) in adults and children of all ages and is available under the UK Early Access to Medicines Scheme (EAMS). Lumasiran was approved for medical use in the European Union and in the United States in November 2020. In addition, there are a few agents under investigation in clinical trials for PH: Nedosiran (RNA interference therapeutic) for PH1, PH2, and PH3; Stiripentol (antiepileptic drug); Oxabact (lyophilized Oxalobacter formigenes; and Reloxaliase (oxalate-digesting enzyme) for PH

Nedosiran (RIVFLOZA) was approved for medical use in the United States in September 2023. RIVFLOZA is an LDHA-directed small interfering RNA indicated to lower urinary oxalate levels in children 9 years of age and older and adults with primary hyperoxaluria type 1 (PH1) and relatively preserved kidney function. Rivfloza concentration is 160 mg/mL, and it is available in single dose prefilled syringes for patients above 50 kg and smaller dose vial for (0.5ml) or those less than 50 kg (pediatrics).The safety and effectiveness of Rivfloza have been established in pediatric patients aged 9 years and older.

YOLT-203 and ABO-101 In September 2024, Yaotang Biotechnology that developed YOLT-203 was dually recognized by the US FDA for orphan drugs and rare pediatric diseases. YOLT-203 became the world's first in vivo gene editing clinical trial for primary hyperoxaluria type 1 (PH1). In January 2025, YolTech Therapeutics announced that it is independently developed in vivo gene editing drug using CRISPR/Cas gene editing tool called YOLT-203 for treatment of primary hyperoxaluria type 1. This is done by delivering the gene editor to liver cells through lipid nanoparticles, accurately editing the HAO1 gene to inhibit the expression of glycolate oxidase, thereby reducing oxalate production from the source. The clinical trial included 7 PH1 patients treated with YOLT-203. The key efficacy endpoint is the change of urine oxalate level in 24 hours from baseline. Data showed that during the longest follow-up period of 16 weeks after treatment, the maximum reduction in patients' urine oxalate levels was 70%, and the efficacy was long-lasting and stable. Results of the clinical trials showed excellent safety and efficacy in reducing and maintaining patients' urine oxalate levels. YOLT-203 is considered the world's first in vivo gene editing drug for the treatment of PH1 to obtain positive clinical data. Gene editing technology is expected to achieve "one-time treatment, lifelong cure", breaking through the limitations of existing therapies that require long-term repeated administration. Another new potential treatment for PH1 has received special recognition from the FDA is called ABO-101. ABO-101 is developed by Arbor Biotechnologies, uses gene-editing technology to reduce oxalate production in the liver through a one-time treatment. Clinical trials are expected to begin in early 2025 to test the treatment's safety and effectiveness in both adults and children.

=== Treatment of renal failure in primary hyperoxaluria ===
Kidney failure is a serious complication requiring treatment in its own right. Dialysis can control kidney failure but tends to be inadequate to dispose of excess oxalate. Renal transplant is more effective and is the primary treatment of severe hyperoxaluria. Ultimately though, liver transplantation (often in addition to renal transplant) is required to correct the underlying metabolic defect.

== See also ==
- Peroxisomal disorder
