= Hyperoxaluria =

- Other names: Bird's disease
- Oxalate
- Specialty: Endocrinology

Hyperoxaluria is an excessive urinary excretion of oxalate. Individuals with hyperoxaluria often have calcium oxalate kidney stones. It is sometimes called Bird's disease, after Golding Bird, who first described the condition.

== Causes ==
Hyperoxaluria can be primary (as a result of a genetic defect) or secondary to another disease process.

Type I primary hyperoxaluria (PH1) is associated mutations in the gene AGXT encoding Serine Pyruvate Aminotransferase, a key enzyme involved in oxalate metabolism. PH1 is an example of a protein mistargeting disease, wherein AGXT shows a trafficking defect. Instead of being trafficked to peroxisomes, it is targeted to mitochondria, where it is metabolically deficient despite being catalytically active. Type II is associated with Glyoxylate Reductase/Hydroxypyruvate Reductase (GRHPR).

Secondary hyperoxaluria can occur as a complication of jejunoileal bypass, or in a patient who has lost much of the ileum with an intact colon. In these cases, hyperoxaluria is caused by excessive gastrointestinal oxalate absorption.

Excessive intake of oxalate-containing food, such as rhubarb, may also be a cause in rare cases.

== Diagnosis ==
=== Types ===
The types are the following:

- Primary hyperoxaluria
- Enteric hyperoxaluria
- Idiopathic hyperoxaluria
- Oxalate poisoning

== Treatment ==
The main therapeutic approach to primary hyperoxaluria is still restricted to symptomatic treatment, i.e. kidney transplantation once the disease has already reached mature or terminal stages. However, through genomics and proteomics approaches, efforts are currently being made to elucidate the kinetics of AGXT folding which has a direct bearing on its targeting to appropriate subcellular localization. A child with primary hyperoxaluria was treated with a liver and kidney transplant. A favorable outcome is more likely if a kidney transplant is complemented by a liver transplant, given the disease originates in the liver.

Secondary hyperoxaluria is much more common than primary hyperoxaluria, and should be treated by limiting dietary oxalate and providing calcium supplementation.

Lactate deydrogenase A (LDHA) inhibitors (such as CHK-336) have been evaluated in clinical trials for treatment of primary hyperoxaluria, though none have been approved as of 2025.
