= Tartronic acid semialdehyde =

Names
- Other names Tartronaldehydic acid 2-hydroxy-3-oxopropanoic acid formyl(hydroxy)acetic acid Hydroxymalonaldehydic acid

Identifiers
CAS Number	2480-77-5
3D model (JSmol)	Interactive image
ChEBI	CHEBI:16992
ChemSpider	1090
KEGG	C01146
PubChem CID	1122
- InChI: InChI=1S/C3H4O4/c4-1-2(5)3(6)7/h1-2,5H,(H,6,7) Key: QWBAFPFNGRFSFB-UHFFFAOYSA-N
- SMILES: C(=O)C(C(=O)O)O

Properties
Chemical formula	C_{3}H_{4}O_{4}
Molar mass	104.061 g·mol^{−1}
Appearance	white solid
- Except where otherwise noted, data are given for materials in their standard state (at 25 °C [77 °F], 100 kPa). Infobox references

Tartronic acid semialdehyde is the organic compound with the formula OCHCH(OH)CO_{2}H. The molecule has three functional groups, aldehyde, alcohol, and carboxylic acid. A white solid, it occurs naturally. At near neutral pH, it exists as the hydrated carboxylate (HO)_{2}CHCH(OH)CO_{2}^{−}, which is referred to as tartronate semialdehyde. Tartronate semialdehyde is produced and consumed on a prodigious scale as an intermediate in photorespiration, an undesirable side reaction that competes with photosynthesis. It is produced biologically by the condensation of two equivalents of glyoxylate:

2 OC(H)CO_{2}H → OC(H)CH(OH)CO_{2}H + CO_{2}

This condensation is catalyzed by tartronate-semialdehyde synthase.
