= Hydroxypyruvic acid =

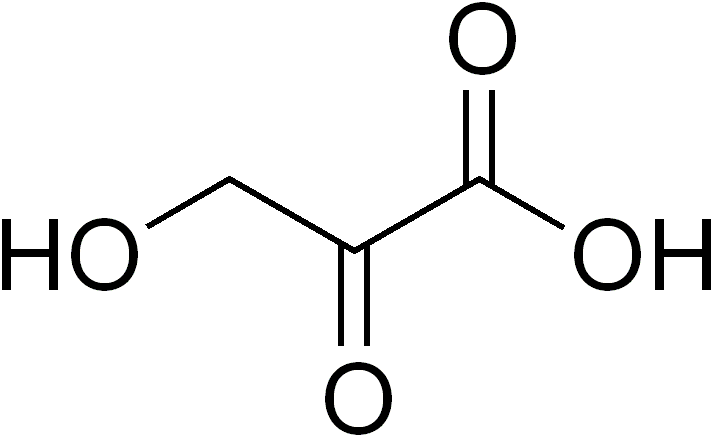
- Structural formula

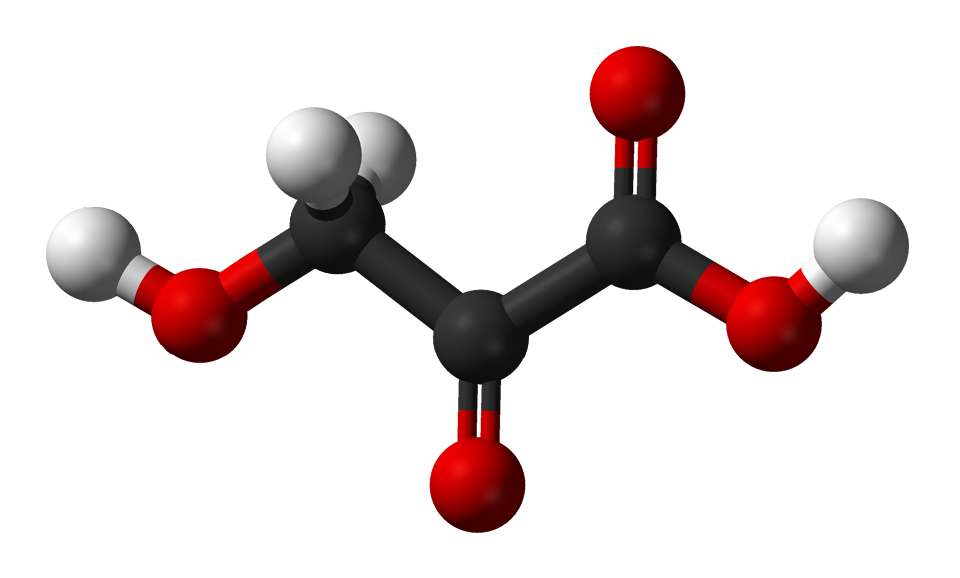
- Ball-and-stick model

Names
- Preferred IUPAC name 3-Hydroxy-2-oxopropanoic acid
- Other names Hydroxypyruvate

Identifiers
CAS Number	1113-60-6
3D model (JSmol)	Interactive image
Beilstein Reference	1721079
ChEBI	CHEBI:30841
ChEMBL	ChEMBL1230192
ChemSpider	939
DrugBank	DB02951
ECHA InfoCard	100.124.121
EC Number	619-885-5
KEGG	C00168
PubChem CID	964
UNII	934B2KHY0S
CompTox Dashboard (EPA)	DTXSID40149588
- InChI: InChI=1S/C3H4O4/c4-1-2(5)3(6)7/h4H,1H2,(H,6,7) Key: HHDDCCUIIUWNGJ-UHFFFAOYSA-N; InChI=1/C3H4O4/c4-1-2(5)3(6)7/h4H,1H2,(H,6,7) Key: HHDDCCUIIUWNGJ-UHFFFAOYAP
- SMILES: O=C(O)C(=O)CO

Properties
Chemical formula	C_{3}H_{4}O_{4}
Molar mass	104.06 g/mol
Appearance	white solid
Melting point	202 °C (396 °F; 475 K)

Hazards
- GHS labelling
Pictograms	(GHS05: Corrosive) (GHS07: Exclamation mark)
Signal word	Danger
Hazard statements	H302, H314
Precautionary statements	P260, P264, P270, P280, P301+P312, P301+P330+P331, P303+P361+P353, P304+P340, P305+P351+P338, P310, P330, P363, P405, P501
- Except where otherwise noted, data are given for materials in their standard state (at 25 °C [77 °F], 100 kPa). verify (what is ?) Infobox references

Hydroxypyruvic acid is the organic compound with the formula HOCH_{2}C(O)CO_{2}H. It is a white solid. It is encountered in many biochemical contexts, being the oxidized derivative of lactic acid, a degradation product of RuBisCO, and the result of oxidative deamination of serine.

D-Serine
+ O_{2}
D-amino acid oxidase
H_{2}O
NH_{3}
H_{2}O
NH_{3}
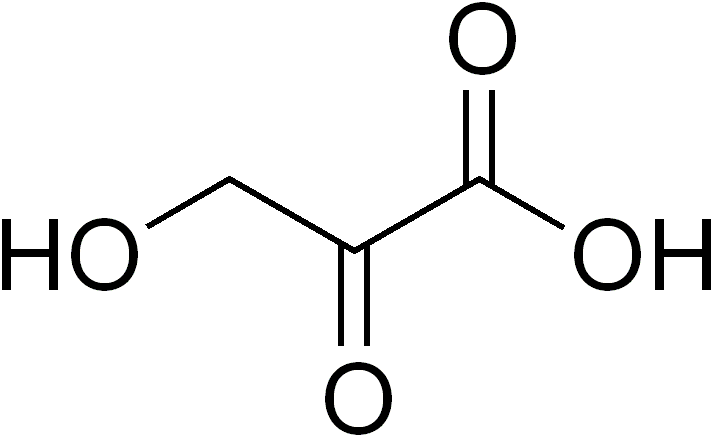
Hydroxypyruvic acid
+ HO-OH

== See also ==
- Hydroxypyruvate reductase
- Hydroxypyruvate isomerase
- Hydroxypyruvate decarboxylase
