= Glyoxylic acid =

Acetic acid bearing an aldehyde group

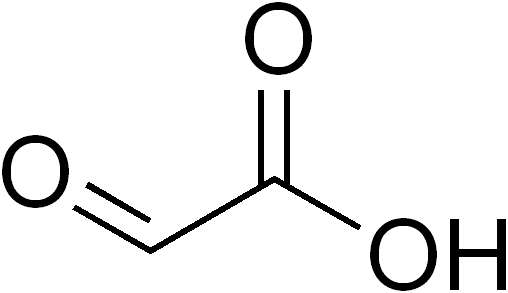

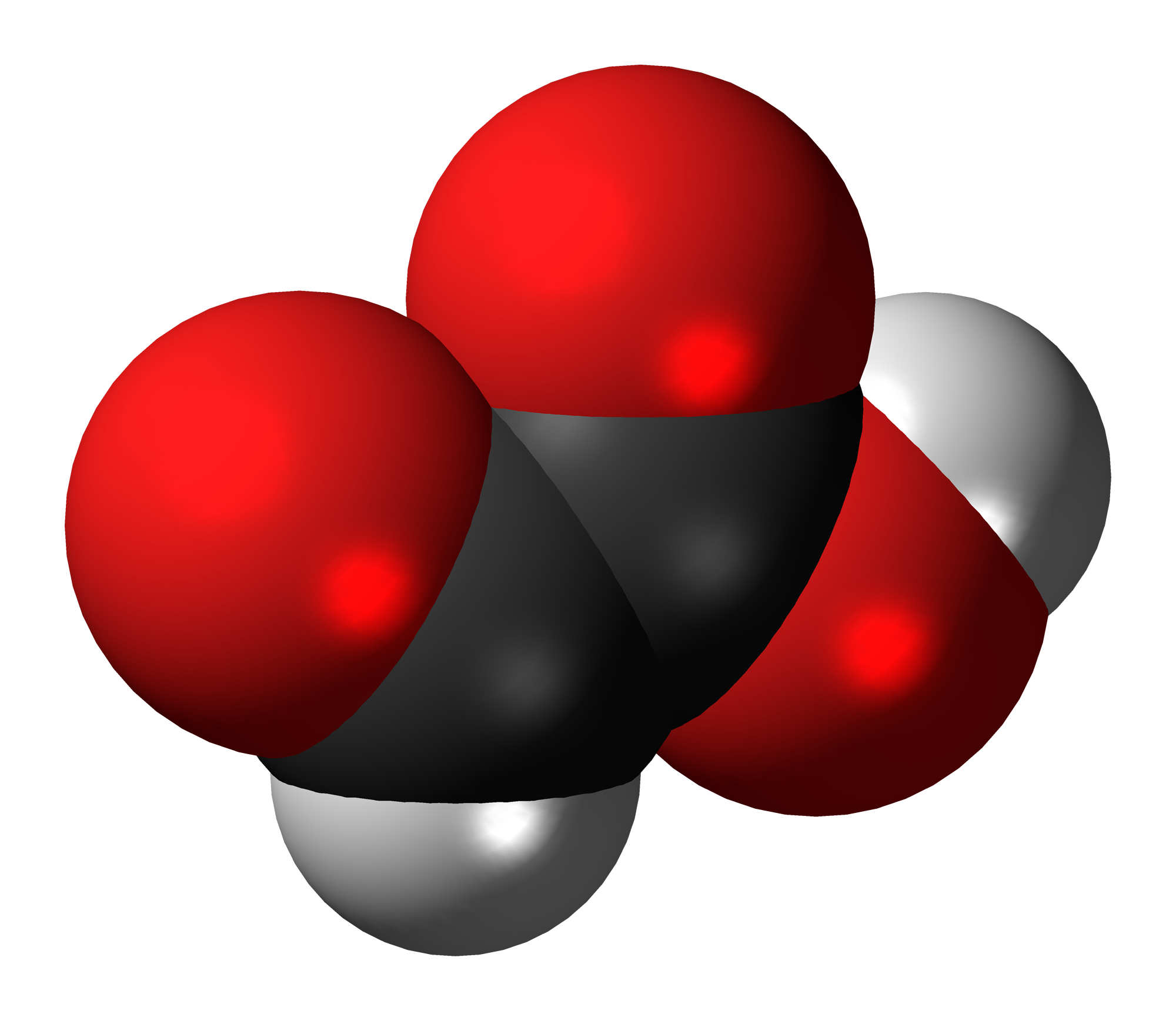

Names
- Preferred IUPAC name Oxoacetic acid
- Systematic IUPAC name Oxoethanoic acid
- Other names Glyoxylic acid 2-Oxoacetic acid Formylformic acid

Identifiers
CAS Number	298-12-4
3D model (JSmol)	Interactive image
Beilstein Reference	741891
ChEBI	CHEBI:16891
ChEMBL	ChEMBL1162545
ChemSpider	740
DrugBank	DB04343
ECHA InfoCard	100.005.508
EC Number	206-058-5
Gmelin Reference	25752
KEGG	C00048
PubChem CID	760
UNII	JQ39C92HH6
CompTox Dashboard (EPA)	DTXSID5021594
- InChI: InChI=1S/C2H2O3/c3-1-2(4)5/h1H,(H,4,5) Key: HHLFWLYXYJOTON-UHFFFAOYSA-N; InChI=1/C2H2O3/c3-1-2(4)5/h1H,(H,4,5) Key: HHLFWLYXYJOTON-UHFFFAOYAU
- SMILES: C(=O)C(=O)O

Properties
Chemical formula	C_{2}H_{2}O_{3}
Molar mass	74.035 g·mol^{−1}
Density	1.384 g/mL
Melting point	80 °C (176 °F; 353 K)
Boiling point	111 °C (232 °F; 384 K)
Acidity (pK_{a})	3.18, 3.32

Related compounds
Other anions	glyoxylate
Related carboxylic acids	formic acid acetic acid glycolic acid oxalic acid propionic acid pyruvic acid
Related compounds	acetaldehyde glyoxal glycolaldehyde
- Except where otherwise noted, data are given for materials in their standard state (at 25 °C [77 °F], 100 kPa). verify (what is ?) Infobox references

Glyoxylic acid or oxoacetic acid is an organic compound. Together with acetic acid, glycolic acid, and oxalic acid, glyoxylic acid is one of the C_{2} carboxylic acids. It is a colourless solid that occurs naturally and is useful industrially.

== Structure and nomenclature ==
The structure of glyoxylic acid is shown as having an aldehyde functional group. The aldehyde is only a minor component of the form most prevalent in some situations. Instead, glyoxylic acid often exists as a hydrate or a cyclic dimer. For example, in the presence of water, the carbonyl rapidly converts to a geminal diol (described as the "monohydrate"). The equilibrium constant (K) is 300 for the formation of dihydroxyacetic acid at room temperature: Dihydroxyacetic acid has been characterized by X-ray crystallography.

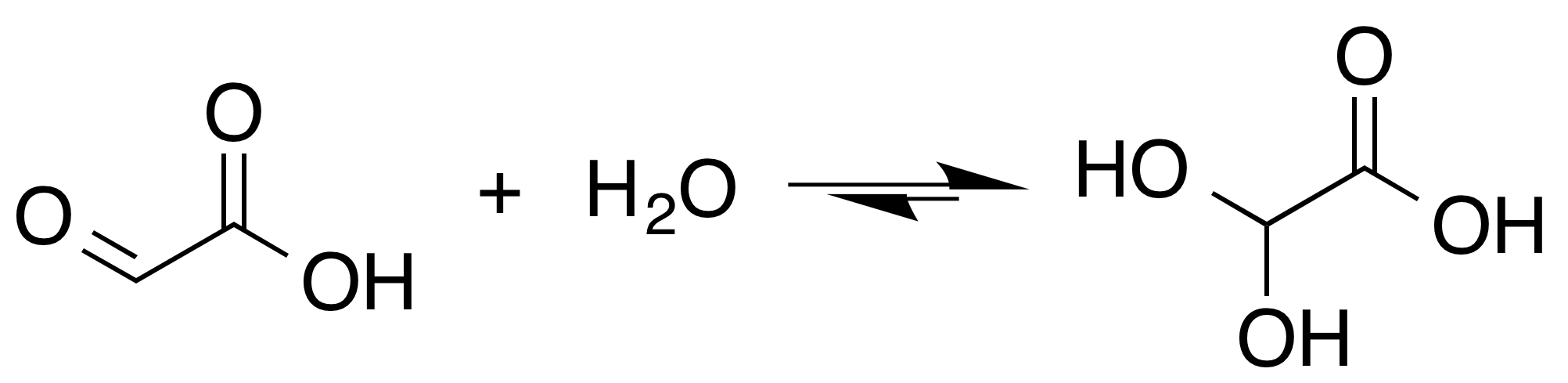

In aqueous solution, this monohydrate exists in equilibrium with a hemiacylal dimer form:

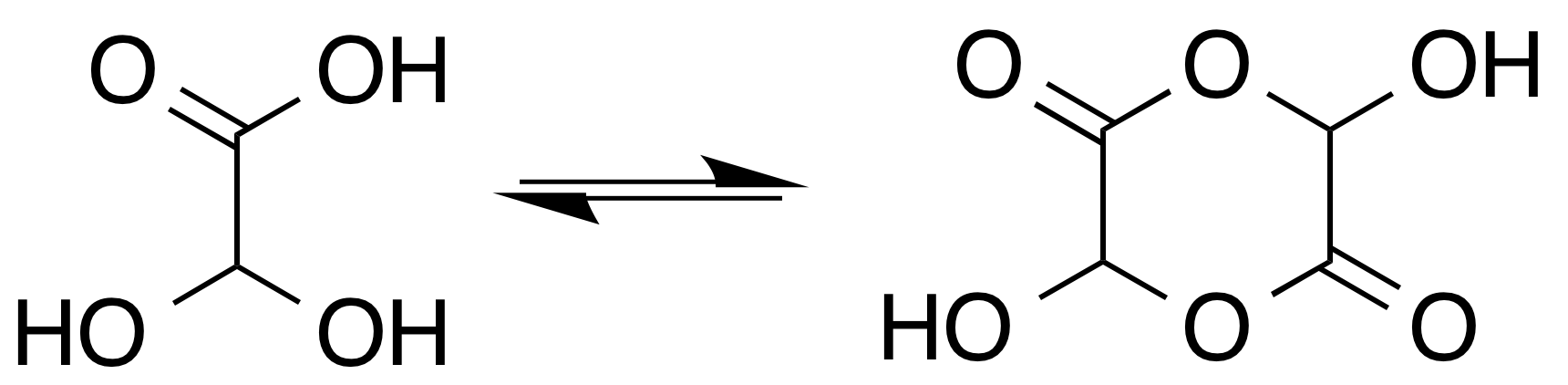

In isolation, the aldehyde structure has as a major conformer a cyclic hydrogen-bonded structure with the aldehyde carbonyl in close proximity to the carboxyl hydrogen:

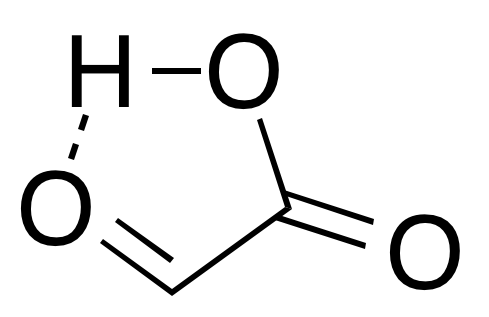

The Henry's law constant of glyoxylic acid is K_{H} = 1.09 × 10^{4} × exp[(40.0 × 10^{3}/R) × (1/T − 1/298)].

== Preparations ==
The conjugate base of glyoxylic acid is known as glyoxylate and is the form that the compound exists in solution at neutral pH. Glyoxylate is the byproduct of the amidation process in biosynthesis of several amidated peptides.

For the historical record, glyoxylic acid was prepared from oxalic acid electrosynthetically: in organic synthesis, lead cathodes were applied for preparing glyoxylic acid from oxalic acid in a sulfuric acid electrolyte.

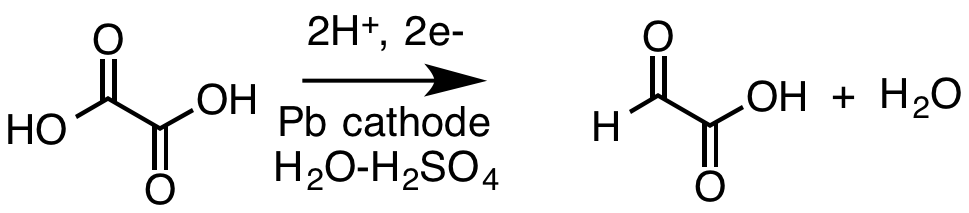

Hot nitric acid can oxidize the dialdehyde glyoxal to glyoxylic acid, however this reaction is highly exothermic and prone to thermal runaway. In addition, the diacid oxalic acid is the main side product.

Also, ozonolysis of maleic acid is effective.

== Biological role ==
Glyoxylate is an intermediate of the glyoxylate cycle, which enables organisms, such as bacteria, fungi, and plants to convert fatty acids into carbohydrates. The glyoxylate cycle is also important for induction of plant defense mechanisms in response to fungi. The glyoxylate cycle is initiated through the activity of isocitrate lyase, which converts isocitrate into glyoxylate and succinate. Research is being done to co-opt the pathway for a variety of uses such as the biosynthesis of succinate.

=== In humans ===
Glyoxylate is produced via two pathways: through the oxidation of glycolate in peroxisomes or through the catabolism of hydroxyproline in mitochondria. In the peroxisomes, glyoxylate is converted into glycine by AGT1 or into oxalate by glycolate oxidase. In the mitochondria, glyoxylate is converted into glycine by AGT2 or into glycolate by glyoxylate reductase. A small amount of glyoxylate is converted into oxalate by cytoplasmic lactate dehydrogenase.

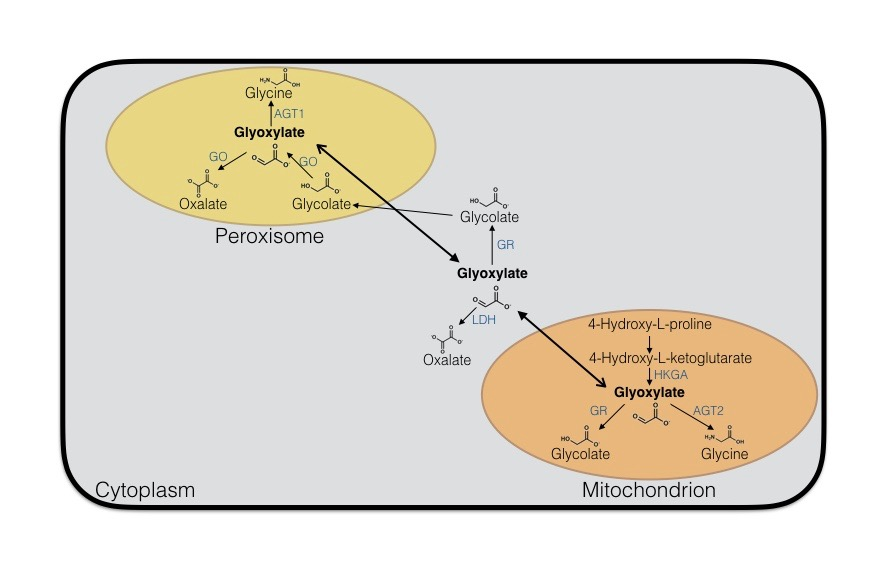
Oxalate and glyoxylate metabolism in hepatocytes. AGT1 and 2, alanine:glyoxylate aminotransferase 1 and 2; GO, glycolate oxidase; GR, glyoxylate reductase; HKGA, 4-hydroxy-2-ketoglutarate lyase; LDH, lactate dehydrogenase

=== In plants ===
In addition to being an intermediate in the glyoxylate cycle, glyoxylate is also an important intermediate in the photorespiration pathway. Photorespiration is a result of the side reaction of RuBisCO with O_{2} instead of CO_{2}. While at first considered a waste of energy and resources, photorespiration has been shown to be an important method of regenerating carbon and CO_{2}, removing toxic phosphoglycolate, and initiating defense mechanisms. In photorespiration, glyoxylate is converted from glycolate through the activity of glycolate oxidase in the peroxisome. It is then converted into glycine through parallel actions by SGAT and GGAT, which is then transported into the mitochondria. It has also been reported that the pyruvate dehydrogenase complex may play a role in glycolate and glyoxylate metabolism.

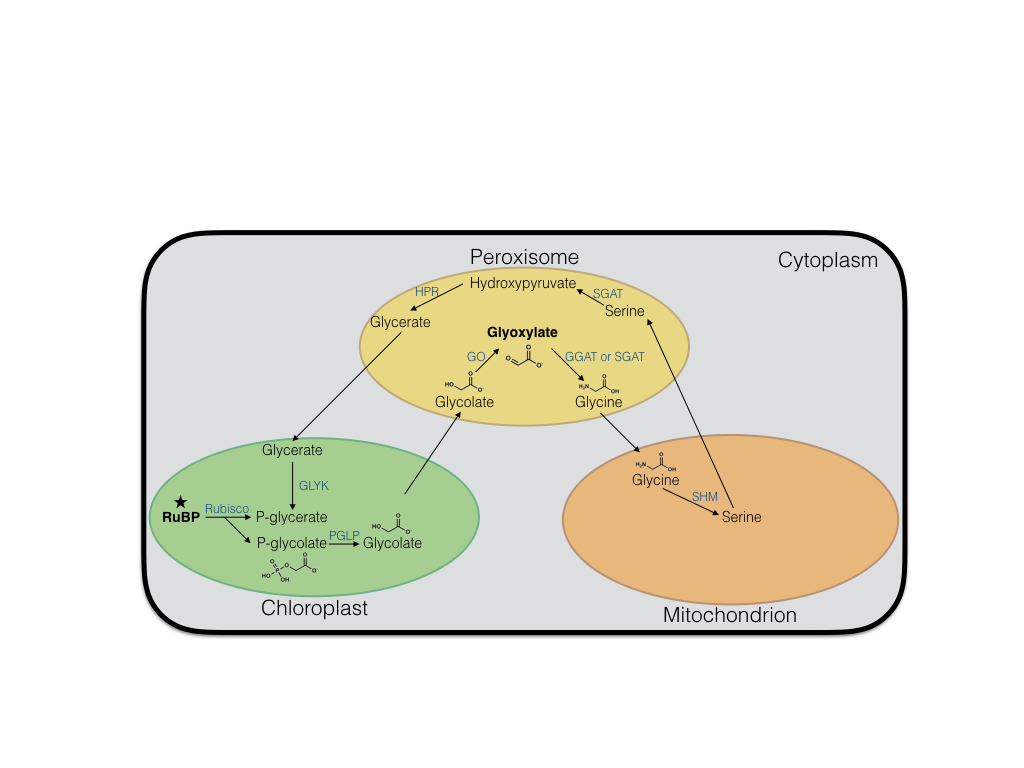
Basic overview of photorespiration in Arabidopsis. GGAT, glyoxylate:glutamate aminotransferase; GLYK, glycerate kinase; GO, glycolate oxidase; HPR, hydroxypyruvate reductase; PGLP, phosphoglycolate phosphatase; Rubisco, RuBP carboxylase/oxygenase; SGAT, serine:glyoxylate aminotransferase; SHM, serine hydroxymethyltransferase

== Disease relevance ==
=== Diabetes ===
Glyoxylate is thought to be a potential early marker for Type II diabetes. One of the key conditions of diabetes pathology is the production of advanced glycation end-products (AGEs) caused by the hyperglycemia. AGEs can lead to further complications of diabetes, such as tissue damage and cardiovascular disease. They are generally formed from reactive aldehydes, such as those present on reducing sugars and alpha-oxoaldehydes. In a study, glyoxylate levels were found to be significantly increased in patients who were later diagnosed with Type II diabetes. The elevated levels were found sometimes up to three years before the diagnosis, demonstrating the potential role for glyoxylate to be an early predictive marker.

=== Nephrolithiasis ===
Glyoxylate is involved in the development of hyperoxaluria, a key cause of nephrolithiasis (commonly known as kidney stones). Glyoxylate is both a substrate and inductor of sulfate anion transporter-1 (sat-1), a gene responsible for oxalate transportation, allowing it to increase sat-1 mRNA expression and as a result oxalate efflux from the cell. The increased oxalate release allows the buildup of calcium oxalate in the urine, and thus the eventual formation of kidney stones.

The disruption of glyoxylate metabolism provides an additional mechanism of hyperoxaluria development. Loss of function mutations in the HOGA1 gene leads to a loss of the 4-hydroxy-2-oxoglutarate aldolase, an enzyme in the hydroxyproline to glyoxylate pathway. The glyoxylate resulting from this pathway is normally stored away to prevent oxidation to oxalate in the cytosol. The disrupted pathway, however, causes a buildup of 4-hydroxy-2-oxoglutarate which can also be transported to the cytosol and converted into glyoxylate through a different aldolase. These glyoxylate molecules can be oxidized into oxalate increasing its concentration and causing hyperoxaluria.

== Reactions and uses ==
Glyoxylic acid is about ten times stronger an acid than acetic acid, with an acid dissociation constant of 4.7 × 10^{−4} (pK_{a} = 3.32):

OCHCO_{2}H ⇌ OCHCO^{−}_{2} + H^{+}

Heated glyoxylic acid disproportionates in a Cannizzaro reaction, forming hydroxyacetic acid and oxalic acid:

2 OCHCO_{2}H + H_{2}O → HOCH_{2}CO_{2}H + HO_{2}CCO_{2}H

Glyoxylic acid gives heterocycles upon condensation with urea and 1,2-diaminobenzene.

Gloxylate esters polymerize in base, forming a poly-methyleneoxy backbone with pendant ester groups.

=== Phenol derivatives ===
In general, glyoxylic acid undergoes an electrophilic aromatic substitution reaction with phenols, a versatile step in the synthesis of several other compounds.

The immediate product with phenol itself is 4-hydroxymandelic acid. This species reacts with ammonia to give hydroxyphenylglycine, a precursor to the drug amoxicillin. Reduction of the 4-hydroxymandelic acid gives 4-hydroxyphenylacetic acid, a precursor to the drug atenolol.

The sequence of reactions, in which glyoxylic acid reacts with guaiacol the phenolic component followed by oxidation and decarboxylation, provides a route to vanillin as a net formylation process.

=== Hopkins Cole reaction ===
Glyoxylic acid is a component of the Hopkins–Cole reaction, used to check for the presence of tryptophan in proteins.

=== Hair-strengthening cosmetics ===
Glyoxylic acid enters the composition of cosmetic creams used for "Brazilian" hair-straightening treatment. Glyoxylic acid is used in cosmetic products in replacement of formaldehyde to avoid skin irritation by this latter, however it can still evolve formaldehyde at elevated temperatures. Since the wider use of these products several persons developed acute kidney disease induced by the crystallisation of calcium oxalate in their kidneys. Toxicity studies on mice have further demonstrated that the transcutaneous absorption of glyoxylic acid after topical application causes the excretion of oxalate in the urine at a much higher level than glycolic acid.

=== Environmental chemistry ===
Glyoxylic acid is one of several ketone- and aldehyde-containing carboxylic acids that together are abundant in secondary organic aerosols. In the presence of water and sunlight, glyoxylic acid can undergo photochemical oxidation. Several different reaction pathways can ensue, leading to various other carboxylic acid and aldehyde products.

== Safety ==
For a long time, the compound was not considered to be highly toxic in animal models (LD_{50} of 2500 mg/kg for rats). However, recent observations of acute kidney injury following exposure to hair-straightening products indicate that it is toxic. After transcutaneous absorption, glyoxylic acid contained in hair-strengthening creams causes calcium oxalate nephropathy. In contrast to glycolic acid, glyoxylic acid can dramatically increase urine oxalate excretion.

== See also ==
- Semialdehyde
