= Glyoxylate and dicarboxylate metabolism =

Glyoxylate and dicarboxylate metabolism describes a variety of reactions involving glyoxylate or dicarboxylates. Glyoxylate is the conjugate base of glyoxylic acid, and within a buffered environment of known pH such as the cell cytoplasm these terms can be used almost interchangeably, as the gain or loss of a hydrogen ion is all that distinguishes them, and this can occur in the aqueous environment at any time. Likewise dicarboxylates are the conjugate bases of dicarboxylic acids, a general class of organic compounds containing two carboxylic acid groups, such as oxalic acid or succinic acid.

A compact graphical description of major biochemical reactions involved can be found at KEGG. This provides information on the relevant enzymes and details the relationship with several other metabolic processes: glycine, serine, and threonine metabolism which provides hydroxypyruvate and glyoxylate, purine metabolism which provides glyoxylate, pyruvate metabolism which provides (S)-malate and formate, carbon fixation which consumes 3-phospho-D-glycerate and provides D-ribulose 1,5-P2, ascorbate and aldarate metabolism which shares tartronate-semialdehyde, nitrogen metabolism which shares formate, pyruvate metabolism and the citrate cycle which share oxaloacetate, and vitamin B_{6} metabolism which consumes glycolaldehyde.

The glyoxylate cycle describes an important subset of these reactions involved in biosynthesis of carbohydrates from fatty acids or two-carbon precursors which enter the system as acetyl-coenzyme A. Its crucial enzymes are isocitrate lyase and malate synthase. However, alternate pathways have been proposed in organisms lacking isocitrate lyase.
