= Microbody =

Cell substructure in biology

A microbody (or cytosome) is a type of organelle that is found in the cells of plants, protozoa, fungi, and animals. Organelles in the microbody family include peroxisomes, glyoxysomes, glycosomes and hydrogenosomes. In vertebrates, microbodies are especially prevalent in the liver and kidney. Many membrane bound vesicles called microbodies that contain various enzymes, are present in both plant and animal cells.

== Structure ==
Microbody structure - a peroxisome

Microbodies are different type of bodies present in the cytosol, also known as cytosomes. A microbody is usually a vesicle with a spherical shape, ranging from 0.2-1.5 micrometers in diameter. Microbodies are found in the cytoplasm of a cell, but they are only visible with the use of an electron microscope. They are surrounded by a single phospholipid bilayer membrane and they contain a matrix of intracellular material including enzymes and other proteins, but they do not seem to contain any genetic material to allow them to self-replicate.

== Function ==
Microbodies contain enzymes that participate in the preparatory or intermediate stages of biochemical reactions within the cell. This facilitates the breakdown of fats, alcohols and amino acids. Generally microbodies are involved in detoxification of peroxides and in photo respiration in plants. Different types of microbodies have different functions:

=== Peroxisomes ===
A peroxisome is a type of microbody that functions to help the body break down large molecules and detoxify hazardous substances. It contains enzymes like oxidase, which can produce hydrogen peroxide as a byproduct of its enzymatic reactions. Within the peroxisome, hydrogen peroxide can then be converted to water by enzymes like catalase and peroxidase. The peroxisome was discovered and named by Christian de Duve.

Peroxisomes are derived from the smooth endoplasmic reticulum under certain experimental conditions and replicate by membrane growth and division out of pre-existing organelles. This is in line with homologies between the peroxisomal import machinery and the ERAD pathway in the endoplasmic reticulum, along with a number of metabolic enzymes that were likely recruited from the mitochondria.

Glyoxysomes and glycosomes are known to be peroxisome variants because they not only have similar structures, but are also built using similar processes, using related proteins, and contains related enzymes that carry out often recognizably related pathways. Even when radically different enzymes are involved, the signal peptides are conserved.

==== Glyoxysomes ====
Glyoxysomes are specialized peroxisomes found in plants and mold, which help to convert stored lipids into carbohydrates so they can be used for plant growth. In glyoxysomes the fatty acids are hydrolyzed to acetyl-CoA by peroxisomal β-oxidation enzymes. Besides peroxisomal functions, glyoxysomes also possess the key enzymes of the glyoxylate cycle.

==== Glycosomes ====
Glycosomes are specialized peroxisomes found in some protists such as the Kinetoplastida. They specialize in the breakdown of carbohydrates as well as other catabolic processes like purine salvage.

=== Hydrogenosome ===
Hydrogenosomes are a variant of mitochondria to produce molecular hydrogen and ATP in anaerobic conditions. Their link to the mitochondria is proven by their structural and functional similarities and their use of mitochondrion-related proteins (imported from the nucleus). Most of them are genomeless, but two examples are known to have a genome recognizably related to mitochondrial genomes.

== History ==
Microbodies were first discovered and named in 1954 by Rhodin. Two years later in 1956, Rouiller and Bernhard presented the first worldwide accepted images of microbodies in liver cells. Then in 1965, Christian de Duve and coworkers isolated microbodies from the liver of a rat. De Duve also believed that the name microbody was too general and chose the name of peroxisome because of its relationship with hydrogen peroxide. In 1967, Breidenbach and Beevers were the first to isolate microbodies from plants, which they named glyoxysomes because they were found to contain enzymes of the glyoxylate cycle.
