= Isocitrate lyase family =

Identifiers
- Symbol: ICL
- Pfam: PF00463
- InterPro: IPR000918
- PROSITE: PDOC00145
- SCOP2: 1f8m / SCOPe / SUPFAM
- CDD: cd00377
Available protein structures:
- PDB: 1f61A:9-427 1f8mC:9-427 1f8iD:9-427 1igwD:7-434 1dquA:14-535 1zlpB:104-184 1ujqB:80-161 1o5qA:80-161 1xg4A:80-161 1xg3C:80-161 1mumA:80-161 1oqfB:80-161 1mzxA:80-161 IPR000918 PF00463 (ECOD; PDBsum)
- AlphaFold: IPR000918; PF00463

Isocitrate lyase family is a family of evolutionarily related proteins.

Isocitrate lyase (EC 4.1.3.1) is an enzyme that catalyzes the conversion of isocitrate to succinate and glyoxylate. This is the first step in the glyoxylate bypass, an alternative to the tricarboxylic acid cycle in bacteria, fungi and plants. A cysteine, a histidine and a glutamate or aspartate have been found to be important for the enzyme's catalytic activity. Only one cysteine residue is conserved between the sequences of the fungal, plant and bacterial enzymes; it is located in the middle of a conserved hexapeptide.

Other enzymes also belong to this family including carboxyvinyl-carboxyphosphonate phosphorylmutase (EC 2.7.8.23) which catalyses the conversion of 1-carboxyvinyl carboxyphosphonate to 3-(hydrohydroxyphosphoryl) pyruvate carbon dioxide, and phosphoenolpyruvate mutase (EC 5.4.2.9), which is involved in the biosynthesis of phosphinothricin tripeptide antibiotics.

== Subfamilies ==
- Isocitrate lyase InterPro: IPR006254
- Methylisocitrate lyase InterPro: IPR012695
- Carboxyvinyl-carboxyphosphonate phosphorylmutase InterPro: IPR012697
