= Isocitrate lyase =

Isocitrate Lyase
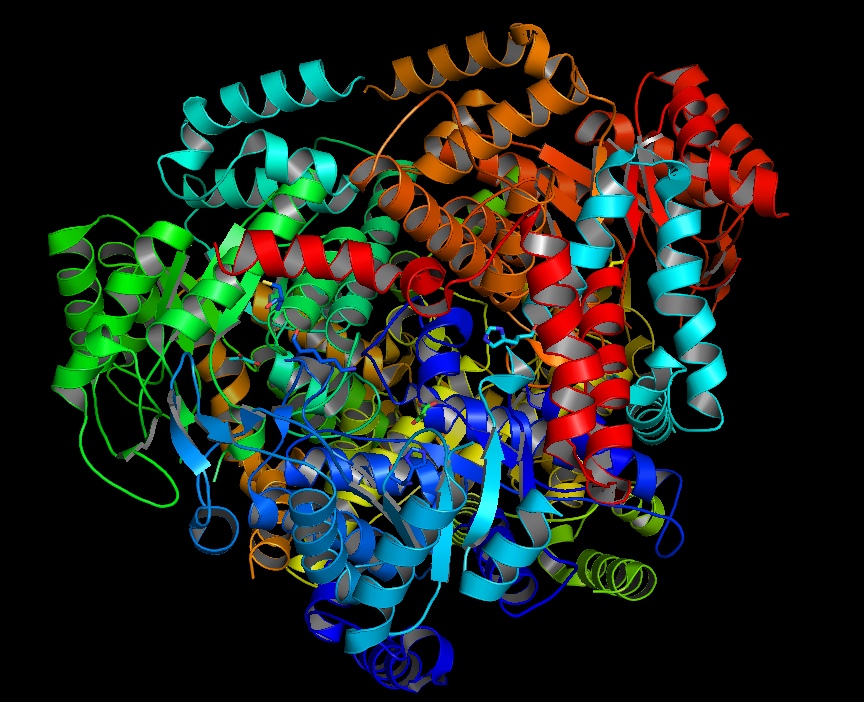
- Homotetrameric structure of Isocitrate lyase from E. coli. Based on PDB 1IGW.

Identifiers
- EC no.: 4.1.3.1
- CAS no.: 9045-78-7

Databases
- BRENDA: enzyme data
- ExPASy: NiceZyme view
- KEGG: enzyme entry
- MetaCyc: metabolic pathway
- Rhea: reactions
- PDB structures: RCSB PDB PDBe PDBsum
- Gene Ontology: AmiGO / QuickGO
Search
- PMC: articles
- PubMed: articles
- NCBI: proteins

Isocitrate lyase family

Identifiers
- Symbol: ICL
- Pfam: PF00463
- InterPro: IPR000918
- PROSITE: PDOC00145
- SCOP2: 1f8m / SCOPe / SUPFAM
Available protein structures:
- PDB: IPR000918 PF00463 (ECOD; PDBsum)
- AlphaFold: IPR000918; PF00463

Isocitrate lyase (EC 4.1.3.1), or ICL, is an enzyme in the glyoxylate cycle that catalyzes the cleavage of isocitrate to succinate and glyoxylate. Together with malate synthase, it bypasses the two decarboxylation steps of the tricarboxylic acid cycle (TCA cycle) and is used by bacteria, fungi, and plants.

The systematic name of this enzyme class is isocitrate glyoxylate-lyase (succinate-forming). Other names in common use include isocitrase, isocitritase, isocitratase, threo-Ds-isocitrate glyoxylate-lyase, and isocitrate glyoxylate-lyase. This enzyme participates in glyoxylate and dicarboxylate metabolism.

== Mechanism ==
This enzyme belongs to the family of lyases, specifically the oxo-acid-lyases, which cleave carbon-carbon bonds. Other enzymes also belong to this family including carboxyvinyl-carboxyphosphonate phosphorylmutase (EC 2.7.8.23) which catalyses the conversion of 1-carboxyvinyl carboxyphosphonate to 3-(hydrohydroxyphosphoryl) pyruvate carbon dioxide, and phosphoenolpyruvate mutase (EC 5.4.2.9), which is involved in the biosynthesis of phosphinothricin tripeptide antibiotics.

During catalysis, isocitrate is deprotonated, and an aldol cleavage results in the release of succinate and glyoxylate. This reaction mechanism functions much like that of aldolase in glycolysis, where a carbon-carbon bond is cleaved and an aldehyde is released.

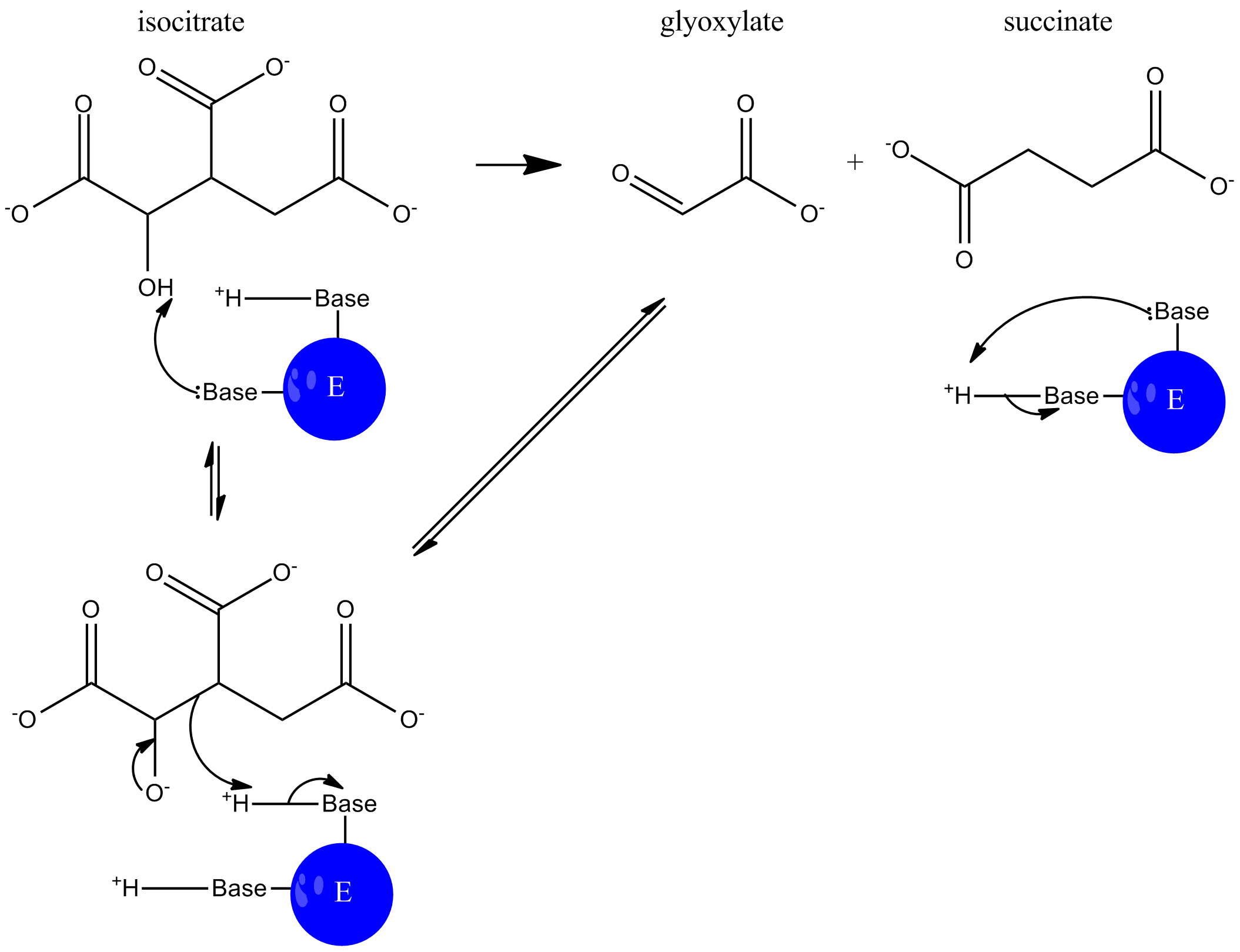

In the glyoxylate cycle, malate synthase then catalyzes the condensation of glyoxylate and acetyl-CoA to form malate so the cycle can continue.

ICL competes with isocitrate dehydrogenase, an enzyme found in the TCA cycle, for isocitrate processing. Flux through these enzymes is controlled by phosphorylation of isocitrate dehydrogenase, which has a much higher affinity for isocitrate as compared to ICL. Deactivation of isocitrate dehydrogenase by phosphorylation thus leads to increased isocitrate channeling through ICL, as seen when bacteria are grown on acetate, a two-carbon compound.

== Enzyme structure ==
As of 2023, multiple structures of ICL have been solved. These include one structure from Pseudomonas aeruginosa (PDB accession code PDB: 6G1O), one structure from Fusarium graminearum (PDB: 5E9H), one structure from fungus Aspergillus nidulans (PDB: 1DQU), one structure from Yersinia pestis (PDB: 3LG3), one structure from Burkholderia pseudomallei (PDB: 3I4E), one structure from Escherichia coli (PDB: 1IGW), two structures from Magnaporthe oryzae (PDB: 5E9F and PDB: 5E9G), four structures from Brucella melitensis (PDB: 3P0X, PDB: 3OQ8, PDB: 3EOL and PDB: 3E5B) and eleven structures from Mycobacterium tuberculosis (PDB: 1F61, PDB: 1F8I, PDB: 1F8M, PDB: 6C4A, PDB: 6C4C, PDB: 5DQL, PDB: 6EDW, PDB: 6EDZ, PDB: 6EE1, PDB: 6XPP and PDB: 8G8K).

ICL is composed of four identical chains and requires a Mg^{2+} or Mn^{2+} and a thiol for activity. In Escherichia coli, Lys-193, Lys-194, Cys-195, His-197, and His-356 are thought to be catalytic residues, while His-184 is thought to be involved in the assembly of the tetrameric enzyme.

Between prokaryotes and eukaryotes, a difference in ICL structure is the addition of approximately 100 amino acids near the center of the eukaryotic enzyme. In eukaryotes, the additional amino acids are thought to function in the localization of ICL to single-membrane-bound organelles called glyoxysomes. These additional amino acids account for the difference in molecular mass: the prokaryotic ICL is 48kDa, while the eukaryotic ICL is 67 kDa. Only one cysteine residue is conserved between the sequences of the fungal, plant and bacterial enzymes; it is located in the middle of a conserved hexapeptide.

Most ICLs that have been characterised to date contain only one domain (the catalytic domain). However, in the isoform 2 of M. tuberculosis ICL, two domains were found. Through structural and kinetic studies, the C-terminal domain was found to be a regulatory domain, which dimerises with the corresponding C-terminal domain from another subunit (of the ICL2 tetramer) upon the binding of acetyl coenzyme A to activate the catalytic activity of the enzyme.

In M. tuberculosis H37Rv (a commonly used laboratory strain), the gene that encodes ICL2 was split into two open reading frames (rv1915 and rv1916), thus encoding Rv1915 (ICL2a) and Rv1916 (ICL2b) respectively. The biological functions of Rv1915 (ICL2a) and Rv1916 (ICL2b) are poorly understood. Rv1915 and rv1916 were initially characterized as pseudogenes. An in silico study in 2019 predicted that Rv1916 (ICL2b) could be involved in the synthesis of secondary metabolites. In vitro studies showed that both Rv1915 (ICL2a) and Rv1916 (ICL2b) may be able to catalyze the conversion of isocitrate to form succinate and glyoxylate. However, a recent structural and biochemical study showed that Rv1916 (ICL2b) does not have ICL activity. Instead, the study showed that Rv1916 (ICL2b) is a acetyl-CoA-binding protein with unknown biological function.

== Assays ==
Several assays were developed to study the enzyme kinetics and inhibition of ICL. The most frequently used assays involved the use of chemical or enzyme-coupled ultraviolet–visible (UV/vis) spectroscopy to measure the amount of glyoxylate that is being formed. For example, glyoxylate can be reacted with phenylhydrazine to form hydrazone that can be analysed by UV/vis spectroscopy. Alternatively, lactate dehydrogenase can be used to catalyse the reduction of glyoxylate to glycolate in the presence of nicotinamide adenine dinucleotide (NADH), which is a cosubstrate of lactate dehydrogenase. During the reaction, NADH is being oxidised to NAD^{+}. The decrease in NADH concentration can then measured by UV/vis spectroscopy using a dye. In additional to spectroscopic techniques, biophysical techniques including native non-denaturing mass spectrometry and nuclear magnetic resonance (NMR) spectroscopy have also been applied to study ICL.

== Biological function ==
The ICL enzyme has been found to be functional in various archaea, bacteria, protists, plants, fungi, and nematodes. Although the gene has been found in genomes of nematodes and cnidaria, it has not been found in the genomes of placental mammals.

By diverting isocitrate from the TCA cycle, the actions of ICL and malate synthase in the glyoxylate cycle result in the net assimilation of carbon from 2-carbon compounds. Thus, while the TCA cycle yields no net carbon assimilation, the glyoxylate cycle generates intermediates that can be used to synthesize glucose (via gluconeogenesis), plus other biosynthetic products. As a result, organisms that use ICL and malate synthase are able to synthesize glucose and its metabolic intermediates from acetyl-CoA derived from acetate or from the degradation of ethanol, fatty acids, or poly-β-hydroxybutyrate. This function is especially important for higher plants when using seed oils. In germinating seeds, the breakdown of oils generates acetyl-CoA. This serves as a substrate for the glyoxylate cycle, which generates intermediates which serve as a primary nutrient source prior to the beginning of production of sugars by photosynthesis.

In M. tuberculosis, ICL isoforms 1 and 2 also play the role of methylisocitrate lyase, converting methylisocitrate into succinate and pyruvate. This is important because the methylcitrate cycle is key for the survival of the bacteria on odd-chain fatty acids.

== Disease relevance ==
ICL has found to be important in human, animal, and plant pathogenesis. For several agricultural crops including cereals, cucumbers, and melons, increased expression of the gene encoding ICL is important for fungal virulence. For instance, increased gene expression of icl1 has been seen in the fungus Leptosphaeria maculans upon infection of canola. Inactivation of the icl1 gene leads to reduced pathogenicity of the fungus, which is thought to be a result of the inability of the fungus to use carbon sources provided by the plant.

Additionally, upregulation of the glyoxylate cycle has been seen for pathogens that attack humans. This is the case for fungi such as Candida albicans, which inhabits the skin, mouth, GI tract, gut and vagina of mammals and can lead to systemic infections of immunocompromised patients; as well as for the bacterium Mycobacterium tuberculosis, the major causative agent of tuberculosis. In this latter case, ICL has been found to be essential for survival in the host. Thus, ICL is a current inhibition target for therapeutic treatments of tuberculosis.

Because of its use by pathogenic fungi and bacteria, specific inhibitors are being sought for ICL and malate synthase. Although some inhibitors have already been identified, including itaconate, bromopyruvate, 3-nitropropionate, oxalate, and malate. As these inhibitors are small, polar molecules, they may also inhibit other enzymes essential for host function. More research is needed to identify inhibitors that selectively target enzymes in the glyoxylate cycle.

== See also ==
- Glyoxylate cycle
- Isocitrate lyase family
