= Christian de Duve =

Belgian biochemist and cytologist (1917–2013)

Christian de Duve ForMemRS, Viscount de Duve
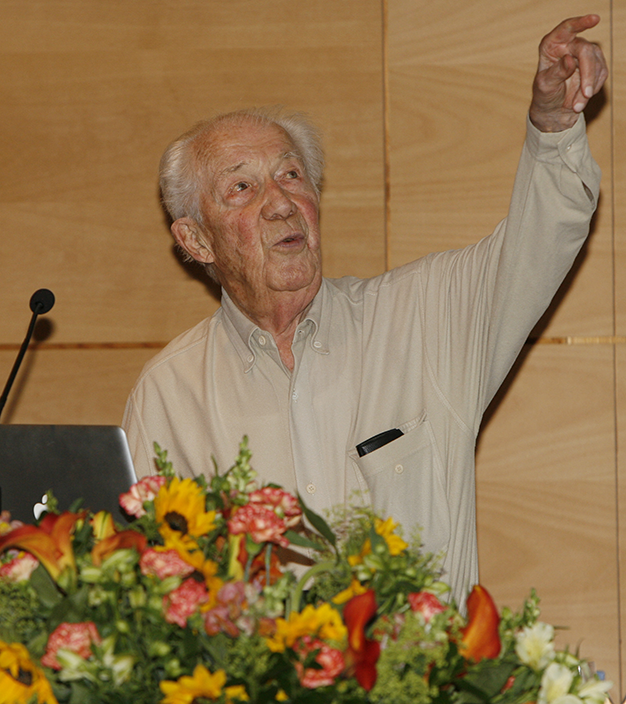
- de Duve lecturing on the origin of the eukaryotic cell in 2012
- Born: Christian René Marie Joseph de Duve; 2 October 1917; Thames Ditton, Surrey, England
- Died: 4 May 2013 (aged 95); Grez-Doiceau, Belgium
- Education: Our Lady College, Antwerp; Catholic University of Louvain
- Known for: Cell organelles
- Children: 4, including Thierry
- Awards: See list: Francqui Prize (1960); Gairdner Foundation International Award (1967); Dr H.P. Heineken Prize for Biochemistry and Biophysics (1973); Nobel Prize for Physiology or Medicine (1974); E.B. Wilson Medal (1989)
- Scientific career
- Fields: Medicine; Endocrinology; Biochemistry; Cell biology
- Workplaces: Catholic University of Louvain; UC Louvain; Rockefeller University; Washington University School of Medicine

Christian René Marie Joseph, Viscount de Duve (2 October 1917 – 4 May 2013) was a Nobel Prize-winning Belgian cytologist and biochemist. He made serendipitous discoveries of two cell organelles, peroxisomes and lysosomes, for which he shared the Nobel Prize in Physiology or Medicine in 1974 with Albert Claude and George E. Palade ("for their discoveries concerning the structural and functional organization of the cell"). In addition to peroxisome and lysosome, he invented scientific names such as autophagy, endocytosis, and exocytosis on a single occasion.

The son of Belgian refugees during the First World War, de Duve was born in Thames Ditton, Surrey, England. His family returned to Belgium in 1920. He was educated by the Jesuits at Our Lady College, Antwerp, and studied medicine at the Catholic University of Louvain. Upon earning his MD in 1941, he joined research in chemistry, working on insulin and its role in diabetes mellitus. His thesis earned him the highest university degree agrégation de l'enseignement supérieur (equivalent to PhD) in 1945.

With his work on the purification of penicillin, he obtained an MSc degree in 1946. He went for further training under later Nobel Prize winners Hugo Theorell at the Karolinska Institutet in Stockholm, and Carl and Gerti Cori at the Washington University in St. Louis. He joined the faculty of medicine at Leuven in 1947. In 1960 he was invited to the Rockfeller Institute (now Rockefeller University). With mutual arrangement with Leuven, he became professor in both universities from 1962, dividing his time between Leuven and New York. In 1974, the same year he received his Nobel Prize, he founded the ICP, which would later be renamed the de Duve Institute. He became emeritus professor of the University of Louvain in 1985, and of Rockefeller in 1988.

De Duve was granted the rank of Viscount in 1989 by King Baudouin of Belgium. He was also a recipient of Francqui Prize, Gairdner Foundation International Award, Heineken Prize, and E.B. Wilson Medal. In 1974, he founded the International Institute of Cellular and Molecular Pathology in Brussels, eventually renamed the de Duve Institute in 2005. He was the founding President of the L'Oréal-UNESCO For Women in Science Awards. He died by legal euthanasia after long suffering from cancer and atrial fibrillation.

== Early life and education ==
De Duve was born of an estate agent Alphonse de Duve and wife Madeleine Pungs in the village of Thames Ditton, near London. His parents fled Belgium at the outbreak of the First World War. After the war in 1920, at age three, he and his family returned to Belgium. He was a precocious boy, always the best student (primus perpetuus as he recalled) in school, except for one year when he was pronounced "out of competition" to give chance to other students.

He was educated by the Jesuits at Onze-Lieve-Vrouwinstituut in Antwerp, before studying at the Catholic University of Louvain in 1934. He wanted to specialize in endocrinology and joined the laboratory of the Belgian physiologist Joseph P. Bouckaert, whose primary interest was one insulin. During his last year at medical school in 1940, the Germans invaded Belgium. He was drafted to the Belgian army, and posted in southern France as medical officer. There, he was almost immediately taken as prisoner of war by Germans. His ability to speak fluent German and Flemish helped him outwit his captors. He escaped back to Belgium in an adventure he later described as "more comical than heroic".

He immediately continued his medical course, and obtained his MD in 1941 from Leuven. After graduation, de Duve continued his primary research on insulin and its role in glucose metabolism. He (with Earl Sutherland) made an initial discovery that a commercial preparation of insulin was contaminated with another pancreatic hormone, the insulin antagonist glucagon. However, laboratory supplies at Leuven were in shortage, therefore he enrolled in a programme to earn a degree in chemistry at the Cancer Institute. His research on insulin was summed up in a 400-page book titled Glucose, Insuline et Diabète (Glucose, Insulin and Diabetes) published in 1945, simultaneously in Brussels and Paris. The book was condensed into a technical dissertation which earned him the most advanced degree at the university level agrégation de l'enseignement supérieur (an equivalent of a doctorate – he called it "a sort of glorified PhD") in 1945. His thesis was followed by a number of scientific publications. He subsequently obtained a MSc in chemistry in 1946, for which he worked on the purification of penicillin.

To enhance his skill in biochemistry, he trained in the laboratory of Hugo Theorell (who later won The Nobel Prize in Physiology or Medicine in 1955) at the Nobel Medical Institute in Stockholm for 18 months during 1946–47. In 1947, he received a financial assistance as Rockefeller Foundation fellow and worked for six months with Carl and Gerti Cori at Washington University in St. Louis (the husband and wife were joint winners of The Nobel Prize in Physiology or Medicine in 1947).

== Career and research ==
In March 1947, de Duve joined the faculty of the medical school of the Catholic University of Leuven teaching physiological chemistry. In 1951 he became full professor. In 1960, Detlev Bronk, the then president of the Rockfeller Institute (what is now Rockefeller University) of New York City, met him at Brussels and offered him professorship and a laboratory. The rector of Leuven, afraid of entirely losing de Duve, made a compromise over dinner that de Duve would still be under part-time appointment with a relief from teaching and conducting examinations. The rector and Bronk made an agreement which would initially last for five years. The official implementation was in 1962, and de Duve simultaneously headed the research laboratories at Leuven and at Rockefeller University, dividing his time between New York and Leuven.

In 1969, the Catholic University of Leuven was contentiously split into two separate universities along linguistic lines. De Duve chose to join the French-speaking side, Université catholique de Louvain. He took emeritus status at the University of Louvain in 1985 and at Rockefeller in 1988, though he continued to conduct research. Among other subjects, he studied the distribution of enzymes in rat liver cells using rate-zonal centrifugation. His work on cell fractionation provided an insight into the function of cell structures. He specialized in subcellular biochemistry and cell biology and discovered new cell organelles.

=== Rediscovery of glucagon ===
The hormone glucagon was discovered by C.P. Kimball and John R. Murlin in 1923 as a hyperglycaemic (blood-sugar elevating) substance among the pancreatic extracts. The biological importance of glucagon was not known and the name itself was essentially forgotten. It was a still a mystery at the time de Duve joined Bouckaert at Leuven University to work on insulin. Since 1921, insulin was the first commercial hormonal drug originally produced by the Eli Lilly and Company, but their extraction methods introduced an impurity that caused mild hyperglycaemia, the very opposite of what was expected or desired. In May 1944 de Duve realised that crystallisation could remove the impurity. He demonstrated that Lilly's insulin process was contaminated, showing that, when injected into rats, the Lilly insulin caused initial hyperglycaemia and the Danish Novo insulin did not. Following his research published in 1947, Lilly upgraded its methods to eliminate the impurity. By then de Duve had joined Carl Cori and Gerty Cori at Washington University in St. Louis, where he worked with a fellow researcher Earl Wilbur Sutherland, Jr., who later won the Nobel Prize in Physiology or Medicine in 1971.

Sutherland had been working on the puzzle of the insulin-impurity substance, which he had named hyperglycemic-glycogenolytic (HG) factor. He and de Duve soon discovered that the HG factor was synthesised not only by the pancreas but also by the gastric mucosa and certain other parts of the digestive tract. Further, they found that the hormone was produced from pancreatic islets by cells differing from the insulin-producing beta cells; presumably these were alpha cells. It was de Duve who realised that Sutherland's HG factor was in fact the same as glucagon; this rediscovery led to its permanent name, which de Duve reintroduced it in 1951. The pair's work showed that glucagon was the major hormone influencing the breakdown of glycogen in the liver—the process known as glycogenolysis—by which more sugars are produced and released into the blood.

De Duve's original hypothesis that glucagon was produced by pancreatic alpha cells was proven correct when he demonstrated that selectively cobalt-damaged alpha cells stopped producing glucagon in guinea pigs; he finally isolated the purified hormone in 1953, including those from birds.

De Duve was first to hypothesise that the production of insulin (which decreased blood sugar levels), stimulated the uptake of glucose in the liver; he also proposed that a mechanism was in-place to balance the productions of insulin and glucagon in order to maintain normal blood sugar level, (see homeostasis). This idea was much disputed at the time, but his rediscovery of glucagon confirmed his theses. In 1953 he experimentally demonstrated that glucagon did influence the production (and thus the uptake) of glucose.

=== Discovery of lysosome ===
Christian de Duve and his team continued studying the insulin mechanism-of-action in liver cells, focusing on the enzyme glucose 6-phosphatase, the key enzyme in sugar metabolism (glycolysis) and the target of insulin. They found that G6P was the principal enzyme in regulating blood sugar levels, but, they could not, even after repeated experiments, purify and isolate the enzyme from the cellular extracts. So they tried the more laborious procedure of cell fractionation to detect the enzyme activity.

This was the moment of serendipitous discovery. To estimate the exact enzyme activity, the team adopted a procedure using a standardised enzyme acid phosphatase; but they were finding the activity was unexpectedly low—quite low, i.e., some 10% of the expected value. Then one day they measured the enzyme activity of some purified cell fractions that had been stored for five days. To their surprise the enzyme activity was increased back to that of the fresh sample; and similar results were replicated every time the procedure was repeated. This led to the hypothesis that some sort of barrier restricted rapid access of the enzyme to its substrate, so that the enzymes were able to diffuse only after a period of time. They described the barrier as membrane-like—a "saclike structure surrounded by a membrane and containing acid phosphatase."

An unrelated enzyme (of the cell fractionation procedure) had come from membranous fractions that were known to be cell organelles. In 1955, de Duve named them "lysosomes" to reflect their digestive properties. That same year, Alex B. Novikoff from the University of Vermont visited de Duve's laboratory, and, using electron microscopy, successfully produced the first visual evidence of the lysosome organelle. Using a staining method for acid phosphatase, de Duve and Novikoff further confirmed the location of the hydrolytic enzymes (acid hydrolases) of lysosomes.

=== Discovery of peroxisome ===
Serendipity followed de Duve for another major discovery. After the confirmation of lysosome, de Duve's team was troubled by the presence (in the rat liver cell fraction) of the enzyme urate oxidase. De Duve thought it was not a lysosome because it is not an acid hydrolase, typical of lysosomal enzymes; still, it had similar distribution as the enzyme acid phosphatase. Further, in 1960 he found other enzymes (such as catalase and D-amino acid oxidase), that were similarly distributed in the cell fraction—and it was then thought that these were mitochondrial enzymes. (W. Bernhard and C. Rouillier had described such extra-mitochondrial organelles as microbodies, and believed that they were precursors to mitochondria.) de Duve noted the three enzymes exhibited similar chemical properties and were similar to those of other peroxide-producing oxidases.

De Duve was skeptical of referring to the new-found enzymes as microbodies because, as he noted, "too little is known of their enzyme complement and of their role in the physiology of the liver cells to substantiate a proposal at the present time". He suggested that these enzymes belonged to the same cell organelle, but one different from previously known organelles. But, as strong evidences were still lacking, he did not publish his hypothesis. In 1955 his team demonstrated similar cell fractions with same biochemical properties from the ciliated protozoan Tetrahymena pyriformis; thus, it was indicated that the particles were undescribed cell organelles unrelated to mitochondria. He presented his discovery at a meeting of the American Society for Cell Biology in 1955, and formally published in 1966, creating the name peroxisomes for the organelles as they are involved in peroxidase reactions. In 1968 he achieved the first large-scale preparation of peroxisomes, confirming that l-α hydroxyacid oxidase, d-amino acid oxidase, and catalase were all the unique enzymes of peroxisomes.

De Duve and his team went on to show that peroxisomes play important metabolic roles, including the β-oxidation of very long-chain fatty acids by a pathway different from that in mitochondria; and that they are members of a large family of evolutionarily related organelles present in diverse cells including plants and protozoa, where they carry out distinct functions. (And have been given specific names, such as glyoxysomes and glycosomes.)

=== Origin of cells ===
De Duve's work has contributed to the emerging consensus towards accepting the endosymbiotic theory; which idea proposes that organelles in eukaryotic cells originated as certain prokaryotic cells that came to live inside eukaryotic cells as endosymbionts. According to de Duve's version, eukaryotic cells with their structures and properties, including their ability to capture food by endocytosis and digest it intracellularly, developed first. Later, prokaryotic cells were incorporated to form more organelles.

De Duve proposed that peroxisomes, which allowed cells to withstand the growing amounts of free molecular oxygen in the early-Earth atmosphere, may have been the first endosymbionts. Because peroxisomes have no DNA of their own, this proposal has much less evidence than similar claims for mitochondria and chloroplasts. His later years were mostly devoted to origin of life studies, which he admitted was still a speculative field (see thioester).

=== Publications ===
De Duve was a prolific writer, both in technical and popular works. The most notable works are:

- A Guided Tour of the Living Cell (1984) ISBN 0-7167-5002-3
- La cellule vivante, une visite guidée, Pour la Science (1987) ISBN 978-2-902918-52-2
- Construire une cellule, Dunod (1990) ISBN 978-2-7296-0181-2
- Blueprint for a Cell: the Nature and Origin of Life (1991) ISBN 0-89278-410-5
- Poussière de vie, Fayard (1995) ISBN 978-2-213-59560-3
- Vital Dust: Life as a Cosmic Imperative (1996) ISBN 0-465-09045-1
- Life Evolving: Molecules, Mind, and Meaning (2002) ISBN 0-19-515605-6
- À l'écoute du vivant, éditions Odile Jacob, Paris (2002) ISBN 2-7381-1166-1
- Singularities: Landmarks on the Pathways of Life (2005) ISBN 978-0-521-84195-5
- Singularités: Jalons sur les chemins de la vie, éditions Odile Jacob (2005) ISBN 978-2-7381-1621-5
- Science et quête de sens, Presses de la Renaissance, (2005) ISBN 978-2-7509-0125-7
- Génétique du péché originel. Le poids du passé sur l'avenir de la vie, éditions Odile Jacob (2009) ISBN 978-2-7381-2218-6
- Genetics of Original Sin: The Impact of Natural Selection on the Future of Humanity, Yale University Press (2010) ISBN 978-0-300-16507-4
- De Jesus a Jesus... en passant par Darwin, éditions Odile Jacob (2011) ISBN 978-2-7381-2681-8
- Sept vies en une: Mémoires d'un prix Nobel, Éditions Odile Jacob (2013) ISBN 978-2-7381-2843-0
- Sur la science et au-delà: [entretien] avec Jean Vandenhaute, Éditions Odile Jacob (2013) ISBN 978-2-7381-3052-5

== Personal life ==
=== Religious beliefs ===
De Duve was brought up as a Roman Catholic. In his later years he tended towards agnosticism, if not strict atheism. However, de Duve believed that "Most biologists, today, tend to see life and mind as cosmic imperatives, written into the very fabric of the universe, rather than as extraordinarily improbable products of chance." "It would be an exaggeration to say I'm not afraid of death", he explicitly said to a Belgian newspaper Le Soir just a month before his death, "but I'm not afraid of what comes after, because I'm not a believer."

He strongly supported biological evolution as a fact, and dismissive of creation science and intelligent design, as explicitly stated in one of his last books, Genetics of Original Sin: The Impact of Natural Selection on the Future of Humanity (French original 2009). He was among the seventy-eight Nobel laureates in science to endorse the effort to repeal the Louisiana Science Education Act of 2008.

=== Family ===
His family (von Duve) came from Hanover and settled in Belgium after the Battle of Waterloo.
De Duve married Janine Herman on 30 September 1943. Together they had had two sons, one of whom is noted art professor Thierry de Duve, and two daughters.

Janine died in 2008, aged 86.

=== Death ===
De Duve died on 4 May 2013, at his home in Nethen, Belgium, aged 95. He decided to end his life by legal euthanasia, performed by two doctors and in the presence of his four children. He had been long suffering from cancer and atrial fibrillation, and his health problems were exacerbated by a recent fall in his home.

De Duve was cremated as he had willed, and his ashes were distributed among family members and friends.

== Awards and honours ==
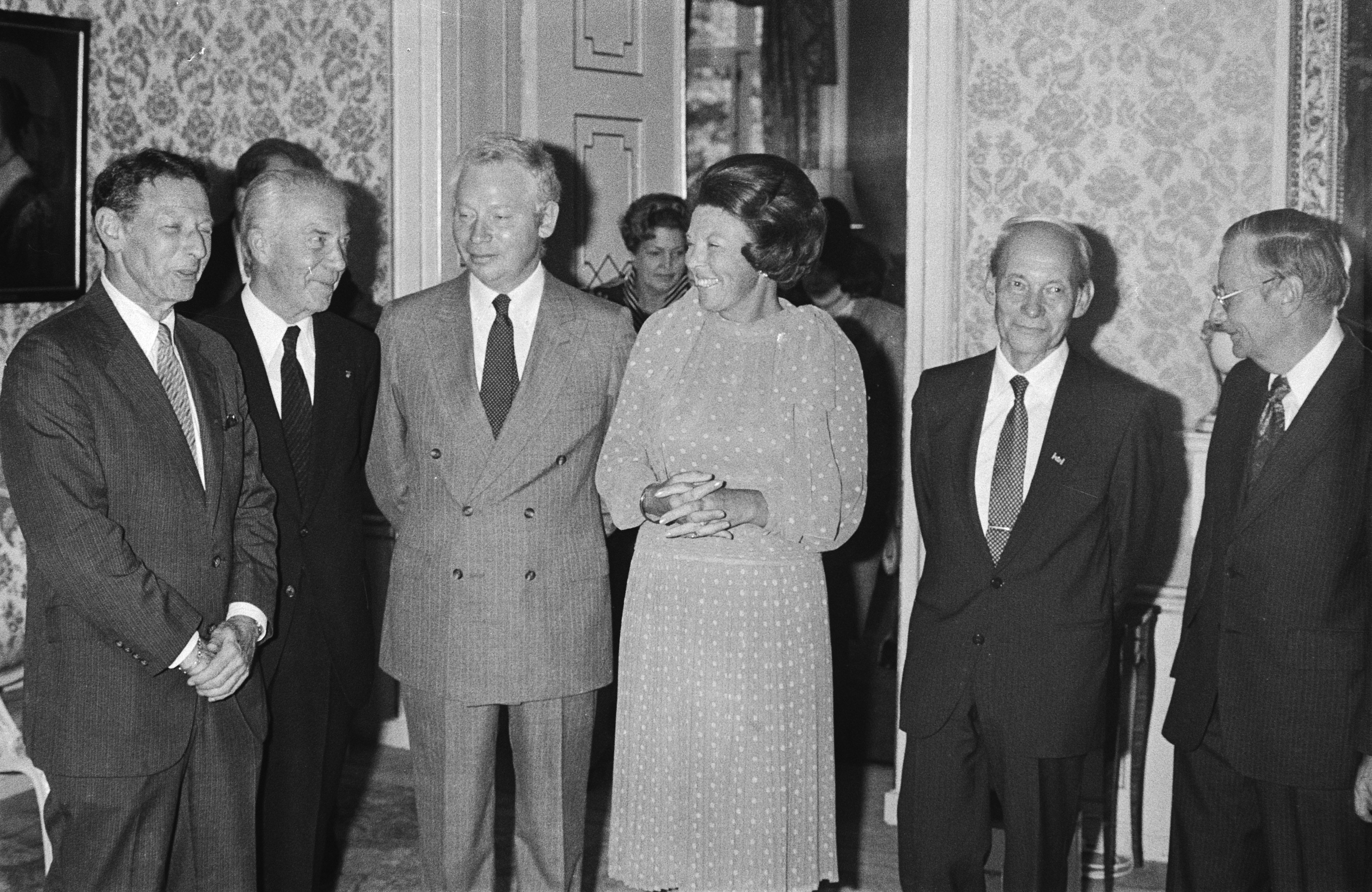
Dutch Queen Beatrix meets 5 Nobel Prize winners: Paul Berg, Christian de Duve, Steven Weinberg, Manfred Eigen, Nicolaas Bloembergen (1983)

De Duve won the Francqui Prize for Biological and Medical Sciences in 1960, and the Nobel Prize for Physiology or Medicine in 1974. King Baudouin of Belgium honoured him to Viscount in 1989. He was the recipient of the Gairdner Foundation International Award in 1967, and the Dr H.P. Heineken Prize for Biochemistry and Biophysics in 1973 from the Royal Netherlands Academy of Arts and Sciences.

He was elected a foreign associate of the National Academy of Sciences (United States) in 1975. He won the Harden Medal of the Biochemical Society of Great Britain in 1978; the Theobald Smith Award from the Albany Medical College in 1981; the Jimenez Diaz Award in 1985; the Innovators of Biochemistry Award from Medical College of Virginia in 1986; and the E.B. Wilson Medal in 1989.

He was also a member of the Royal Academies of Medicine and the Royal Academy of Sciences, Arts, and of Literature of Belgium; the Pontifical Academy of Sciences of the Vatican; the American Academy of Arts and Sciences; the French National Academy of Medicine; the Academy of Sciences of Paris; the Deutsche Akademie der Naturforscher Leopoldina; the American Philosophical Society. He was elected a Foreign Member of the Royal Society (ForMemRS) in 1988. In addition, he received honorary doctorates from eighteen universities around the world.

=== Legacy ===
De Duve founded a multidisciplinary biomedical research institute at Université catholique de Louvain in 1974, originally named the International Institute of Cellular and Molecular Pathology (ICP). He remained its president until 1991. On his 80th birthday in 1997 it was renamed the Christian de Duve Institute of Cellular Pathology. In 2005 its name was further contracted to simply the de Duve Institute.

De Duve was one of the founding members of the Belgian Society of Biochemistry and Molecular Biology, established on 15 September 1951.

De Duve is remembered as an inventor of important scientific terminology. He coined the word lysosome in 1955, peroxisome in 1966, and autophagy, endocytosis, and exocytosis in one instance at the Ciba Foundation Symposium on Lysosomes held in London during 12–14 February 1963, while he, "was in a word-coining mood."

De Duve's life, including his work resulting in a Nobel Prize, and his passion for biology is the subject of a documentary film Portrait of a Nobel Prize: Christian de Duve (Portrait de Nobel : Christian de Duve), directed by Aurélie Wijnants. It was first aired on Eurochannel in 2012.
