= Methylcitrate cycle =

Metabolic pathway

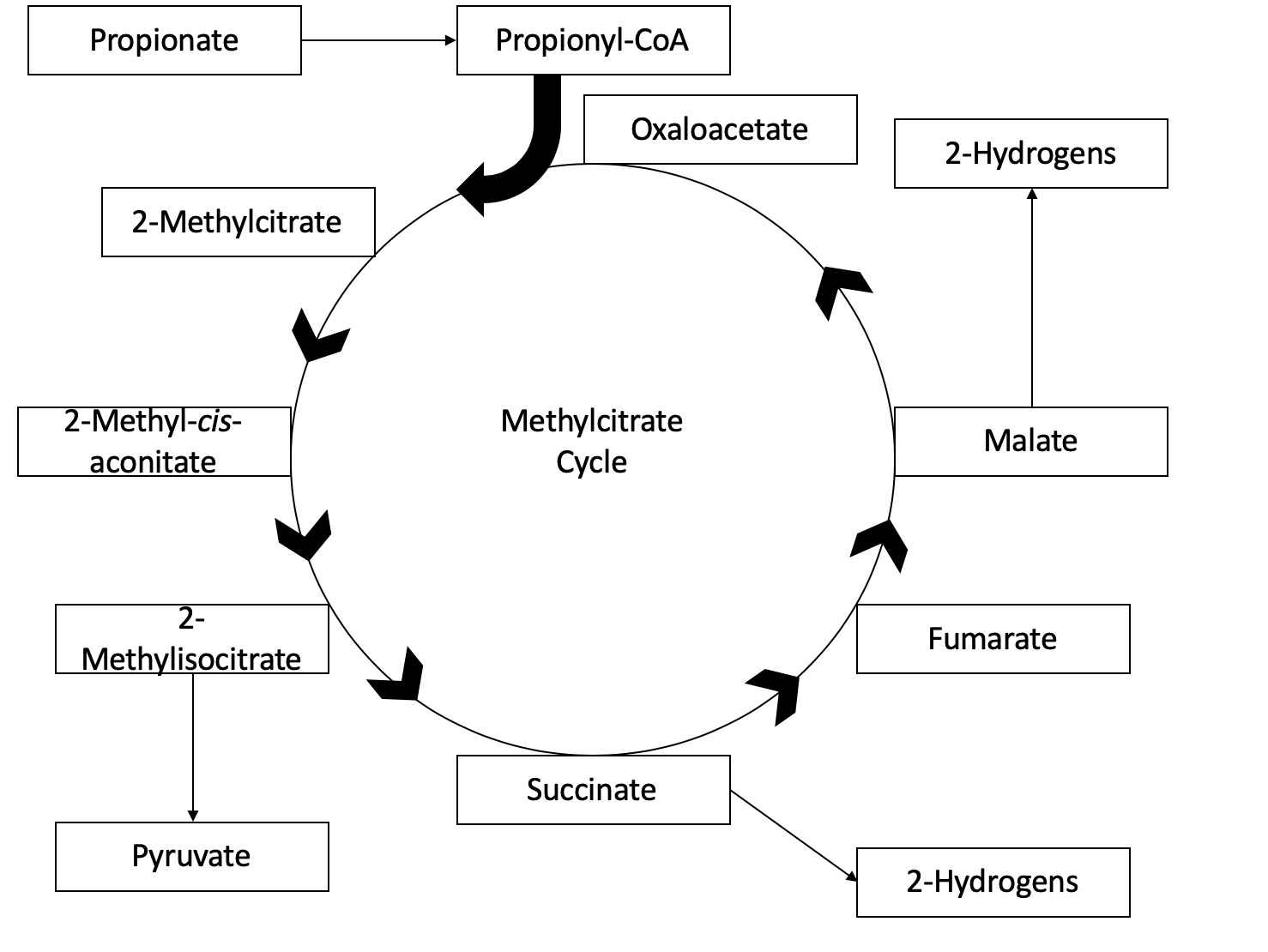
Overview of the methylcitrate cycle

The methylcitrate cycle, or the MCC, is the mechanism by which propionyl-CoA is formed, generated by β-oxidation of odd-chain fatty acids, and broken down to its final products, succinate and pyruvate. The methylcitrate cycle is closely related to both the citric acid cycle and the glyoxylate cycle, in that they share substrates, enzymes and products. The methylcitrate cycle functions overall to detoxify bacteria of toxic propionyl-CoA, and plays an essential role in propionate metabolism in bacteria. Incomplete propionyl-CoA metabolism may lead to the buildup of toxic metabolites in bacteria, and thus the function of the methylcitrate cycle is an important biological process.

== History ==
2-methylisocitric acid, an intermediate of the methylcitrate cycle, was first synthesized in 1886 as a mixture of four isomers. The pathway of the methylcitrate cycle was not discovered until 1973 in fungi, though it was not yet fully understood. Originally, the methylcitrate cycle was thought to be present only in fungal species, such as Candida lipolytica and Aspergillus nidulans. In 1999, it was discovered that the methylcitrate cycle was also present in bacteria Salmonella enterica and Escherichia coli. Much research has been done on the methylcitrate cycle's role in the development and function of various fungi and strains of bacteria, as well as its virulent properties in conjunction with the glyoxylate cycle.

== Steps ==
There are three basic steps in the methylcitrate cycle, as outlined below. Additionally, the mechanism is shown with its reactants, products, intermediates, and enzymes.

Methylcitrate cycle mechanism: Propionyl-CoA synthase is denoted here in this diagram as PrpE; Methylcitrate synthase as PrpC; Methylcitrate dehydratase/hydratase as PrpD; Methylcitrate dehydratase as AcnD; Methylaconitate cis-trans isomerase as PrpF; Aconitase as AcnB; and methylisocitrate lyase as PrpB.

Step	Substrates	Products	Enzymes	Reaction type	Comment
1	Propionate and oxaloacetate	2-methylcitrate	Propionyl-CoA synthase and methylcitrate synthase	Aldol condensation	Propinate is first activated to propionyl-CoA by propionyl-CoA synthase, then propionyl-CoA is condensed with oxaloacetate by methylcitrate synthase to form the product, 2-methylcitrate.
2	2-methylcitrate	2-methylisocitrate	Methylcitrate dehydratase, methylaconitate cis-trans isomerase and aconitase	Isomerization	2-methylcitrate is dehydrated to methylaconitate either by methylcitrate dehydratase, or by both methylcitrate dehydratase and methylaconitate cis-trans isomerase. It is then rehydrated by aconitase to form the product, 2-methylisocitrate.
3	2-methylisocitrate	Succinate and pyruvate	methylisocitrate lyase	Cleavage	2-methylisocitrate is cleaved by cycle-specific enzyme methylisocitrate lyase to form the final products, succinate and pyruvate. This cleavage completes the α-oxidation of the initial substrate, propionate, to its final product, pyruvate.

The major enzymes involved in this process are methylcitrate synthase (MCS) in step one, methylcitrate dehydratase (MCD) in step two, and 2-methylisocitrate lyase (MCL) in step three. The PrpC gene, which encodes for enzyme methylcitrate synthase in the first step of the methylcitrate cycle, is the gene responsible for propionate metabolism in the process. Without this gene, the methylcitrate cycle and ultimate metabolism would not occur, but rather catabolism. The reaction of the methylcitrate cycle both overlaps and intertwines with the citric acid cycle and the glyoxylate cycle. Odd-chain fatty acids acetate and propionate are broken down by the β-oxidation cycle to form acetyl-CoA, which is further oxidized by the citric acid cycle, and propionyl-CoA, which is oxidized by the methylcitrate cycle. The substrate oxaloacetate is generated by the citric acid and glyoxylate cycles, and the product succinate is taken from the methylcitrate cycle to be used in the citric acid cycle.

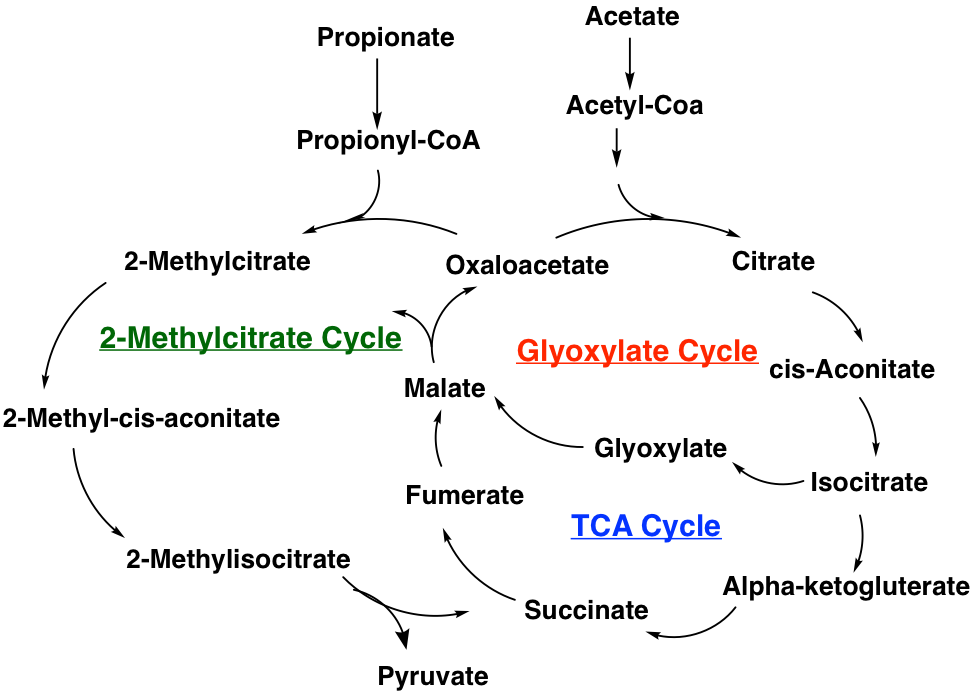
The interaction of the processes and steps of the citric acid cycle, glyoxylate cycle, and methylcitrate cycle

== Products ==
One of the major products of the methylcitrate cycle is pyruvate. This pyruvate can be used by metabolic enzymes for energy and biomass formation. The other major product, succinate, is used in the citric acid cycle and helps to carry the reaction forward and restarts the cycle. Succinate is used by the citric acid and glyoxylate cycles to generate oxaloacetate, one of the key substrates necessary to begin the methylcitrate cycle.
