= CLYBL =

Protein-coding gene in humans

Identifiers
- Aliases: CLYBL, CLB, citrate lyase beta like, citramalyl-CoA lyase
- External IDs: OMIM: 609686; MGI: 1916884; GeneCards: CLYBL
Enzyme activity
EC #	BRENDA	ExPASy	KEGG	MetaCyc
2.3.3.9	↗	↗	↗	↗
3.1.2.30	↗	↗	↗	↗
4.1.3.25	↗	↗	↗	↗

Gene location (Human)
Chr.	Chromosome 13 (human)
Band	13q32.3	Start	99,606,669 bp
Band	13q32.3	End	99,897,134 bp

Gene location (Mouse)
Chr.	Chromosome 14 (mouse)
Band	14|14 E5	Start	122,419,116 bp
Band	14|14 E5	End	122,639,646 bp
RNA expression pattern
Bgee	Human / Mouse (ortholog); Top expressed in: right lobe of liver; human kidney; muscle of thigh; mucosa of transverse colon; gastrocnemius muscle; rectum; vastus lateralis muscle; left ventricle; apex of heart; jejunal mucosa / Top expressed in: interventricular septum; right kidney; brown adipose tissue; myocardium of ventricle; human kidney; proximal tubule; secondary oocyte; intercostal muscle; cardiac muscles; soleus muscle; More reference expression data
BioGPS	n/a
Gene ontology
Molecular function	transferase activity; catalytic activity; malate synthase activity; magnesium ion binding; metal ion binding; lyase activity; (S)-citramalyl-CoA lyase activity
Cellular component	mitochondrion; membrane; integral component of membrane
Biological process	protein homotrimerization; regulation of cobalamin metabolic process
Sources:Amigo / QuickGO
Orthologs
Databases	NCBI: entry; OMA: entry
Species	Human	Mouse
Entrez	171425	69634
Ensembl	ENSG00000125246	ENSMUSG00000025545
UniProt	Q8N0X4; Q5JVC1	Q8R4N0
RefSeq (mRNA)	NM_206808	NM_029556
RefSeq (protein)	NP_996531	NP_083832
Location (UCSC)	Chr 13: 99.61 – 99.9 Mb	Chr 14: 122.42 – 122.64 Mb
PubMed search
- Wikidata
View/Edit Human	View/Edit Mouse

Citramalyl-CoA lyase, mitochondrial is an enzyme that in humans is encoded by the CLYBL gene. One of its main functions involves participating in the detoxification of poisonous vitamin B12 metabolites in the mitochondria. As part of that it converts citramalyl-CoA into acetyl-CoA and pyruvate (acting as a Citramalyl-CoA lyase), and can also detoxify malyl-CoA (acting as a malyl-CoA thioesterase). It has also been shown to be able to act as a malate synthase, but only in vitro in the lab.
