= Heiermann =

German term for the 5 Mark piece

The term Heiermann (German: [ˈhaɪɐman]) was used colloquially in some areas of Germany for the 5 Mark piece, nowadays also rarely for the 5 Euro banknote. The word probably originated at the beginning of the 20th century in the North German language area, but according to anecdotal information it spread at least as far as the Rhineland.

Occasionally (in Krefeld) the 50 Pfennig piece is said to have been described as a Heiermännchen ("little Heiermann").

== Origin of the term ==
There are several theories about the origin of the term. The etymologically most likely theory says that the term came from the Hebrew letters ה ("He", in Yiddish pronunciation "hey"). In the Hebrew, each letter has also stood for a number since biblical times, with the ה ("He") as the fifth letter of the alphabet standing for "five".

Other common derivations have a nautical connexion. One relates to the nautical term, Heuer: Around 1900, five Goldmarks was a common amount that seafarers received as earnings. According to another theory – based on rumours from the red light district of Hamburg – in the early 1950s, the DM had such high purchasing power that seafarers on the Hamburg Reeperbahn could pay five Marks to go a brothel. Since heia means "sleep" in some dialects, the five Mark piece was called the Heiermann (Heiamann); however, the fact that the expression was already in use at the beginning of the 20th century does not fit in with this.

Attempts at explanations that seek to derive the name from the former Federal President Gustav Heinemann are implausible, since he was never depicted on a coin and also the term was common long before Heinemann took office (1969).

== Literature ==
- Max Goldt: "Der schwarze Wanderbuhpokal" in Mind boggling' - Evening Post, Zurich 1998, pp. 142–144.
- Friedrich Kluge: Etymologisches Wörterbuch der deutschen Sprache ["Etymological Dictionary of the German Language"]. 24th edition. de Gruyter, Berlin 2002, entry: Heiermann. ISBN 3-11-017473-1.
- Thorsten Weiland: Das Hundeshagener Kochum. Ein Rotwelsch-Dialekt von Wandermusikanten aus dem Eichsfeld. Quellen – Wörterbuch – Analyse. Schöningh, Paderborn 2003, ISBN 3-506-79706-9. The book contains at p. 149 ff an article on Heiermann, in which the use of the word in the Kochum and its etymology in general is treated.
