= Malate synthase =

Class of enzymes

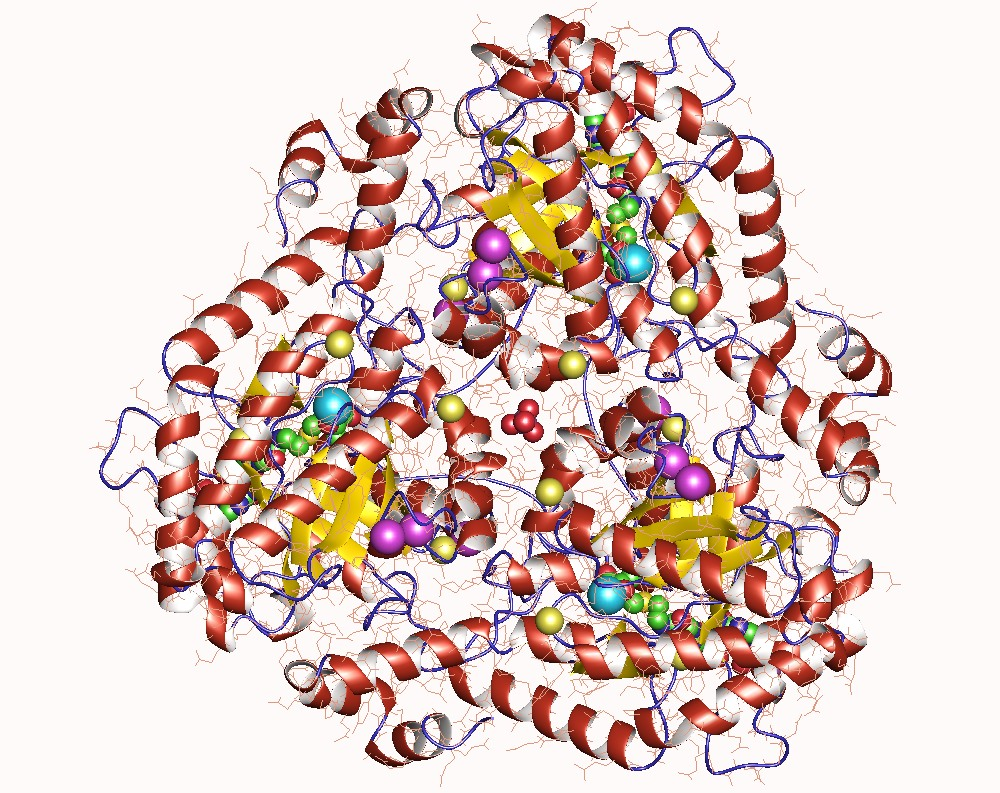
- Malate synthase homotrimer, Haloferax volcanii

Identifiers
- EC no.: 2.3.3.9
- CAS no.: 9013-48-3

Databases
- BRENDA: enzyme data
- ExPASy: NiceZyme view
- KEGG: enzyme entry
- MetaCyc: metabolic pathway
- Rhea: reactions
- PDB structures: RCSB PDB PDBe PDBsum
- Gene Ontology: AmiGO / QuickGO
Search
- PMC: articles
- PubMed: articles
- NCBI: proteins

Malate synthase (EC 2.3.3.9) is an enzyme that catalyzes the chemical reaction

glyoxylic acid
+
acetyl-CoA
H_{2}O
(S-malic acid
+ coenzyme A

The three substrates of this enzyme are glyoxylic acid, acetyl-CoA, and water. Its products are the (S) enantiomer of malic acid, and coenzyme A. This enzyme participates in pyruvate metabolism and glyoxylate and dicarboxylate metabolism.

== Nomenclature ==
This enzyme belongs to the family of transferases, specifically acyltransferases that convert acyl groups into alkyl groups on transfer. The systematic name of this enzyme class is acetyl-CoA:glyoxylate C-acetyltransferase (thioester-hydrolysing, carboxymethyl-forming). Other names in common use include L-malate glyoxylate-lyase (CoA-acetylating), glyoxylate transacetylase, glyoxylate transacetase, glyoxylic transacetase, malate condensing enzyme, malate synthetase, malic synthetase, and malic-condensing enzyme.

== Structure ==
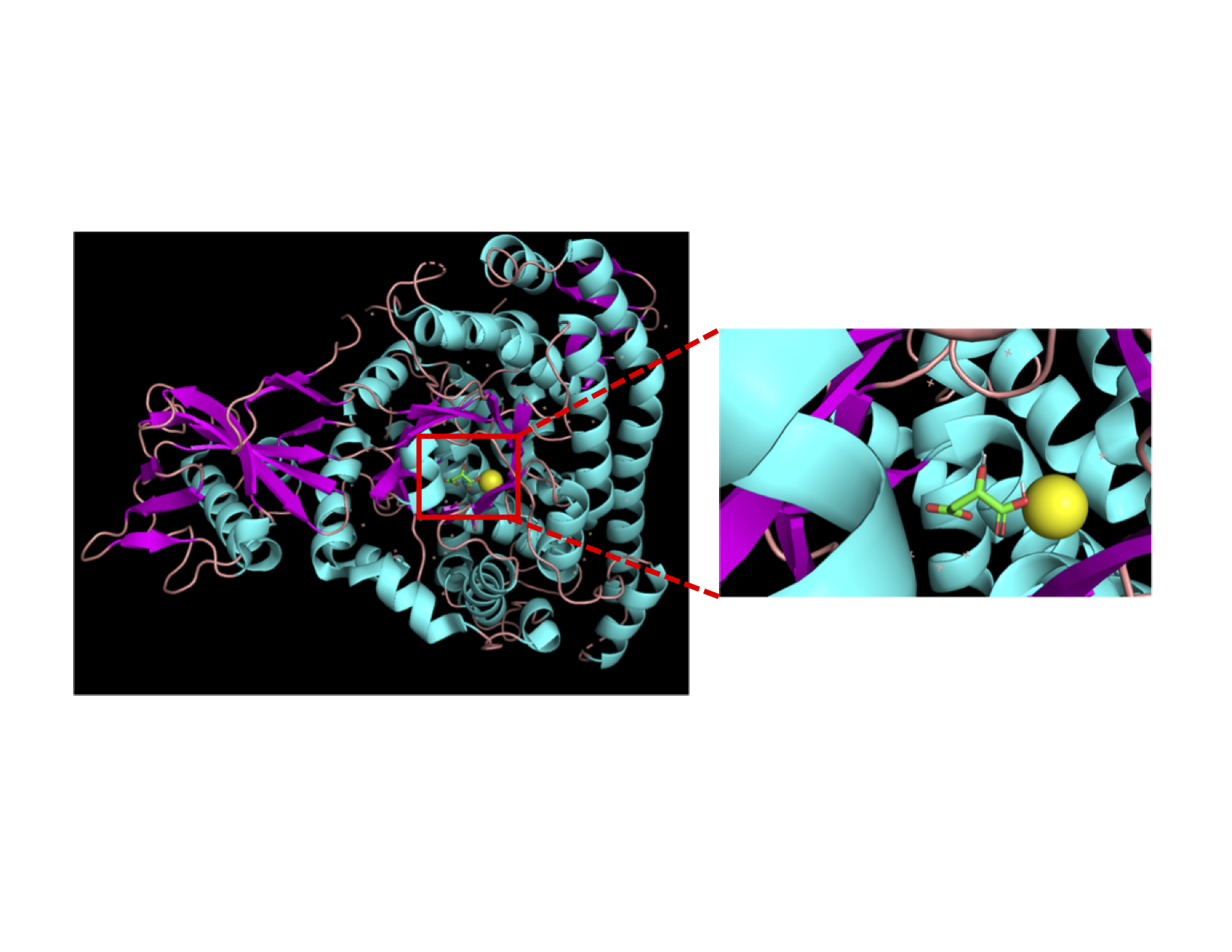
Crystallographic structure of malate synthase enzyme (left) and expand view of the active site (right) complexed with its product, malate, and a coordinating magnesium cation.

Malate synthases fall into two major families, isoforms A and G. Isoform G is monomeric with a size of about 80-kD and found exclusively in bacteria. Isoform A is about 65 kD per subunit and can form homomultimers in eukaryotes. This enzyme contains a central TIM barrel sandwiched between an N-terminal alpha-helical clasp and an alpha/beta domain stemming from two insertions into the TIM barrel sequence. The enzyme terminates with a C-terminal five-helix plug. The active site, where the acetyl-CoA and glyoxylate bind to the enzyme, lies between the TIM barrel and C-terminal plug. Upon binding, the acetyl-CoA molecule forms a J-shape inserted into the binding pocket, by an intramolecular hydrogen bond between N7 of the adenine ring and a hydroxyl group on the pantetheine tail. In addition, a critical magnesium ion within the active site coordinates with glyoxylate, glutamic acid 427, aspartic acid 455, and two water molecules. The amino acids interacting with acetyl CoA upon binding are highly conserved. Sequence identity is high within each class of isoforms, but between both classes sequence identity drops to about 15%. The alpha/beta domain, which has no apparent function, is not seen in isoform A.

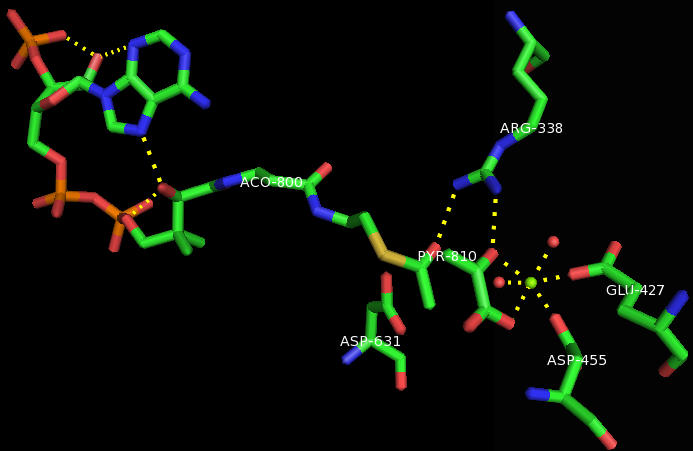
Active site of malate synthase bound to pyruvate and acetyl-CoA (ACO), which is shown in its bent J configuration. The octahedral coordinating Mg^{2+} cation is shown in green, water molecules as red dots, and polar contacts as dashed yellow lines.

== Mechanism ==
The mechanism of malate synthase is an aldol reaction followed by thioester hydrolysis. Initially, aspartate 631 acts as a catalytic base, abstracting a proton from the alpha carbon of acetyl-CoA and creating an enolate that is stabilized by arginine 338. This is considered to be the rate-determining step of the mechanism. Then, the newly formed enolate acts as a nucleophile that attacks the aldehyde of glyoxylate, imparting a negative charge on the oxygen which is stabilized by arginine 338 and the coordinating magnesium cation. This malyl-CoA intermediate then undergoes hydrolysis at the acyl-CoA portion, generating a carboxylate anion. The enzyme finally releases malate and coenzyme A.

== Function ==
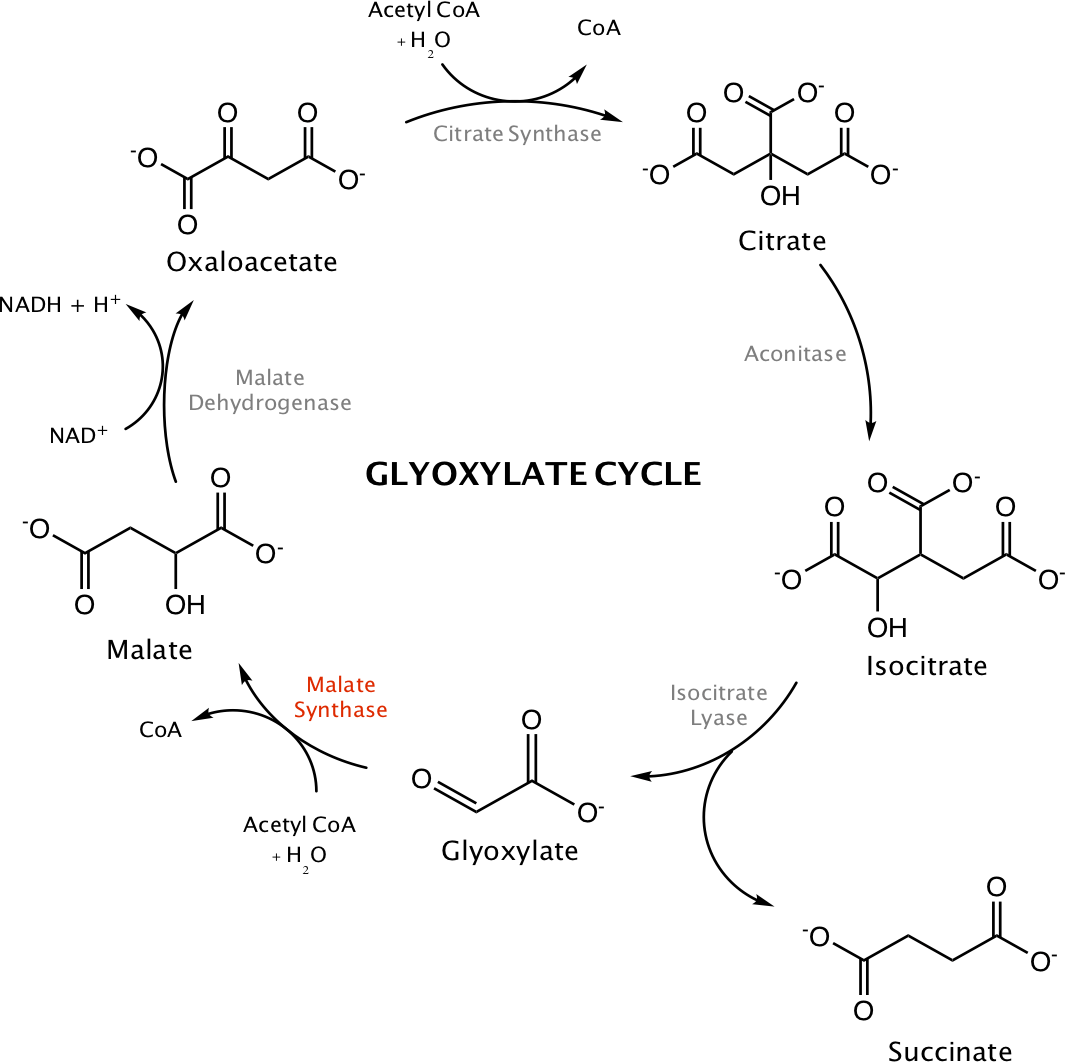
The role of malate synthase in the glyoxylate cycle.

The citric acid cycle (also known as the tricarboxylic acid cycle or the Krebs cycle) is used by aerobic organisms to produce energy via the oxidation of acetyl-CoA, which is derived from pyruvate (a product of glycolysis). The citric acid cycle accepts acetyl-CoA and metabolizes it to form carbon dioxide. A related cycle, called the glyoxylate cycle, is found in many bacteria and plants. In plants, the glyoxylate cycle takes place in glyoxysomes. In this cycle, isocitrate lyase and malate synthase skip over the decarboxylation steps of the citric acid cycle. In other words, malate synthase works together with isocitrate lyase in the glyoxylate cycle to bypass two oxidative steps of Krebs cycle and permit carbon incorporation from acetate or fatty acids in many microorganisms. Together, these two enzymes serve to produce succinate (which exits the cycle to be used for synthesis of sugars) and malate (which remains in the glyoxylate cycle). During this process, acetyl-CoA and water are used as substrates. As a result, the cell does not lose 2 molecules of carbon dioxide as it does in the Krebs cycle. The glyoxylate cycle, facilitated by malate synthase and isocitrate lyase, allows plants and bacteria to subsist on acetyl-CoA or other two carbon compounds. For example, Euglena gracilis, a single-celled eukaryotic alga, consumes ethanol to form acetyl-CoA and subsequently, carbohydrates. Within germinating plants, the glyoxylate cycle allows the conversion of reserve lipids into carbohydrates within glyoxysomes.

== Evolutionary history ==
Malate synthase is found as an octamer of identical subunits (each roughly 60kDa) in some plants, including maize. It is found as a homotetramer in the fungus Candida and as a homodimer in eubacteria. Malate synthase is fused to the C-terminus of isocitrate lyase in C. elegans, resulting in a single bifunctional protein. While there is currently not sufficient sequence information to determine the exact evolutionary history of malate synthase, plant, fungal, and C. elegans sequences are distinct and show no homologues from archaebacteria.

== Activity in humans ==
Traditionally, malate synthases are described in bacteria as part of the glyoxylate cycle, and malate synthase activity had not been reported for a human protein prior to a study by Strittmatter, et al. In this study, CLYBL was found to be a human mitochondrial enzyme with malate synthase activity. It is found in multiple eukaryotic taxa and is conserved in bacteria. CLYBL differs from other malate synthases in that it lacks a large portion of the C-terminal domain and shows lower specific activity and efficiency. CLYBL is linked to the vitamin B12 metabolism pathway because it is strongly co-expressed with MUT, MMAA, and MMAB, three members of the mitochondrial B12 pathway. Furthermore, a loss of function polymorphism, that leads to a loss of the CLYBL protein, is simultaneously associated with low levels of B12 in human plasma. While the exact mechanism of CLYBL’s involvement in B12 metabolism is not well understood, it is thought to convert citramalyl-CoA into pyruvate and acetyl-CoA. Without this conversion, itaconyl-CoA, a precursor to citramalyl-CoA, builds up in the cell leads to the inactivation of vitamin B12. This inactivation inhibits the methionine cycle, which leads to reduced serine, glycine, one-carbon, and folate metabolism.

== Clinical significance ==
Because the glyoxylate cycle occurs in bacteria and fungi, studying the mechanisms of malate synthase (as well as isocitrate lyase) is important for understanding human, animal, and plant pathogenesis. Studying malate synthase can shed light on the metabolic pathways that allow pathogens to survive inside a host as well as elucidate possible treatments. Many studies have been conducted on malate synthase activity in pathogens, including Mycobacterium tuberculosis, Pseudomonas aeruginosa, Brucella melitensis, and Escherichia coli.

=== Mycobacterium tuberculosis ===
Malate synthase and the glyoxylate pathway is especially important to M. tuberculosis, allowing long-term persistence of its infection. When cells of M. tuberculosis become phagocytosed, the bacterium upregulates genes encoding the glyoxylate shunt enzymes. Mycobacterium tuberculosis is one of the most well studied pathogens in connection to the enzyme malate synthase. The structure and kinetics of Mycobacterium tuberculosis malate synthase have been well categorized. Malate synthase is essential to Mycobacterium tuberculosis survival because it allows the bacteria to assimilate acetyl-CoA into long-chain carbohydrates and survive in harsh environments. Beyond this, malate synthase prevents toxicity from buildup of glyoxylate produced by isocitrate lyase. Downregulation of malate synthase results in reduced stress tolerance, persistence, and growth of Mycobacterium tuberculosis inside macrophages. The enzyme can be inhibited by small molecules (although inhibition is microenvironment dependent), which suggests that these may be used as new chemotherapies.

=== Pseudomonas aeruginosa ===
Pseudomonas aeruginosa causes severe infections in humans and is labeled as a critical threat by the World Health Organization because of its resistance to multiple therapies. The glyoxylate shunt is essential for Pseudomonas aeruginosa growth in a host organism. In 2017, McVey, et al. examined the 3D structure of P. aeruginosa malate synthase G. They found that it is a monomer composed of four domains and is highly conserved in other pathogens. They further utilized computational analysis to identify two binding pockets that may serve as drug targets.

=== Brucella melitensis ===
Brucella melitensis is a pathogenic bacterium that causes fever and inflammation of the epididymis in sheep and cattle and can be transmitted to humans through the consumption of unpasteurized milk. Malate synthase has been identified as a potential virulence factor in this bacterium. In 2016, Adi, et al. constructed a 3D crystallized structure of the protein to identify catalytic domains and investigate potential inhibitors. They identified five inhibitors with non-oral toxicity that served as drugs against the bacteria, suggesting possible treatment routes for brucellosis.

=== Escherichia coli ===
In Escherichia coli, the genes encoding the enzymes required for the glyoxylate cycle are expressed from the polycistronic ace operon. This operon contains genes coding for malate synthase (aceB), isocitrate lyase (aceA), and isocitrate dehydrogenase kinase/phosphatase (aceK).

== Structural Studies ==
As of early 2018, several structures have been solved for malate synthases, including those with PDB accession codes 2GQ3, 1D8C, 3OYX, 3PUG, 5TAO, 5H8M, 2JQX, 1P7T, and 1Y8B.
