= 2-methylcitrate synthase =

Class of enzymes

Identifiers
- EC no.: 2.3.3.5
- CAS no.: 57827-78-8

Databases
- IntEnz: IntEnz view
- BRENDA: BRENDA entry
- ExPASy: NiceZyme view
- KEGG: KEGG entry
- MetaCyc: metabolic pathway
- PRIAM: profile
- PDB structures: RCSB PDB PDBe PDBsum
- Gene Ontology: AmiGO / QuickGO
Search
- PMC: articles
- PubMed: articles
- NCBI: proteins

2-methylcitrate synthase (EC 2.3.3.5) is an enzyme that catalyzes the chemical reaction

oxaloacetic acid
+ propionyl-CoA
H_{2}O
(2R,3S)-2-methylcitric acid
+ coenzyme A

The three substrates of this enzyme are oxaloacetic acid, propionyl-CoA, and water. Its two products are a specific stereoisomer of 2-methylcitric acid, with coenzyme A as the byproduct. The enyme has been characterised from Candida lipolytica, Escherichia coli, and Salmonella typhimurium. The isomer produced was shown to be (2R,3S)-2-methylcitric acid. The methyl citrate product in fungi is later converted to methylisocitric acid and then to pyruvic acid and succinic acid by the enzyme methylisocitrate lyase.

This enzyme belongs to the family of transferases, specifically those acyltransferases that convert acyl groups into alkyl groups on transfer. The systematic name of this enzyme class is propanoyl-CoA:oxaloacetate C-propanoyltransferase (thioester-hydrolysing, 1-carboxyethyl-forming). Other names in common use include 2-methylcitrate oxaloacetate-lyase, MCS, methylcitrate synthase, and methylcitrate synthetase.
