= Hydroxyacid oxidase (glycolate oxidase) 1 =

Protein-coding gene in the species Homo sapiens

HAO1

Identifiers
- Aliases: HAO1, GOX, GOX1, HAOX1, Hydroxyacid oxidase (glycolate oxidase) 1, hydroxyacid oxidase 1, GO
- External IDs: OMIM: 605023; MGI: 96011; GeneCards: HAO1
Available structures
PDB	Ortholog search: PDBe RCSB
PDB	List of PDB id codes 2NZL, 2RDT, 2RDU, 2RDW, 2W0U
Enzyme activity
EC #	BRENDA	ExPASy	KEGG	MetaCyc
1.1.3.15	↗	↗	↗	↗
1.2.3.5	↗	↗	↗	↗

Gene location (Human)
Chr.	Chromosome 20 (human)
Band	20p12.3	Start	7,882,985 bp
Band	20p12.3	End	7,940,458 bp

Gene location (Mouse)
Chr.	Chromosome 2 (mouse)
Band	2 F2|2 65.65 cM	Start	134,339,281 bp
Band	2 F2|2 65.65 cM	End	134,396,288 bp
RNA expression pattern
Bgee	Human / Mouse (ortholog); Top expressed in: right lobe of liver; kidney; testicle; islet of Langerhans; human kidney; gallbladder; renal cortex; body of pancreas; blood; intestinal epithelium / Top expressed in: left lobe of liver; lumbar spinal ganglion; sexually immature organism; spermatid; blastocyst; ureter; atrioventricular valve; medial head of gastrocnemius muscle; thoracic diaphragm; pancreas; More reference expression data
BioGPS	n/a
Gene ontology
Molecular function	(S)-2-hydroxy-acid oxidase activity; oxidoreductase activity; FMN binding; signaling receptor binding; catalytic activity; glyoxylate oxidase activity
Cellular component	peroxisome; peroxisomal matrix; cytosol
Biological process	fatty acid alpha-oxidation; response to oxidative stress; glycolate catabolic process; cellular nitrogen compound metabolic process; protein targeting to peroxisome
Sources:Amigo / QuickGO
Orthologs
Databases	NCBI: entry; OMA: entry
Species	Human	Mouse
Entrez	54363	15112
Ensembl	ENSG00000101323	ENSMUSG00000027261
UniProt	Q9UJM8	Q9WU19
RefSeq (mRNA)	NM_017545	NM_010403
RefSeq (protein)	NP_060015	NP_034533
Location (UCSC)	Chr 20: 7.88 – 7.94 Mb	Chr 2: 134.34 – 134.4 Mb
PubMed search
- Wikidata
View/Edit Human	View/Edit Mouse

Hydroxyacid oxidase (glycolate oxidase) 1 is a protein that in humans is encoded by the HAO1 gene.

== Function ==
This gene is one of three related genes that have 2-hydroxyacid oxidase activity yet differ in encoded protein amino acid sequence, tissue expression and substrate preference. Subcellular location of the encoded protein is the peroxisome. Specifically, this gene is expressed primarily in liver and pancreas, and the encoded protein is most active on glycolate, a two-carbon substrate. Glycolate oxidase oxidizes glycolic acid to glyoxylate, and can also oxidize glyoxylate into oxalate. These reactions are central to the toxicity of ethylene glycol poisoning.

The protein is also active on 2-hydroxy fatty acids. The transcript detected at high levels in pancreas may represent an alternatively spliced form or the use of a multiple near-consensus upstream polyadenylation site.
