= Citramalyl-CoA lyase =

citramalyl-CoA lyase

Identifiers
- EC no.: 4.1.3.25
- CAS no.: 37290-68-9

Databases
- IntEnz: IntEnz view
- BRENDA: BRENDA entry
- ExPASy: NiceZyme view
- KEGG: KEGG entry
- MetaCyc: metabolic pathway
- PRIAM: profile
- PDB structures: RCSB PDB PDBe PDBsum
- Gene Ontology: AmiGO / QuickGO
Search
- PMC: articles
- PubMed: articles
- NCBI: proteins

The enzyme citramalyl-CoA lyase (EC 4.1.3.25) catalyzes the chemical reaction

(3S)-citramalyl-CoA $\rightleftharpoons$ acetyl-CoA + pyruvate

This enzyme belongs to the family of lyases, specifically the oxo-acid-lyases, which cleave carbon-carbon bonds. The systematic name of this enzyme class is (3S)-citramalyl-CoA pyruvate-lyase (acetyl-CoA-forming). Other names in common use include citramalyl coenzyme A lyase, (+)-CMA-CoA lyase, and (3S)-citramalyl-CoA pyruvate-lyase. This enzyme participates in pyruvate metabolism and c5-branched dibasic acid metabolism.
