= Phosphonopyruvate decarboxylase =

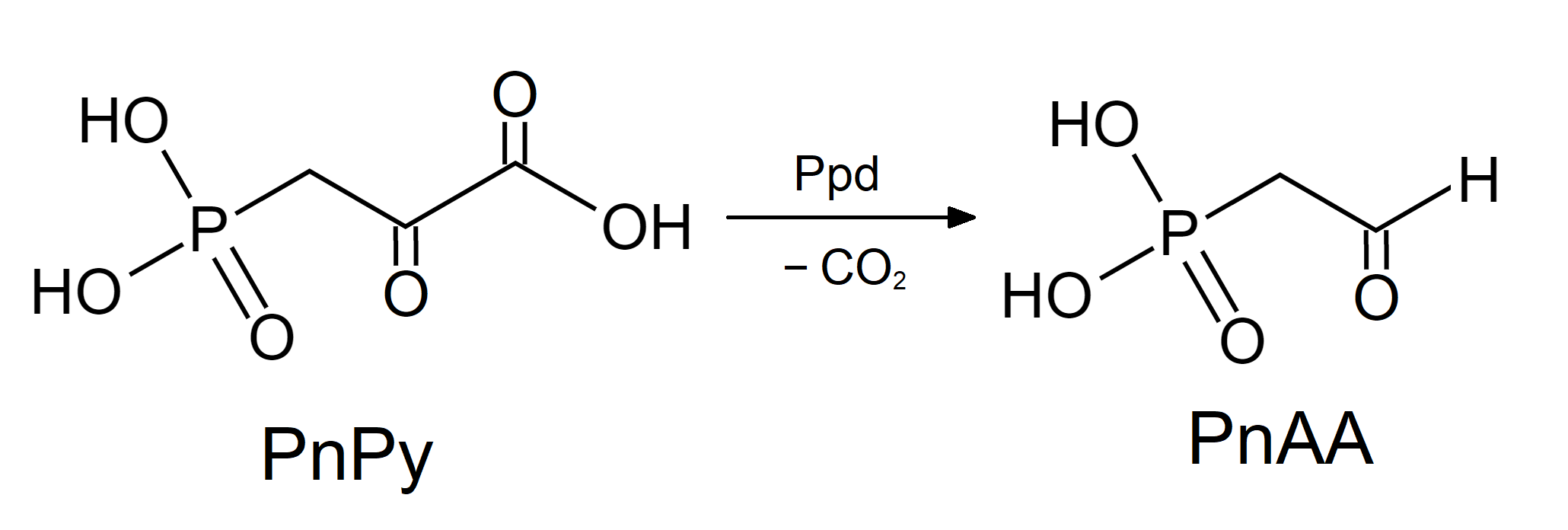
- A reaction using Ppd as a catalyst

Identifiers
- EC no.: 4.1.1.82

Databases
- IntEnz: IntEnz view
- BRENDA: BRENDA entry
- ExPASy: NiceZyme view
- KEGG: KEGG entry
- MetaCyc: metabolic pathway
- PRIAM: profile
- PDB structures: RCSB PDB PDBe PDBsum
Search
- PMC: articles
- PubMed: articles
- NCBI: proteins

The enzyme phosphonopyruvate decarboxylase (EC 4.1.1.82) catalyzes the chemical reaction

3-phosphonopyruvate $\rightleftharpoons$ 2-phosphonoacetaldehyde + CO_{2}

This enzyme belongs to the family of lyases, specifically the carboxy-lyases, which cleave carbon-carbon bonds. The systematic name of this enzyme class is 3-phosphonopyruvate carboxy-lyase (2-phosphonoacetaldehyde-forming). This enzyme is also called 3-phosphonopyruvate carboxy-lyase. This enzyme participates in aminophosphonate metabolism.
