= Plausibility structure =

Sociology concept

In sociology and especially the sociological study of religion, plausibility structures are the sociocultural contexts for systems of meaning within which these meanings make sense, or are made plausible. Beliefs and meanings held by individuals and groups are supported by, and embedded in, sociocultural institutions and processes.

== Origins ==
The term was coined by Peter L. Berger, who says he draws his meaning of it from the ideas of Karl Marx, G. H. Mead, and Alfred Schutz. For Berger, the relation between plausibility structure and social "world" is dialectical, the one supporting the other which, in turn, can react back upon the first. Social arrangements may help, say, a certain religious world appear self-evident. This religious outlook may then help to shape the arrangements that contributed to its rise.

== Decline of religious plausibility ==
Berger was particularly concerned with the loss of plausibility of the sacred in a modernist/postmodern world. Berger considered that history "constructs and deconstructs plausibility structures", and that the plurality of modern social worlds was "an important cause of the diminishing plausibility of religious traditions."

== Criticism ==
Critics have argued that Berger pays too much attention to discourse analysis and not enough to the institutional frameworks that continue to support religious belief.

Berger may also underestimate the role of self-selected reference groups in maintaining one's plausibility structures, as well as the erosion of the modernist trend of secularization that took place with postmodernism.

== See also ==
- Lifeworld
- Base and superstructure
- Sociology of knowledge
- Episteme
- Belief revision
