= Carboxyvinyl-carboxyphosphonate phosphorylmutase =

carboxyvinyl-carboxyphosphonate phosphorylmutase

Identifiers
- EC no.: 2.7.8.23
- CAS no.: 122799-57-9

Databases
- IntEnz: IntEnz view
- BRENDA: BRENDA entry
- ExPASy: NiceZyme view
- KEGG: KEGG entry
- MetaCyc: metabolic pathway
- PRIAM: profile
- PDB structures: RCSB PDB PDBe PDBsum
- Gene Ontology: AmiGO / QuickGO
Search
- PMC: articles
- PubMed: articles
- NCBI: proteins

In enzymology, a carboxyvinyl-carboxyphosphonate phosphorylmutase (EC 2.7.8.23) is an enzyme that catalyzes the chemical reaction

1-carboxyvinyl carboxyphosphonate $\rightleftharpoons$ 3-(hydrohydroxyphosphoryl)pyruvate + CO_{2}

Hence, this enzyme has one substrate, 1-carboxyvinyl carboxyphosphonate, and two products, 3-(hydrohydroxyphosphoryl)pyruvate and CO_{2}.

This enzyme belongs to the family of transferases, specifically those transferring non-standard substituted phosphate groups. The systematic name of this enzyme class is 1-carboxyvinyl carboxyphosphonate phosphorylmutase (decarboxylating).

== Structural studies ==
As of late 2007, only one structure has been solved for this class of enzymes, with the PDB accession code 2QIW.
