= Glyoxysome =

Specialized organelle found in plants

Glyoxysomes are specialized peroxisomes found in plants (particularly in the fat storage tissues of germinating seeds) and also in filamentous fungi. Seeds that contain fats and oils include corn, soybean, sunflower, peanut and pumpkin. As in all peroxisomes, in glyoxysomes, the fatty acids are oxidized to acetyl-CoA by peroxisomal β-oxidation enzymes. When the fatty acids are oxidized, hydrogen peroxide (H_{2}O_{2}) is produced as oxygen (O_{2}) is consumed. Thus, the seeds need oxygen to germinate. Besides peroxisomal functions, glyoxysomes additionally possess the key enzymes of the glyoxylate cycle (isocitrate lyase and malate synthase) which accomplish the glyoxylate cycle bypass.

Thus, glyoxysomes (as all peroxisomes) contain enzymes that initiate the breakdown of fatty acids and additionally possess the enzymes to produce intermediate products for the synthesis of sugars by gluconeogenesis. The seedling uses these sugars synthesized from fats until it is mature enough to produce them by photosynthesis.

Plant peroxisomes also participate in photorespiration and nitrogen metabolism in root nodules.
