= Fructolysis =

Metabolism of fructose

Fructolysis refers to the metabolism of fructose from dietary sources. Though the metabolism of glucose through glycolysis uses many of the same enzymes and intermediate structures as those in fructolysis, the two sugars have very different metabolic fates in human metabolism. Under one percent of ingested fructose is directly converted to plasma triglyceride. 29% - 54% of fructose is converted in the liver to glucose, and about a quarter of fructose is converted to lactate. 15% - 18% is converted to glycogen. Glucose and lactate are then used normally as energy to fuel cells all over the body.

Fructose is a dietary monosaccharide present naturally in fruits and vegetables, either as free fructose or as part of the disaccharide sucrose, and as its polymer inulin. It is also present in the form of refined sugars including granulated sugars (white crystalline table sugar, brown sugar, confectioner's sugar, and turbinado sugar), refined crystalline fructose, as high fructose corn syrups as well as in honey. About 10% of the calories contained in the Western diet are supplied by fructose (approximately 55 g/day).

Unlike glucose, fructose is not an insulin secretagogue, and can in fact lower circulating insulin. In addition to the liver, fructose is metabolized in the intestines, testis, kidney, skeletal muscle, fat tissue and brain, but it is not transported into cells via insulin-sensitive pathways (insulin regulated transporters GLUT1 and GLUT4). Instead, fructose is taken in by GLUT5. Fructose in muscles and adipose tissue is phosphorylated by hexokinase.

== Fructolysis and glycolysis are independent pathways ==
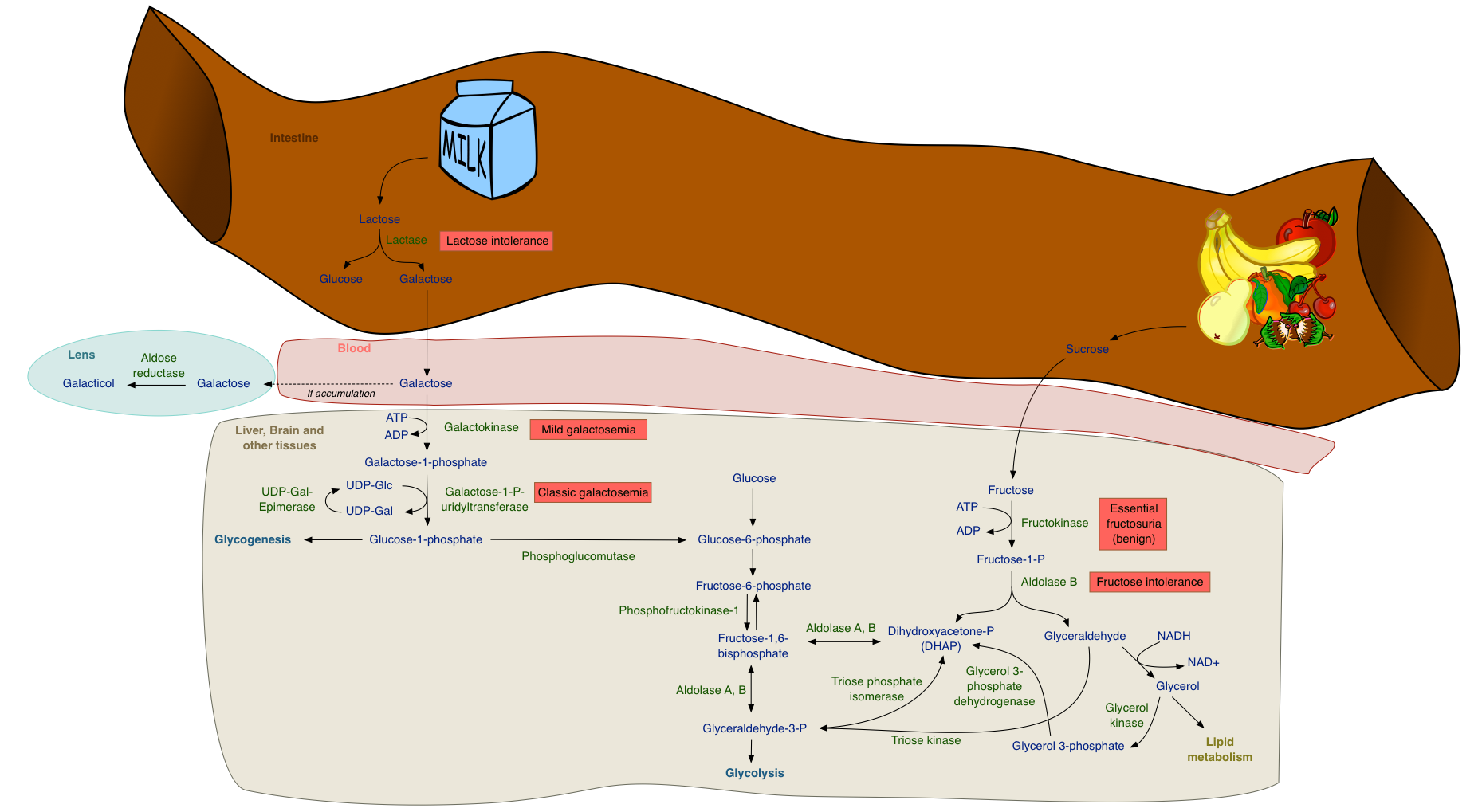
Fructose and galactose metabolism

Although the metabolism of fructose and glucose share many of the same intermediate structures, they have very different metabolic fates in human metabolism. Fructose is metabolized almost completely in the liver in humans, and is directed toward replenishment of liver glycogen and triglyceride synthesis, while much of dietary glucose passes through the liver and goes to skeletal muscle, where it is metabolized to CO_{2}, H_{2}O and ATP, and to fat cells where it is metabolized primarily to glycerol phosphate for triglyceride synthesis as well as energy production. The products of fructose metabolism are liver glycogen and de novo lipogenesis of fatty acids and eventual synthesis of endogenous triglyceride. This synthesis can be divided into two main phases: The first phase is the synthesis of the trioses, dihydroxyacetone (DHAP) and glyceraldehyde; the second phase is the subsequent metabolism of these trioses either in the gluconeogenic pathway for glycogen replenishment and/or the complete metabolism in the fructolytic pathway to pyruvate, which enters the Krebs cycle, is converted to citrate and subsequently directed toward de novo synthesis of the free fatty acid palmitate.

=== The metabolism of fructose to DHAP and glyceraldehyde ===
The first step in the metabolism of fructose is the phosphorylation of fructose to fructose 1-phosphate by fructokinase (Km = 0.5 mM, ≈ 9 mg/100 ml), thus trapping fructose for metabolism in the liver. Hexokinase IV (Glucokinase), also occurs in the liver and would be capable of phosphorylating fructose to fructose 6-phosphate (an intermediate in the gluconeogenic pathway); however, it has a relatively high Km (12 mM) for fructose and, therefore, essentially all of the fructose is converted to fructose-1-phosphate in the human liver. Much of the glucose, on the other hand, is not phosphorylated (Km of hepatic glucokinase (hexokinase IV) = 10 mM), passes through the liver directed toward peripheral tissues, and is taken up by the insulin-dependent glucose transporter, GLUT 4, present on adipose tissue and skeletal muscle.

Fructose-1-phosphate then undergoes hydrolysis by fructose-1-phosphate aldolase (aldolase B) to form dihydroxyacetone phosphate (DHAP) and glyceraldehyde; DHAP can either be isomerized to glyceraldehyde 3-phosphate by triosephosphate isomerase or undergo reduction to glycerol 3-phosphate by glycerol 3-phosphate dehydrogenase. The glyceraldehyde produced may also be converted to glyceraldehyde 3-phosphate by glyceraldehyde kinase or converted to glycerol 3-phosphate by glyceraldehyde 3-phosphate dehydrogenase. The metabolism of fructose at this point yields intermediates in gluconeogenic pathway leading to glycogen synthesis, or can be oxidized to pyruvate and reduced to lactate, or be decarboxylated to acetyl CoA in the mitochondria and directed toward the synthesis of free fatty acid, resulting finally in triglyceride synthesis.

Figure 1: The metabolic conversion of fructose to DHAP, glyceraldehyde and glyceraldehyde-3-Phosphate in the liver

=== Synthesis of glycogen from DHAP and glyceraldehyde-3-phosphate ===
The synthesis of glycogen in the liver following a fructose-containing meal proceeds from gluconeogenic precursors. Fructose is initially converted to DHAP and glyceraldehyde by fructokinase and aldolase B. The resultant glyceraldehyde then undergoes phosphorylation to glyceraldehyde-3-phosphate. Increased concentrations of DHAP and glyceraldehyde-3-phosphate in the liver drive the gluconeogenic pathway toward glucose-6-phosphate, glucose-1-phosphate and glycogen formation. It appears that fructose is a better substrate for glycogen synthesis than glucose and that glycogen replenishment takes precedence over triglyceride formation. Once liver glycogen is replenished, the intermediates of fructose metabolism are primarily directed toward triglyceride synthesis.

Figure 2: The metabolic conversion of fructose to glycogen in the liver

=== Synthesis of triglyceride from DHAP and glyceraldehyde-3-phosphate ===
Carbons from dietary fructose are found in both the FFA and glycerol moieties of plasma triglycerides (TG). Excess dietary fructose can be converted to pyruvate, enter the Krebs cycle and emerges as citrate directed toward free fatty acid synthesis in the cytosol of hepatocytes. The DHAP formed during fructolysis can also be converted to glycerol and then glycerol 3-phosphate for TG synthesis. Thus, fructose can provide trioses for both the glycerol 3-phosphate backbone, as well as the free fatty acids in TG synthesis. Indeed, fructose may provide the bulk of the carbohydrate directed toward de novo TG synthesis in humans.

Figure 3: The metabolic conversion of fructose to triglyceride (TG) in the liver

=== Fructose induces hepatic lipogenic enzymes ===
Fructose consumption results in the insulin-independent induction of several important hepatic lipogenic enzymes including pyruvate kinase, NADP^{+}-dependent malate dehydrogenase, citrate lyase, acetyl CoA carboxylase, fatty acid synthase, as well as pyruvate dehydrogenase. Although not a consistent finding among metabolic feeding studies, diets high in refined fructose have been shown to lead to hypertriglyceridemia in a wide range of populations including individuals with normal glucose metabolism as well as individuals with impaired glucose tolerance, diabetes, hypertriglyceridemia, and hypertension. The hypertriglyceridemic effects observed are a hallmark of increased dietary carbohydrate, and fructose appears to be dependent on a number of factors including the amount of dietary fructose consumed and degree of insulin resistance.

Table 1: Hepatic lipogenic enzyme activity ^{‡} in control and streptozotocin-induced diabetic rats^{§} follow a 14-day period with or without 25% fructose diet
Group	Pyruvate Kinase	NADPH-Malate Dehydrogenase	Citrate Lyase	Acetyl CoA Carboxylase	Fatty Acid Synthase
Control Animals					
Control Diet	495 ± 23	35 ± 5	21 ± 3	6.5 ± 1.0	3.6 ± 0.5
Fructose Diet	1380 ± 110*	126 ± 9*	69 ± 7*	22.5 ± 2.7*	10.8 ± 1.4*
Diabetic Animals					
Control Diet	196 ± 21	14 ± 3	9 ± 2	3.1 ± 0.8	1.4 ± 0.6
Fructose Diet	648 ± 105*	70 ± 9*	37 ± 6*	10.3 ± 2.0*	3.9 ± 0.9*

‡ = Mean ± SEM activity in nmol/min per mg protein

§ = 12 rats/group

* = Significantly different from control at p < 0.05

== Abnormalities in fructose metabolism ==
The lack of two important enzymes in fructose metabolism results in the development of two inborn errors in carbohydrate metabolism – essential fructosuria and hereditary fructose intolerance. In addition, reduced phosphorylation potential within hepatocytes can occur with intravenous infusion of fructose.

=== Inborn errors in fructose metabolism ===
==== Essential fructosuria ====
The absence of fructokinase results in the inability to phosphorylate fructose to fructose-1-phosphate within the cell. As a result, fructose is neither trapped within the cell nor directed toward its metabolism. Free fructose concentrations in the liver increase and fructose is free to leave the cell and enter plasma. This results in an increase in plasma concentration of fructose, eventually exceeding the kidneys' threshold for fructose reabsorption resulting in the appearance of fructose in the urine. Essential fructosuria is a benign asymptomatic condition.

==== Hereditary fructose intolerance ====
The absence of fructose-1-phosphate aldolase (aldolase B) results in the accumulation of fructose 1 phosphate in hepatocytes, kidney and small intestines. An accumulation of fructose-1-phosphate following fructose ingestion inhibits glycogenolysis (breakdown of glycogen) and gluconeogenesis, resulting in severe hypoglycemia. It is symptomatic resulting in severe hypoglycemia, abdominal pain, vomiting, hemorrhage, jaundice, hepatomegaly, and hyperuricemia eventually leading to liver and/or kidney failure and death. The incidence varies throughout the world, but it is estimated at 1:55,000 (range 1:10,000 to 1:100,000) live births.

=== Reduced phosphorylation potential ===
Intravenous (i.v.) infusion of fructose has been shown to lower phosphorylation potential in liver cells by trapping inorganic phosphate (Pi) as fructose 1-phosphate. The fructokinase reaction occurs quite rapidly in hepatocytes trapping fructose in cells by phosphorylation. On the other hand, the splitting of fructose 1 phosphate to DHAP and glyceraldehyde by Aldolase B is relatively slow. Therefore, fructose-1-phosphate accumulates with the corresponding reduction of intracellular Pi available for phosphorylation reactions in the cell. This is why fructose is contraindicated for total parenteral nutrition (TPN) solutions and is never given intravenously as a source of carbohydrate. It has been suggested that excessive dietary intake of fructose may also result in reduced phosphorylation potential. However, this is still a contentious issue. Dietary fructose is not well absorbed and increased dietary intake often results in malabsorption. Whether or not sufficient amounts of dietary fructose could be absorbed to cause a significant reduction in phosphorylating potential in liver cells remains questionable and there are no clear examples of this in the literature.
