= Fructosephosphates =

Class of chemical compounds

Fructose phosphates are sugar phosphates based upon fructose, and are common in the biochemistry of cells. A fructose phosphate is formed when fructose is phosphorylated through the addition of an inorganic phosphate group (P_{i}).

Fructose is a naturally occurring monosaccharide and is referred to as a "fruit sugar" due to existing in virtually every fruit. Fructose is a six-carbon molecule and can be drawn as a linear chain (Fischer Projection) or a ring-like structure (Haworth Projection), consisting of carbon and hydroxyl groups. Inorganic phosphate is an anion that plays a fundamental role in various key biological processes.

Fructose phosphates play integral roles in many metabolic pathways, particularly glycolysis, gluconeogenesis, oxidative phosphorylation, and lipogenesis. Furthermore, biomedical research has increasingly demonstrated the role of fructose phosphates in metabolic processes and how dysregulation of their production or metabolism can contribute to several human diseases.

== Role in Metabolism ==
Fructose phosphorylation and dephosphorylation events involve specific enzymes that either add or remove phosphate groups depending on the cellular context. All known enzymatic phosphorylations of fructose (i.e., hexokinase, fructokinase, or phosphofructokinase-1) are ATP-dependent. All of these enzymes use Adenosine Triphosphate (ATP) as the phosphate donor to transfer the γ-phosphate to fructose or fructose-derivatives under normal physiological conditions. On the other hand, dephosphorylation reactions of fructose are not ATP-dependent, but rather are hydrolytic and catalyzed by phosphatases (e.g., fructose 1,6-bisphosphatase, fructose 2,6-bisphosphatase, or phosphoprotein phosphatase). Furthermore, these reactions do not require ATP due to being energetically favorable, and thus, use water to cleave the phosphate ester bond and release a P_{i}.

Examples of major biologically active fructose phosphates are:

- Fructose 1-phosphate
- Fructose 2-phosphate
- Fructose 3-phosphate
- Fructose 6-phosphate
- Fructose 1,6-bisphosphate
- Fructose 2,6-bisphosphate

Each fructose phosphate plays a specific role in metabolism. For example, fructose 2,6-bisphosphate is an important allosteric regulator for the correlated regulation of glycolysis and gluconeogenesis based on hormonal nutritional signals. However, if fructose 2,6-bisphosphate levels become unregulated and result in a decrease in its production, gluconeogenesis is favored over glycolysis, which contributes to hepatic glucose output in diabetes.

== Applications ==
Because of fructose phosphates' critical role in metabolism, their relevance spans clinical, dietary, and therapeutic contexts, including:

- Hereditary fructose intolerance (HFI)
- Fructose 1,6-bisphosphate deficiency
- Metabolic syndrome and obesity
- Targeting the inhibition of ketohexokinase as potential therapeutic strategy for fructose-induced metabolic disease.

== Nutritional science and guidelines ==
Dietary fructose should be consumed in moderate amounts from around 25-40 g/day. However, the value may be different according to an individual's body structure and composition. Excessive intake of fructose may result in negative health outcomes, but should not be taken to be the only factor for any metabolic disease.
