= C6H13O9P =

The molecular formula C_{6}H_{13}O_{9}P may refer to:

- Fructose 1-phosphate
- Fructose 6-phosphate
- Galactose 1-phosphate
- Glucose 1-phosphate
- Glucose 6-phosphate
- Mannose 1-phosphate
- Mannose 6-phosphate
