= Glucose-6-phosphate isomerase =

Mammalian protein found in Homo sapiens

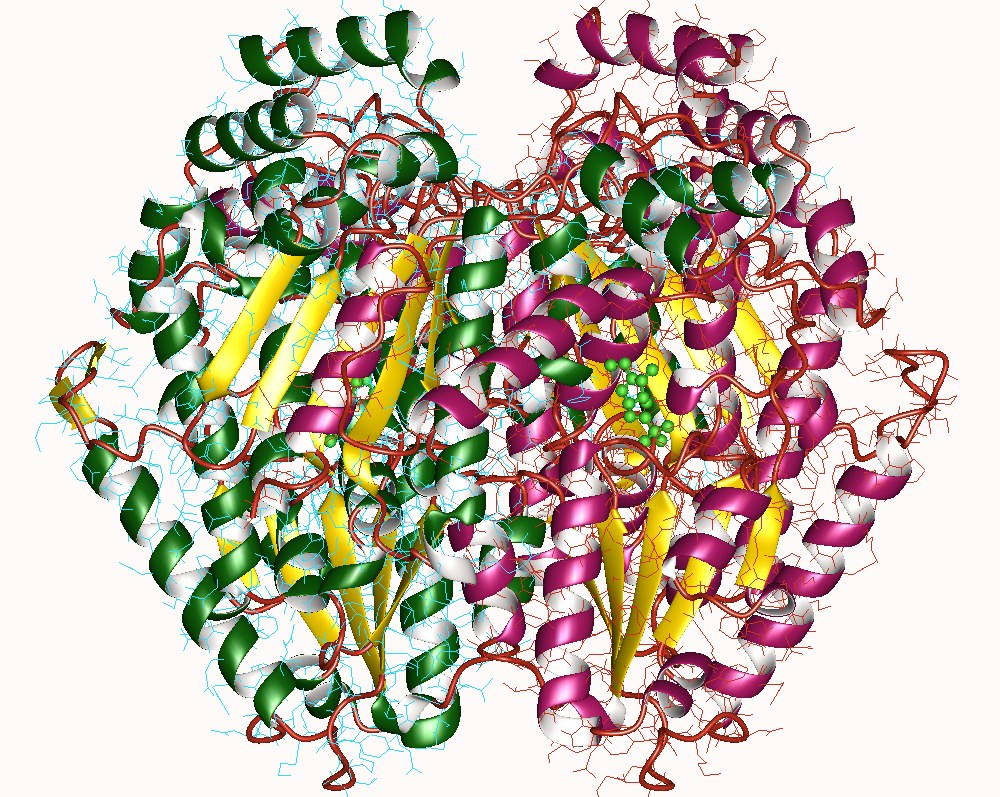
- Glucose-6-phosphate isomerase dimer, Rabbit

Identifiers
- EC no.: 5.3.1.9
- CAS no.: 9001-41-6

Databases
- BRENDA: enzyme data
- ExPASy: NiceZyme view
- KEGG: enzyme entry
- MetaCyc: metabolic pathway
- Rhea: reactions
- PDB structures: RCSB PDB PDBe PDBsum
- Gene Ontology: AmiGO / QuickGO
Search
- PMC: articles
- PubMed: articles
- NCBI: proteins

Bacterial phosphoglucose isomerase C-terminal region
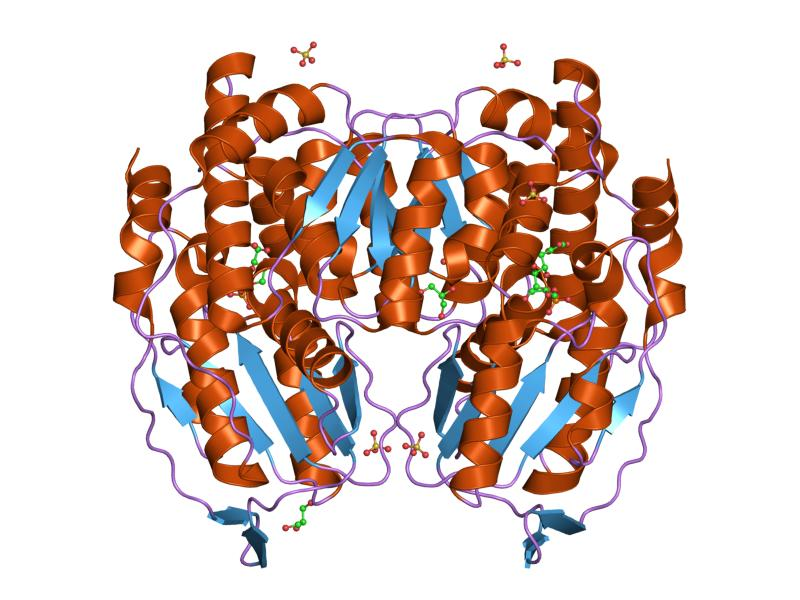
- crystal structure of phosphoglucose/phosphomannose isomerase from pyrobaculum aerophilum in complex with fructose 6-phosphate

Identifiers
- Symbol: bact-PGI_C
- Pfam: PF10432
- InterPro: IPR019490
- CDD: cd05016
Available protein structures:
- PDB: IPR019490 PF10432 (ECOD; PDBsum)
- AlphaFold: IPR019490; PF10432

Phosphoglucose isomeras

Identifiers
- Symbol: PGI
- Pfam: PF00342
- SCOP2: 1pgi / SCOPe / SUPFAM
- CDD: cd05015
Available protein structures:
- PDB: PF00342 (ECOD; PDBsum)
- AlphaFold: PF00342

GPI
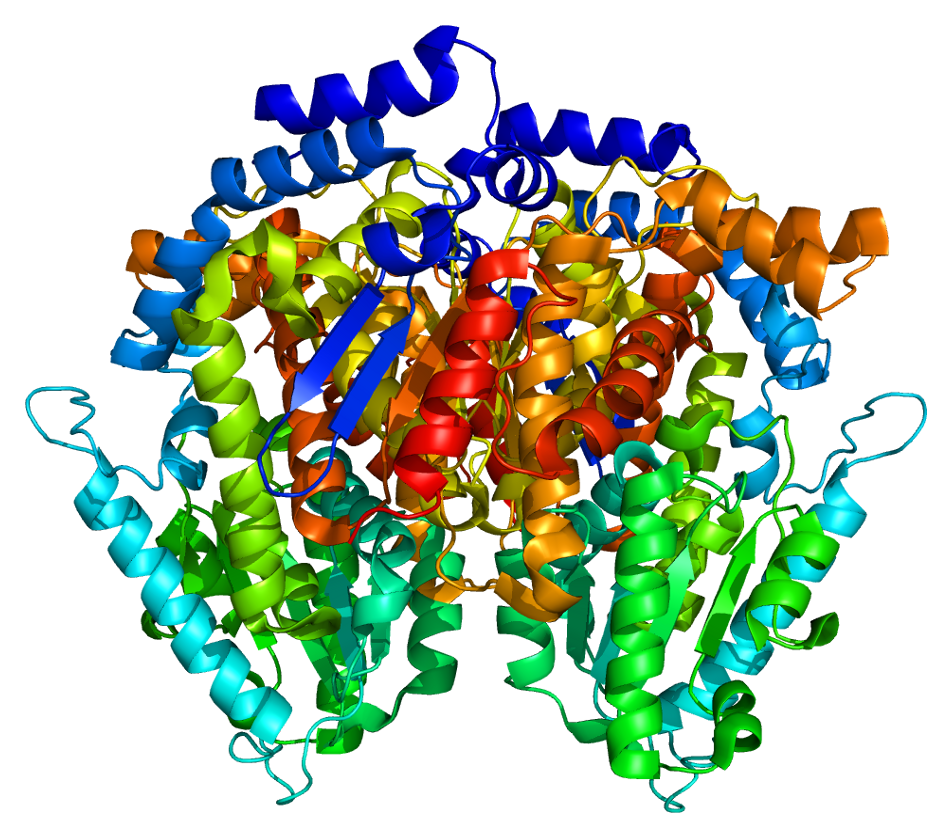

Identifiers
- Aliases: GPI, AMF, GNPI, NLK, PGI, PHI, SA-36, SA36, glucose-6-phosphate isomerase
- External IDs: OMIM: 172400; GeneCards: GPI
Available structures
| PDB | Human UniProt search: PDBe RCSB |
| PDB | List of PDB id codes 1NUH, 1IAT, 1IRI, 1JIQ, 1JLH |
Enzyme activity
| EC # | BRENDA | ExPASy | KEGG | MetaCyc |
|---|---|---|---|---|
| 5.3.1.9 | ↗ | ↗ | ↗ | ↗ |

Gene location (Human)
| Chr. | Chromosome 19 (human) |
| Band | 19q13.11 | Start | 34,359,480 bp |
| Band | 19q13.11 | End | 34,402,413 bp |
RNA expression pattern
| Bgee | Human / Mouse (ortholog); Top expressed in: apex of heart; right adrenal gland; right adrenal cortex; right frontal lobe; left adrenal gland; right hemisphere of cerebellum; left ventricle; left adrenal cortex; right auricle of heart; prefrontal cortex / n/a; More reference expression data |
| BioGPS | n/a |
Gene ontology
| Molecular function | cytokine activity; monosaccharide binding; intramolecular transferase activity; glucose-6-phosphate isomerase activity; isomerase activity; growth factor activity; ubiquitin protein ligase binding |
| Cellular component | membrane; myelin sheath; plasma membrane; nucleoplasm; ciliary membrane; neuron projection; extracellular exosome; extracellular region; extracellular space; cytoplasm; cytosol; secretory granule lumen; ficolin-1-rich granule lumen |
| Biological process | negative regulation of neuron apoptotic process; hemostasis; gluconeogenesis; negative regulation of cysteine-type endopeptidase activity involved in apoptotic process; glycolytic process; glucose homeostasis; canonical glycolysis; mesoderm formation; aldehyde catabolic process; in utero embryonic development; erythrocyte homeostasis; humoral immune response; methylglyoxal biosynthetic process; angiogenesis; learning or memory; glucose 6-phosphate metabolic process; response to progesterone; response to morphine; response to immobilization stress; response to estradiol; response to testosterone; response to cadmium ion; response to muscle stretch; neutrophil degranulation; carbohydrate metabolic process; regulation of signaling receptor activity; positive regulation of endothelial cell migration; signal transduction |
Sources:Amigo / QuickGO
Orthologs
| Databases | NCBI: entry; OMA: entry |
| Species | Human | Mouse |
| Entrez | 2821 | 14751 |
| Ensembl | ENSG00000282019; ENSG00000105220 | ENSMUSG00000036427 |
| UniProt | P06744 | n/a |
| RefSeq (mRNA) | NM_000175; NM_001184722; NM_001289789; NM_001289790; NM_001329909 NM_001329910; NM_001329911 | NM_008155 |
| RefSeq (protein) | NP_000166; NP_001171651; NP_001276718; NP_001276719; NP_001316838 NP_001316839; NP_001316840 | n/a |
| Location (UCSC) | Chr 19: 34.36 – 34.4 Mb | n/a |
| PubMed search |
- Wikidata
| View/Edit Human | View/Edit Mouse |

Glucose-6-phosphate isomerase (GPI), alternatively known as phosphoglucose isomerase/phosphoglucoisomerase (PGI) or phosphohexose isomerase (PHI), is an enzyme ( EC 5.3.1.9) that in humans is encoded by the GPI gene on chromosome 19. This gene encodes a member of the glucose phosphate isomerase protein family. The encoded protein has been identified as a moonlighting protein based on its ability to perform mechanistically distinct functions. In the cytoplasm, the gene product functions as a glycolytic enzyme (glucose-6-phosphate isomerase) that interconverts glucose-6-phosphate (G6P) and fructose-6-phosphate (F6P). Extracellularly, the encoded protein (also referred to as neuroleukin) functions as a neurotrophic factor that promotes survival of skeletal motor neurons and sensory neurons, and as a lymphokine that induces immunoglobulin secretion. The encoded protein is also referred to as autocrine motility factor (AMF) based on an additional function as a tumor-secreted cytokine and angiogenic factor. Defects in this gene are the cause of nonspherocytic hemolytic anemia, and a severe enzyme deficiency can be associated with hydrops fetalis, immediate neonatal death and neurological impairment. Alternative splicing results in multiple transcript variants. [provided by RefSeq, Jan 2014]

== Structure ==
Functional GPI is a 64-kDa dimer composed of two identical monomers. The two monomers interact notably through the two protrusions in a hugging embrace. The active site of each monomer is formed by a cleft between the two domains and the dimer interface.

GPI monomers are made of two domains, one made of two separate segments called the large domain and the other made of the segment in between called the small domain. The two domains are each αβα sandwiches, with the small domain containing a five-strand β-sheet surrounded by α-helices while the large domain has a six-stranded β-sheet. The large domain, located at the N-terminal, and the C-terminal of each monomer also contain "arm-like" protrusions. Several residues in the small domain serve to bind phosphate, while other residues, particularly His^{388}, from the large and C-terminal domains are crucial to the sugar ring-opening step catalyzed by this enzyme. Since the isomerization activity occurs at the dimer interface, the dimer structure of this enzyme is critical to its catalytic function.

It is hypothesized that serine phosphorylation of this protein induces a conformational change to its secretory form.

== Mechanism ==
The mechanism that GPI uses to interconvert glucose 6-phosphate and fructose 6-phosphate (aldose to ketose) consists of three major steps: opening the glucose ring, isomerizing glucose into fructose through an enediol intermediate, and closing the fructose ring.

=== Isomerization of glucose ===
| D-Glucose | Phosphoglucose isomerase | D-Fructose |
| | Phosphoglucose isomerase |

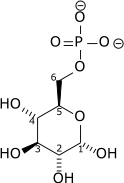
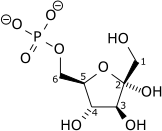
| α-D-Glucose 6-phosphate | Phosphoglucose isomerase | α-D-Fructose 6-phosphate |
| | Phosphoglucose isomerase |

Compound C00668 at KEGG Pathway Database. Enzyme 5.3.1.9 at KEGG Pathway Database. Compound C05345 at KEGG Pathway Database. Reaction R00771 at KEGG Pathway Database.

Glucose 6-phosphate binds to GPI in its pyranose form. The ring is opened in a "push-pull" mechanism by His388, which protonates the C5 oxygen, and Lys518, which deprotonates the C1 hydroxyl group. This creates an open chain aldose. Then, the substrate is rotated about the C3-C4 bond to position it for isomerization. At this point, Glu357 deprotonates C2 to create a cis-enediolate intermediate stabilized by Arg272. To complete the isomerization, Glu357 donates its proton to C1, the C2 hydroxyl group loses its proton and the open-chain ketose fructose 6-phosphate is formed. Finally, the ring is closed by rotating the substrate about the C3-C4 bond again and deprotonating the C5 hydroxyl with Lys518.

When going from fructose-6-phosphate toward glucose-6-phosphate, the result could be mannose-6-phosphate if carbon C2 is given the wrong chirality, but the enzyme does not permit that result except at a very low, non-physiological, rate.

== Function ==
This gene belongs to the GPI family. The protein encoded by this gene is a dimeric enzyme that catalyzes the reversible isomerization of G6P and F6P. Since the reaction is reversible, its direction is determined by G6P and F6P concentrations.

glucose 6-phosphate ⇌ fructose 6-phosphate

The protein has different functions inside and outside the cell. In the cytoplasm, the protein is involved in glycolysis and gluconeogenesis, as well as the pentose phosphate pathway. Outside the cell, it functions as a neurotrophic factor for spinal and sensory neurons, called neuroleukin. The same protein is also secreted by cancer cells, where it is called autocrine motility factor and stimulates metastasis. Extracellular GPI is also known to function as a maturation factor.

=== Neuroleukin ===
Though originally treated as separate proteins, cloning technology demonstrated that GPI is almost identical to the protein neuroleukin. Neuroleukin is a neurotrophic factor for spinal and sensory neurons. It is found in large amounts in muscle, brain, heart, and kidneys. Neuroleukin also acts as a lymphokine secreted by T cells stimulated by lectin. It induces immunoglobulin secretion in B cells as part of a response that activates antibody-secreting cells.

=== Autocrine motility factor ===
Cloning experiments also revealed that GPI is identical to the protein known as autocrine motility factor (AMF). AMF produced and secreted by cancer cells and stimulates cell growth and motility as a growth factor. AMF is thought to play a key role in cancer metastasis by activating the MAPK/ERK or PI3K/AKT pathways. In the PI3K/AKT pathway, AMF interacts with gp78/AMFR to regulate ER calcium release, and therefore protect against apoptosis in response to ER stress.

== Prokaryotic orthologs ==
In some archaea and bacteria glucose-6-phosphate isomerase activity occurs via a bifunctional enzyme that also exhibits phosphomannose isomerase (PMI) activity. Though not closely related to eukaryotic GPIs, the bifunctional enzyme is similar enough that the sequence includes the cluster of threonines and serines that forms the sugar phosphate-binding site in conventional GPI. The enzyme is thought to use the same catalytic mechanisms for both glucose ring-opening and isomerization for the interconversion of G6P to F6P.

== Clinical significance ==
A deficiency of GPI is responsible for 4% of the hemolytic anemias due to glycolytic enzyme deficiencies. Several cases of GPI deficiency have recently been identified.

Elevated serum GPI levels have been used as a prognostic biomarker for colorectal, breast, lung, kidney, gastrointestinal, and other cancers. As AMF, GPI is attributed with regulating cell migration during invasion and metastasis. One study showed that the external layers of breast tumor spheroids (BTS) secrete GPI, which induces epithelial–mesenchymal transition (EMT), invasion, and metastasis in BTS. The GPI inhibitors ERI4P and 6PG were found to block metastasis of BTS but not BTS glycolysis or fibroblast viability. In addition, GPI is secreted exclusively by tumor cells and not normal cells. For these reasons, GPI inhibitors may be a safer, more targeted approach for anti-cancer therapy. GPI also participates in a positive feedback loop with HER2, a major breast cancer therapeutic target, as GPI enhances HER2 expression and HER2 overexpression enhances GPI expression, and so on. As a result, GPI activity likely confers resistance in breast cancer cells against HER2-based therapies using Herceptin/Trastuzumab, and should be considered as an additional target when treating patients.

== Applications ==
Human GPI is capable of inducing arthritis in mice with varied genetic backgrounds via intradermal injection.

== See also ==
- Fructose-1-phosphate-aldolase enzyme, which converts fructose to glucose

== Interactions ==
GPI is known to interact with:

- AMFR, and
- HER2.

== Interactive pathway map ==
Click on genes, proteins and metabolites below to link to respective articles. (Note: The interactive pathway map can be edited at WikiPathways: "GlycolysisGluconeogenesis_WP534".)

Glycolysis and Gluconeogenesis edit
