= Essential fructosuria =

- Other names: Ketohexokinase deficiency
- Fructose
- Specialty: Medical genetics

Essential fructosuria, caused by a deficiency of the enzyme hepatic fructokinase, is a clinically benign condition characterized by the incomplete metabolism of fructose in the liver, leading to its excretion in urine. Fructokinase (sometimes called ketohexokinase) is the first enzyme involved in the degradation of fructose to fructose-1-phosphate in the liver.

This defective degradation does not cause any clinical symptoms, fructose is either excreted unchanged in the urine or metabolized to fructose-6-phosphate by alternate pathways in the body, most commonly by hexokinase in adipose tissue and muscle.

== Cause ==
Essential fructosuria is a genetic condition that is inherited in an autosomal recessive manner. Mutations in the KHK gene, located on chromosome 2p23.3-23.2 are responsible. The incidence of essential fructosuria has been estimated at 1:130,000. The actual incidence is likely higher, because those affected are asymptomatic.

== Diagnosis ==
A diagnosis of essential fructosuria is typically made after a positive routine test for reducing sugars in the urine. An additional test with glucose oxidase must also be carried out (with a negative result indicating essential fructosuria) as a positive test for reducing sugars is most often a result of glucosuria secondary to diabetes mellitus. The excretion of fructose in the urine is not constant, it depends largely on dietary intake.

== Treatment ==
No treatment is indicated for essential fructosuria, while the degree of fructosuria depends on the dietary fructose intake, it does not have any clinical manifestations. The amount of fructose routinely lost in urine is quite small. Other errors in fructose metabolism have greater clinical significance. Hereditary fructose intolerance, or the presence of fructose in the blood (fructosemia), is caused by a deficiency of aldolase B, the second enzyme involved in the metabolism of fructose.

This enzyme deficiency results in an accumulation of fructose-1-phosphate, which inhibits the production of glucose and results in diminished regeneration of adenosine triphosphate. Clinically, patients with hereditary fructose intolerance are much more severely affected than those with essential fructosuria, with elevated uric acid, growth abnormalities and can result in coma if untreated.
