= Ketohexokinase =

Class of enzymes

KHK
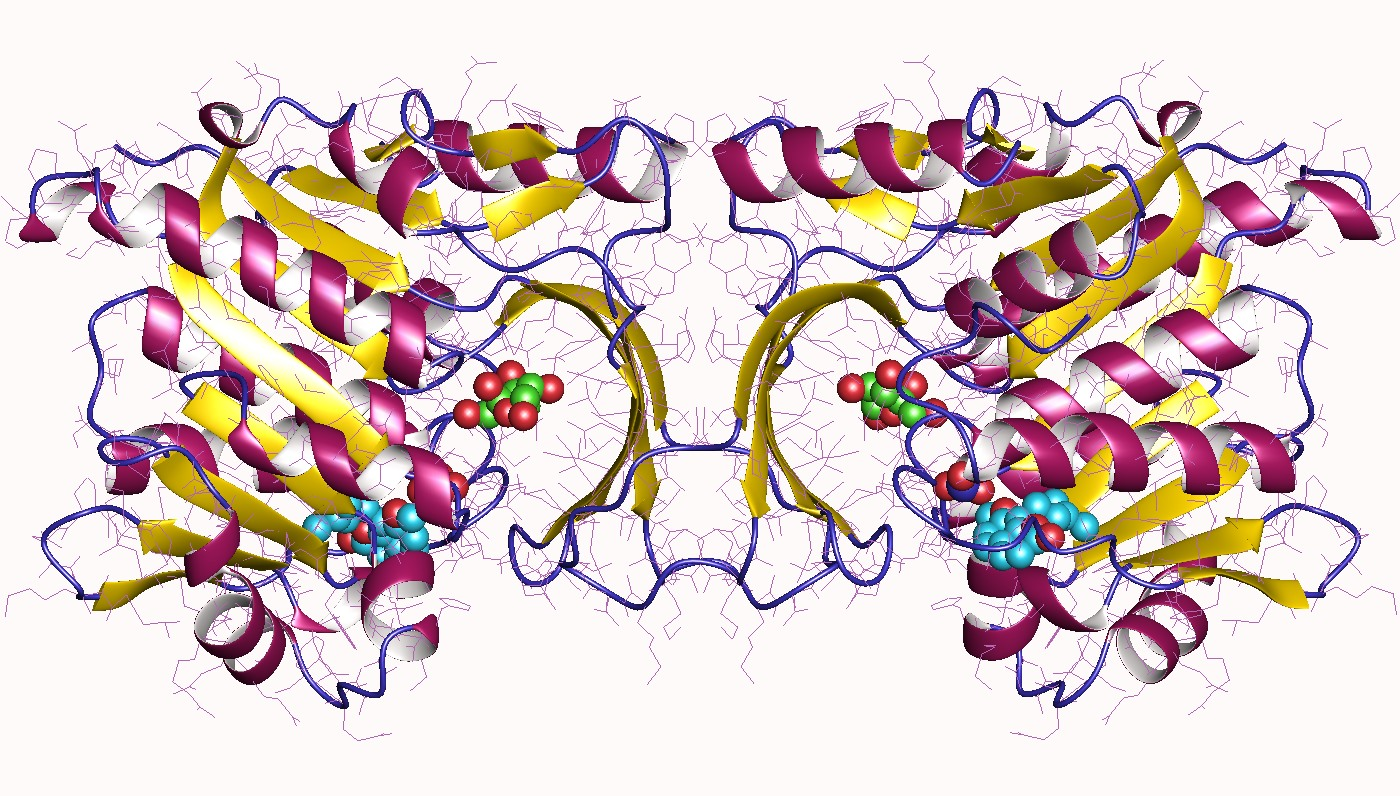
- Ketohexokinase homodimer, Human

Identifiers
- Aliases: KHK, ketohexokinase, FRUCTU, Hepatic fructokinase
- External IDs: OMIM: 614058; MGI: 1096353; GeneCards: KHK
Available structures
PDB	Ortholog search: PDBe RCSB
PDB	List of PDB id codes 2HLZ, 2HQQ, 2HW1, 3B3L, 3NBV, 3NBW, 3NC2, 3NC9, 3NCA, 3Q92, 3QA2, 3QAI, 3RO4
Enzyme activity
EC #	BRENDA	ExPASy	KEGG	MetaCyc
2.7.1.3	↗	↗	↗	↗

Gene location (Human)
Chr.	Chromosome 2 (human)
Band	2p23.3	Start	27,086,747 bp
Band	2p23.3	End	27,100,762 bp

Gene location (Mouse)
Chr.	Chromosome 5 (mouse)
Band	5 B1|5 16.9 cM	Start	31,078,775 bp
Band	5 B1|5 16.9 cM	End	31,088,592 bp
RNA expression pattern
Bgee	Human / Mouse (ortholog); Top expressed in: right lobe of liver; mucosa of ileum; human kidney; jejunal mucosa; duodenum; kidney tubule; glomerulus; metanephric glomerulus; testicle; mucosa of transverse colon / Top expressed in: right kidney; human kidney; left lobe of liver; duodenum; jejunum; proximal tubule; intestinal villus; muscle of thigh; granulocyte; lumbar spinal ganglion; More reference expression data
BioGPS	n/a
Gene ontology
Molecular function	transferase activity; nucleotide binding; kinase activity; protein binding; ketohexokinase activity; ATP binding; carbohydrate kinase activity
Cellular component	cytoplasm; cytosol; extracellular exosome
Biological process	response to fructose; phosphorylation; fructose catabolic process to hydroxyacetone phosphate and glyceraldehyde-3-phosphate; response to zinc ion; response to glucose; response to insulin; response to sucrose; fructose metabolic process; carbohydrate phosphorylation; carbohydrate metabolic process; regulation of glycogen metabolic process
Sources:Amigo / QuickGO
Orthologs
Databases	NCBI: entry; OMA: entry
Species	Human	Mouse
Entrez	3795	16548
Ensembl	ENSG00000138030	ENSMUSG00000029162
UniProt	P50053	P97328
RefSeq (mRNA)	NM_000221; NM_006488	NM_008439; NM_001310524; NM_001310525; NM_001349066
RefSeq (protein)	NP_000212; NP_006479	NP_001297453; NP_001297454; NP_032465; NP_001335995
Location (UCSC)	Chr 2: 27.09 – 27.1 Mb	Chr 5: 31.08 – 31.09 Mb
PubMed search
- Wikidata
View/Edit Human	View/Edit Mouse

Ketohexokinase

Identifiers
- EC no.: 2.7.1.3
- CAS no.: 9030-50-6

Databases
- BRENDA: enzyme data
- ExPASy: NiceZyme view
- KEGG: enzyme entry
- MetaCyc: metabolic pathway
- Rhea: reactions
- PDB structures: RCSB PDB PDBe PDBsum
Search
- PMC: articles
- PubMed: articles
- NCBI: proteins

Ketohexokinase (or hepatic fructokinase) is an enzyme that catalyzes the phosphorylation of fructose to produce fructose-1-phosphate.

ATP + $\longrightarrow$ ADP +
ATP + D-fructose → ADP + D-fructose-1-phosphate

== Isoforms ==
In humans, ketohexokinase is encoded by the KHK gene, which produces two isoforms, KHK-A and KHK-C, through alternative splicing.

- KHK-C is primarily expressed in the liver, kidney, and intestine. It has a high affinity for fructose (low K_{m}) and is responsible for the majority of fructose metabolism.
- KHK-A is ubiquitously expressed in many tissues at low levels. It has a significantly lower affinity for fructose (high K_{m}) compared to the C isoform.

== Role in fructose metabolism ==
Ketohexokinase catalyzes the first step of fructolysis by phosphorylating fructose to form fructose 1-phosphate. The resulting fructose 1-phosphate is subsequently cleaved by aldolase B, producing intermediates that enter central carbohydrate metabolism.

In humans, the KHK-C isoform is responsible for most fructose metabolism in the liver, kidney, and intestine. Unlike glucose metabolism, fructose metabolism through ketohexokinase bypasses phosphofructokinase, a major regulatory step in glycolysis, allowing fructose to enter downstream metabolic pathways through fructolysis.

KHK is not allosterically inhibited by ATP or by its immediate product, fructose 1-phosphate.

== Essential fructosuria ==
Loss-of-function mutations in KHK cause essential fructosuria, a generally benign inherited condition. After consuming fructose, affected people can have increased circulating fructose and excrete a portion of the fructose in urine.
