= MPI-CDG =

- Other names: CDG-IB
- Specialty: Medical genetics
- Treatment: mannose supplementation

MPI-CDG is an autosomal recessive congenital disorder of glycosylation caused by biallelic pathogenic variants in MPI. The clinical symptoms in MPI-CDG are caused by deficient activity of the enzyme mannose phosphate isomerase. Clinically, the most common symptoms of MPI-CDG are chronic diarrhea, failure to thrive, protein-losing enteropathy, and coagulopathy. MPI-CDG differs from most other described glycosylation disorders due to its lack of central nervous system involvement, and because it has treatment options besides supportive care. Treatment with oral mannose has been shown to improve most symptoms of the disease. If left untreated, MPI-CDG can be fatal. MPI-CDG was previously known as CDG-IB. The disorder was first described clinically in 1986, and the underlying genetic defect was identified in 1998.
