= Fructose 6-phosphate =

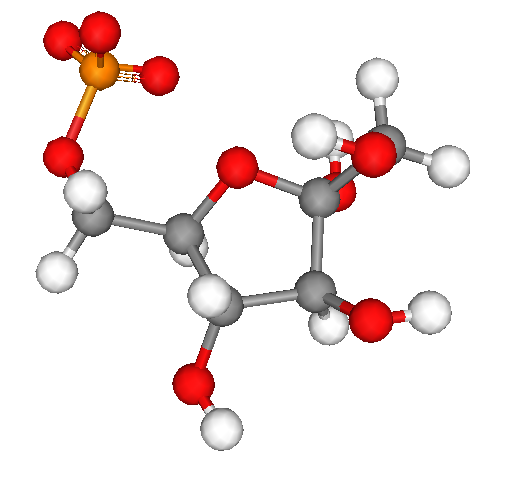

Names
- IUPAC name 6-O-Phosphono-α-D-fructofuranose
- Other names β-D-fructose 6-phosphate, fructose 6-phosphate

Identifiers
CAS Number	643-13-0
3D model (JSmol)	Interactive image
Abbreviations	F6P
ChEBI	CHEBI:16084
ChemSpider	392657
ECHA InfoCard	100.010.360
KEGG	C00085
PubChem CID	440641
UNII	2012QM764Y
CompTox Dashboard (EPA)	DTXSID80904350
- InChI: InChI=1S/C6H13O9P/c7-2-6(10)5(9)4(8)3(15-6)1-14-16(11,12)13/h3-5,7-10H,1-2H2,(H2,11,12,13)/t3-,4-,5+,6+/m1/s1 Key: BGWGXPAPYGQALX-ZXXMMSQZSA-N; InChI=1/C6H13O9P/c7-2-6(10)5(9)4(8)3(15-6)1-14-16(11,12)13/h3-5,7-10H,1-2H2,(H2,11,12,13)/t3-,4-,5+,6+/m1/s1 Key: BGWGXPAPYGQALX-ZXXMMSQZBI
- SMILES: O=P(O)(O)OC[C@H]1O[C@@](O)(CO)[C@@H](O)[C@@H]1O

Properties
Chemical formula	C_{6}H_{13}O_{9}P
Molar mass	260.14 g/mol
- Except where otherwise noted, data are given for materials in their standard state (at 25 °C [77 °F], 100 kPa). verify (what is ?) Infobox references

Fructose 6-phosphate (sometimes called the Neuberg ester) is a derivative of fructose, which has been phosphorylated at the 6-hydroxy group. It is one of several possible fructosephosphates. The β-D-form of this compound is very common in cells. The great majority of glucose is converted to fructose 6-phosphate upon entering a cell. Fructose is predominantly converted to fructose 1-phosphate by fructokinase following cellular import.

== History ==
The name Neuberg ester comes from the German biochemist Carl Neuberg. In 1918, he found that the compound (later identified as fructose 6-phosphate) was produced by mild acid hydrolysis of fructose 2,6-bisphosphate.

== In glycolysis ==
Fructose 6-phosphate lies within the glycolysis metabolic pathway and is produced by isomerisation of glucose 6-phosphate. It is in turn further phosphorylated to fructose-1,6-bisphosphate.

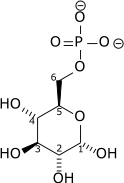
α-D-glucose 6-phosphate	Phosphoglucose isomerase	β-D-fructose 6-phosphate	Phosphofructokinase-1		β-D-fructose 1,6-bisphosphate
			ATP	ADP
			P_{i}	H_{2}O
	Phosphoglucose isomerase		Fructose bisphosphatase

Compound C00668 at KEGG Pathway Database. Enzyme 5.3.1.9 at KEGG Pathway Database. Compound C05345 at KEGG Pathway Database. Enzyme 2.7.1.11 at KEGG Pathway Database. Enzyme 3.1.3.11 at KEGG Pathway Database. Reaction at KEGG Pathway Database. Compound C05378 at KEGG Pathway Database.

Click on genes, proteins and metabolites below to link to respective articles. (Note: The interactive pathway map can be edited at WikiPathways: "GlycolysisGluconeogenesis_WP534".)

Glycolysis and Gluconeogenesis edit

== See also ==
- Mannose phosphate isomerase
