= Hereditary fructose intolerance =

Fructose intolerance
- Other names: HFI
- Fructose
- Specialty: Endocrinology
- Frequency: 0.005%

Hereditary fructose intolerance (HFI) is an inborn error of fructose metabolism caused by a deficiency of the enzyme aldolase B. Individuals affected with HFI are asymptomatic until they ingest fructose, sucrose, or sorbitol. If fructose is ingested, the enzymatic block at aldolase B causes an accumulation of fructose-1-phosphate which, over time, results in the death of liver cells. This accumulation has downstream effects on gluconeogenesis and regeneration of adenosine triphosphate (ATP). Symptoms of HFI include vomiting, convulsions, irritability, poor feeding as a baby, hypoglycemia, jaundice, hemorrhage, hepatomegaly, hyperuricemia and potentially kidney failure. There are reported deaths in infants and children as a result of the metabolic consequences of HFI. Death in HFI is always associated with problems in diagnosis.

HFI is an autosomal recessive condition caused by mutations in the ALDOB gene, located at 9q31.1. HFI is typically suspected based on dietary history, especially in infants who become symptomatic after breast feeding. This suspicion is typically confirmed by molecular analysis Treatment of HFI involves strict avoidance of fructose in the diet. Older patients with HFI typically self-select a diet low in fructose, even before being diagnosed.

The discovery of hereditary fructose intolerance (HFI) as a clinical entity is credited to Chambers and Pratt, who first described the condition in 1956. They identified it in a 24-year-old woman who experienced nausea and abdominal pain specifically after consuming fruit or sugar, describing it at the time as an "...idiosyncrasy to fructose".

== Presentation ==
The key identifying feature of HFI is the appearance of symptoms with the introduction of fructose to the diet. Affected individuals are asymptomatic and healthy, provided they do not ingest foods containing fructose or any of its common precursors, sucrose and sorbitol. In the past, infants often became symptomatic when they were introduced to formulas that were sweetened with fructose or sucrose. These sweeteners are not common in formulas used today. Symptoms such as vomiting, nausea, restlessness, pallor, sweating, trembling and lethargy can also first present in infants when they are introduced to fruits and vegetables. These can progress to apathy, coma and convulsions if the source is not recognized early.

When patients are diagnosed with HFI, a dietary history will often reveal an aversion to fruit and other foods that contain large amounts of fructose. Most adult patients do not have any dental caries.

== Fructose metabolism ==
After ingestion, fructose is converted to fructose-1-phosphate in the liver by fructokinase. Deficiencies of fructokinase cause essential fructosuria, a clinically benign condition characterized by the excretion of unmetabolized fructose in the urine. Fructose-1-phosphate is metabolized by aldolase B into dihydroxyacetone phosphate and glyceraldehyde. HFI is caused by a deficiency of aldolase B.

A deficiency of aldolase B results in an accumulation of fructose-1-phosphate, and trapping of phosphate (fructokinase requires adenosine triphosphate (ATP)). The downstream effects of this enzyme block are the inhibition of glucose production and reduced regeneration of ATP.

== Diagnosis ==
Because of the ease of therapy (dietary exclusion of fructose), HFI can be effectively managed if properly diagnosed. In HFI, the diagnosis of homozygotes is difficult, requiring a genomic DNA screening with allele-specific probes or an enzyme assay from a liver biopsy. Once identified, parents of infants who carry mutant aldolase B alleles leading to HFI, or older individuals who have clinical histories compatible with HFI can be identified and counselled with regard to preventive therapy: dietary exclusion of foods containing fructose, sucrose, or sorbitol. If possible, individuals who suspect they might have HFI should avoid testing via fructose challenge as the results are non-conclusive for individuals with HFI, and even if the diagnostic administration of fructose is properly controlled, profound hypoglycemia and its sequelae can threaten the patient's well-being.

== Treatment ==
Treatment of HFI depends on the stage of the disease, and the severity of the symptoms. Stable patients without acute intoxication events are treated by careful dietary planning that avoids fructose and its metabolic precursors. Fructose is replaced in the diet by glucose, maltose or other sugars. Management of patients with HFI often involves dietitians who have a thorough knowledge of what foods are acceptable.

== Scythian mutation ==
Genetic analysis of ancient Don Scythians found an ALDOB gene pathogenic variant named p.Ala150Pro or rs1800546. Those people's diet was mostly meat, dairy, and C4 plants with no fruits. Their skeletons showed no indications of tooth decay. That variant spread through Europe to be by far the main cause of hereditary fructose intolerance.

== See also ==
- Fructose malabsorption
