= Aldolase B =

Mammalian protein found in Homo sapiens

ALDOB

Identifiers
- Aliases: ALDOB, Aldob, Aldo-2, Aldo2, BC016435, ALDB, aldolase, fructose-bisphosphate B
- External IDs: OMIM: 612724; MGI: 87995; GeneCards: ALDOB
Available structures
PDB	Ortholog search: PDBe RCSB
PDB	List of PDB id codes 1QO5, 1XDL, 1XDM
Enzyme activity
EC #	BRENDA	ExPASy	KEGG	MetaCyc
4.1.2.13	↗	↗	↗	↗

Gene location (Human)
Chr.	Chromosome 9 (human)
Band	9q31.1	Start	101,420,560 bp
Band	9q31.1	End	101,449,664 bp

Gene location (Mouse)
Chr.	Chromosome 4 (mouse)
Band	4 B1|4 26.57 cM	Start	49,535,995 bp
Band	4 B1|4 26.57 cM	End	49,549,546 bp
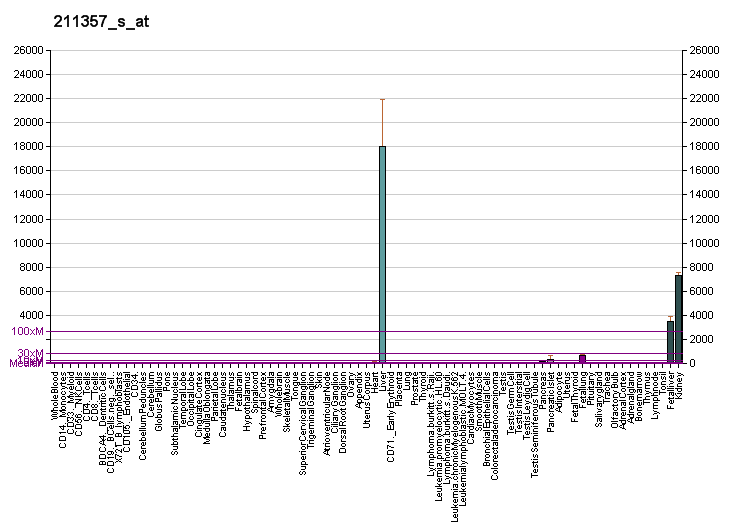

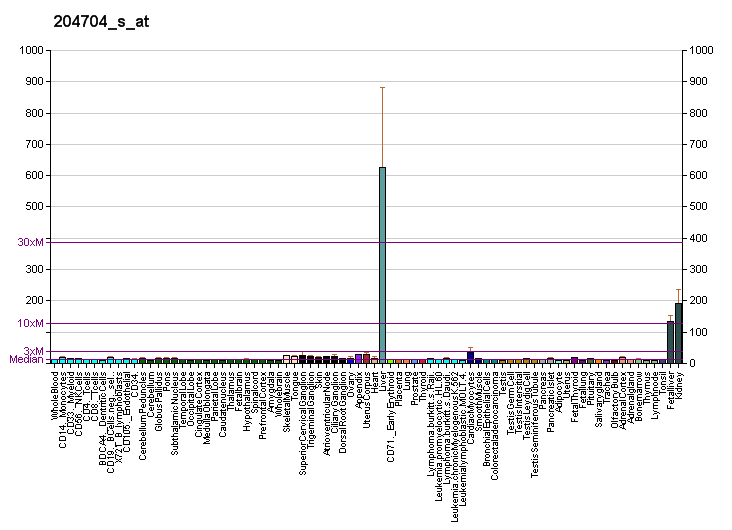

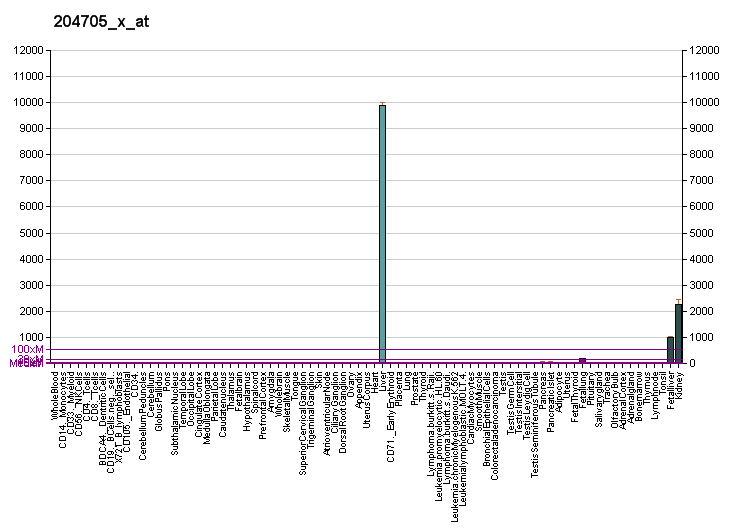
RNA expression pattern
Bgee	Human / Mouse (ortholog); Top expressed in: jejunal mucosa; kidney tubule; right lobe of liver; renal medulla; glomerulus; metanephric glomerulus; duodenum; gallbladder; body of pancreas; human kidney / Top expressed in: right kidney; human kidney; left lobe of liver; jejunum; proximal tubule; duodenum; ileum; migratory enteric neural crest cell; epithelium of small intestine; intestinal villus; More reference expression data
BioGPS	More reference expression data
Gene ontology
Molecular function	fructose-1-phosphate aldolase activity; ATPase binding; cytoskeletal protein binding; fructose binding; protein binding; catalytic activity; lyase activity; identical protein binding; fructose-bisphosphate aldolase activity
Cellular component	cytoplasm; centriolar satellite; microtubule organizing center; extracellular exosome; cytoskeleton; cytosol
Biological process	gluconeogenesis; positive regulation of ATP-dependent activity; glycolytic process; vacuolar proton-transporting V-type ATPase complex assembly; canonical glycolysis; fructose catabolic process to hydroxyacetone phosphate and glyceraldehyde-3-phosphate; fructose 1,6-bisphosphate metabolic process; NADH oxidation; fructose metabolic process
Sources:Amigo / QuickGO
Orthologs
Databases	NCBI: entry; OMA: entry
Species	Human	Mouse
Entrez	229	230163
Ensembl	ENSG00000136872	ENSMUSG00000028307
UniProt	P05062	Q91Y97
RefSeq (mRNA)	NM_000035	NM_144903
RefSeq (protein)	NP_000026	NP_659152
Location (UCSC)	Chr 9: 101.42 – 101.45 Mb	Chr 4: 49.54 – 49.55 Mb
PubMed search
- Wikidata
View/Edit Human	View/Edit Mouse

Aldolase B also known as fructose-bisphosphate aldolase B or liver-type aldolase is one of three isoenzymes (A, B, and C) of the class I fructose 1,6-bisphosphate aldolase enzyme (EC 4.1.2.13), and plays a key role in both glycolysis and gluconeogenesis. The generic fructose 1,6-bisphosphate aldolase enzyme catalyzes the reversible cleavage of fructose 1,6-bisphosphate (FBP) into glyceraldehyde 3-phosphate and dihydroxyacetone phosphate (DHAP) as well as the reversible cleavage of fructose 1-phosphate (F1P) into glyceraldehyde and dihydroxyacetone phosphate. In mammals, aldolase B is preferentially expressed in the liver, while aldolase A is expressed in muscle and erythrocytes and aldolase C is expressed in the brain. Slight differences in isozyme structure result in different activities for the two substrate molecules: FBP and fructose 1-phosphate. Aldolase B exhibits no preference and thus catalyzes both reactions, while aldolases A and C prefer FBP.

In humans, aldolase B is encoded by the ALDOB gene located on chromosome 9. The gene is 14,500 base pairs long and contains 9 exons. Defects in this gene have been identified as the cause of hereditary fructose intolerance (HFI).

== Mechanism ==
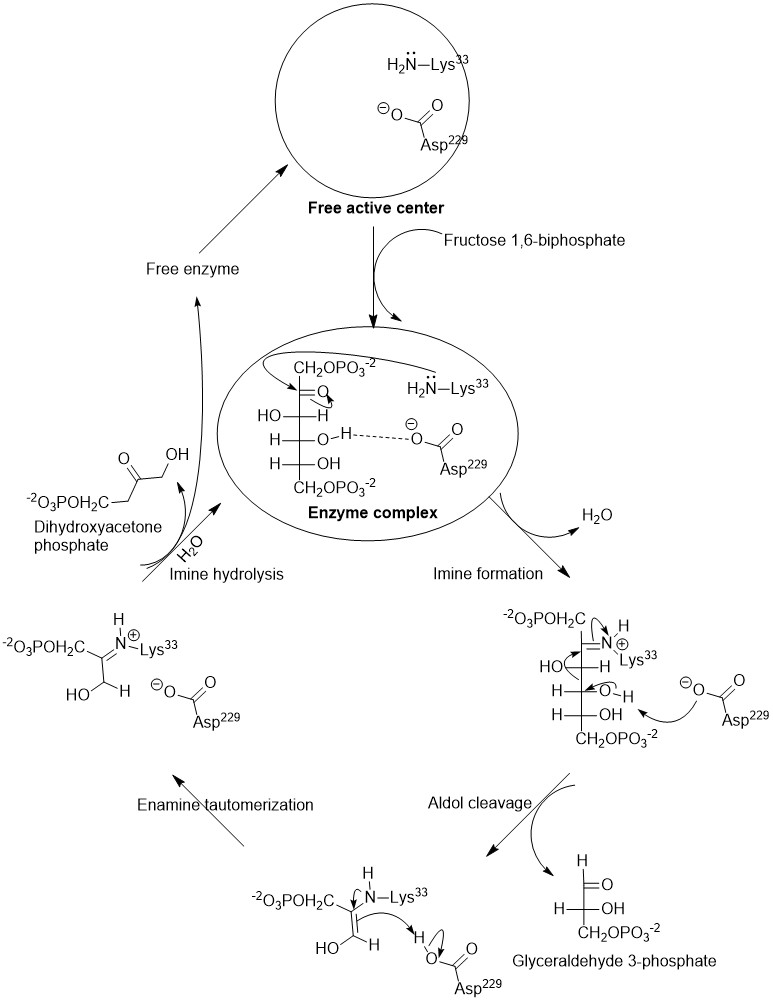
The aldol cleavage of fructose 1,6-bisphosphate by aldolase b demonstrates the different reaction products, dihydroxyacetone phosphate and glyceraldehyde 3-phosphate.

The generic fructose bisphosphate aldolase enzyme cleaves a 6-carbon fructose sugar into two 3-carbon products in a reverse aldol reaction. This reaction is typified by the formation of a Schiff base intermediate with a lysine residue (lysine 229) in the active site of the enzyme; the formation of a Schiff base is the key differentiator between Class I (produced by animals) and Class II (produced by fungi and bacteria) aldolases. After Schiff base formation, the fourth hydroxyl group on the fructose backbone is then deprotonated by an aspartate residue (aspartate 33), which results in an aldol cleavage. Schiff base hydrolysis yields two 3-carbon products. Depending on the reactant, F1P or FBP, the products are DHAP and glyceraldehyde or glyceraldehyde 3-phosphate, respectively.

The ΔG°’ of this reaction is +23.9 kJ/mol. Though the reaction may seem too uphill to occur, it is of note that under physiological conditions, the ΔG of the reaction falls to close to or below zero. For example, the ΔG of this reaction under physiological conditions in erythrocytes is -0.23 kJ/mol.

== Structure ==
Aldolase B is a homotetrameric enzyme, composed of four subunits with molecular weights of 36 kDa with local 222 symmetry. Each subunit has a molecular weight of 36 kDa and contains an eight-stranded α/β barrel, which encloses lysine 229 (the Schiff-base forming amino acid that is key for catalysis).

=== Isozyme specific regions ===
Though the majority of the overall structure of the aldolase enzyme is conserved amongst the three isozymes, four regions of the generic aldolase enzyme have been identified to be highly variable among isozymes. Such regions have been denoted isozyme-specific regions (ISR1-4). These regions are thought to give isozymes their specificities and structural differences. ISRs 1-3 are all found in exon 3 of the ALDOB gene. ISR 4 is the most variable of the four and is found at the c-terminal end of the protein.

ISRs 1-3 are found predominantly in patches on the surface of the enzyme. These patches do not overlap with the active site, indicating that ISRs may change specific isozyme substrate specificity from a distance or cause the C-terminus interactions with the active site. A recent theory suggests that ISRs may allow for different conformational dynamics in the aldolase enzyme that account for its specificity.

== Physiology ==
Aldolase B plays a key role in carbohydrate metabolism as it catalyzes one of the major steps of the glycolytic-gluconeogenic pathway. Though it does catalyze the breakdown of glucose, it plays a particularly important role in fructose metabolism, which occurs mostly in the liver, renal cortex, and small intestinal mucosa. When fructose is absorbed, it is phosphorylated by fructokinase to form fructose 1-phosphate. Aldolase B then catalyzes F1P breakdown into glyceraldehyde and DHAP. After glyceraldehyde is phosphorylated by triose kinase to form G3P, both products can be used in the glycolytic-gluconeogenic pathway, that is, they can be modified to become either glucose or pyruvate.

Though the mechanism aldolase B regulation is unknown, increased ALDOB gene transcription in animal livers has been noticed with an increase in dietary carbohydrates and decrease in glucagon concentration.

=== Interactive pathway map ===
Click on genes, proteins and metabolites below to link to respective articles. (Note: The interactive pathway map can be edited at WikiPathways: "GlycolysisGluconeogenesis_WP534".)

Glycolysis and Gluconeogenesis edit

== Pathology ==
Genetic mutations leading to defects in aldolase B result in a condition called hereditary fructose intolerance. Due to the lack of functional aldolase B, organisms with HFI cannot properly process F1P, which leads to an accumulation of F1P in bodily tissues. In addition to being toxic to cellular tissues, high levels of F1P traps phosphate in an unusable form that does not return to the general phosphate pool, resulting in depletion of both phosphate and ATP stores. The lack of readily available phosphate causes the cessation of glycogenolysis in the liver, which results in hypoglycemia. This accumulation also inhibits gluconeogenesis, further reducing the amount of readily available glucose. The loss of ATP leads to a multitude of problems including inhibition of protein synthesis and hepatic and renal dysfunction. Patient prognosis, however, is good in cases of hereditary fructose intolerance. By avoiding foods containing fructose, sucrose, and sorbitol, patients can live symptom-free lives.

HFI is recessively inherited autosomal disorder. Approximately 30 mutations that cause HFI have been identified, and these combined mutations result in a HFI frequency of 1 in every 20,000 births. Mutant alleles are a result of a number different types of mutations including base pair substitutions and small deletions. The most common mutation is A149P, which is a guanine to cytosine transversion in exon 5, resulting in the replacement of alanine at position 149 with proline. This specific mutant allele is estimated to account for 53% of HFI alleles. Other mutations resulting in HFI are less frequent and often correlated with ancestral origins.
