= Mannose phosphate isomerase =

Class of enzymes

Mannose-6 phosphate isomerase
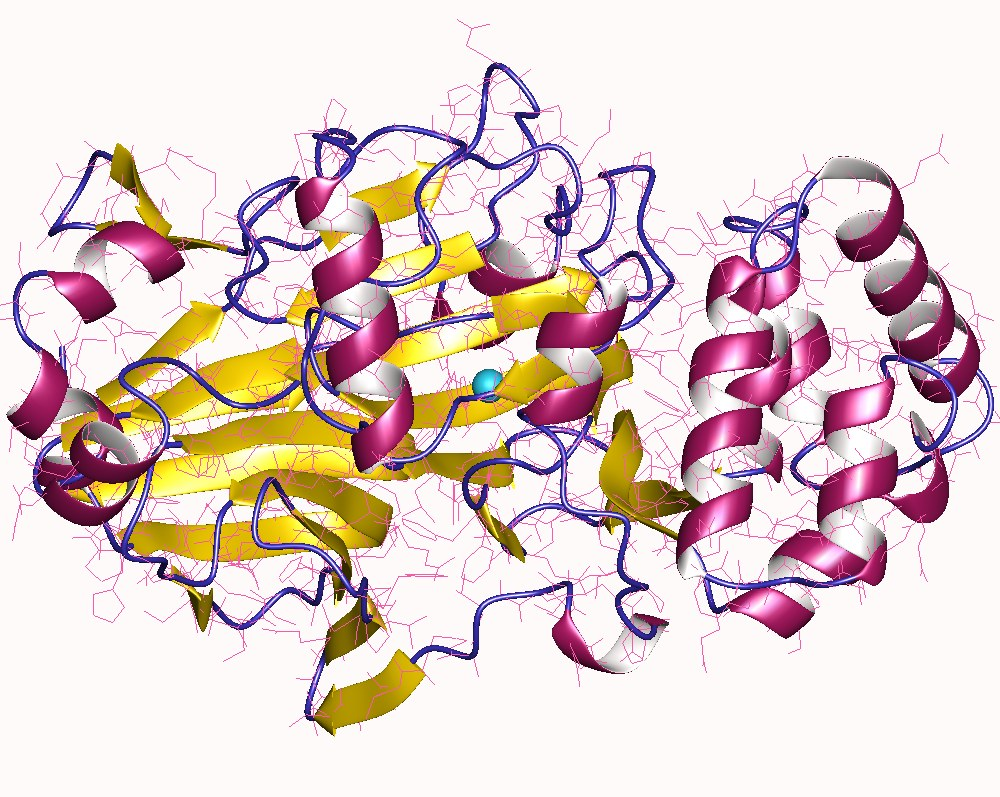

Identifiers
- EC no.: 5.3.1.8
- CAS no.: 9023-88-5

Databases
- BRENDA: enzyme data
- ExPASy: NiceZyme view
- KEGG: enzyme entry
- MetaCyc: metabolic pathway
- Rhea: reactions
- PDB structures: RCSB PDB PDBe PDBsum
Search
- PMC: articles
- PubMed: articles
- NCBI: proteins

MPI

Identifiers
- Aliases: MPI, CDG1B, PMI, PMI1, mannose phosphate isomerase
- External IDs: OMIM: 154550; MGI: 97075; GeneCards: MPI
Enzyme activity
EC #	BRENDA	ExPASy	KEGG	MetaCyc
5.3.1.8	↗	↗	↗	↗

Gene location (Human)
Chr.	Chromosome 15 (human)
Band	15q24.1-q24.2	Start	74,890,005 bp
Band	15q24.1-q24.2	End	74,902,219 bp

Gene location (Mouse)
Chr.	Chromosome 9 (mouse)
Band	9 B|9 31.05 cM	Start	57,451,539 bp
Band	9 B|9 31.05 cM	End	57,460,046 bp
RNA expression pattern
Bgee	Human / Mouse (ortholog); Top expressed in: apex of heart; mucosa of transverse colon; right adrenal gland; right adrenal cortex; left adrenal gland; left adrenal cortex; muscle of thigh; prefrontal cortex; right frontal lobe; cingulate gyrus / Top expressed in: spermatocyte; interventricular septum; spermatid; seminiferous tubule; right ventricle; muscle of thigh; cardiac muscles; intestinal villus; myocardium of ventricle; soleus muscle; More reference expression data
BioGPS	n/a
Gene ontology
Molecular function	zinc ion binding; metal ion binding; isomerase activity; mannose-6-phosphate isomerase activity
Cellular component	cytosol; extracellular exosome; cytoplasm
Biological process	mannose to fructose-6-phosphate metabolic process; cell wall mannoprotein biosynthetic process; protein glycosylation; GDP-mannose biosynthetic process; carbohydrate metabolic process
Sources:Amigo / QuickGO
Orthologs
Databases	NCBI: entry; OMA: entry
Species	Human	Mouse
Entrez	4351	110119
Ensembl	ENSG00000178802	ENSMUSG00000032306
UniProt	P34949	Q924M7
RefSeq (mRNA)	NM_001289155; NM_001289156; NM_001289157; NM_002435; NM_001330372	NM_025837
RefSeq (protein)	NP_001276084; NP_001276085; NP_001276086; NP_001317301; NP_002426	NP_080113
Location (UCSC)	Chr 15: 74.89 – 74.9 Mb	Chr 9: 57.45 – 57.46 Mb
PubMed search
- Wikidata
View/Edit Human	View/Edit Mouse

Mannose-6 phosphate isomerase (MPI), alternately phosphomannose isomerase (PMI) (EC 5.3.1.8) is an enzyme which facilitates the interconversion of fructose 6-phosphate (F6P) and mannose-6-phosphate (M6P). Mannose-6-phosphate isomerase may also enable the synthesis of GDP-mannose in eukaryotic organisms. M6P can be converted to F6P by mannose-6-phosphate isomerase and subsequently utilized in several metabolic pathways including glycolysis and capsular polysaccharide biosynthesis. PMI is monomeric and metallodependent on zinc as a cofactor ligand. PMI is inhibited by erythrose 4-phosphate, mannitol 1-phosphate, and to a lesser extent, the alpha anomer of M6P.

== Mechanism ==
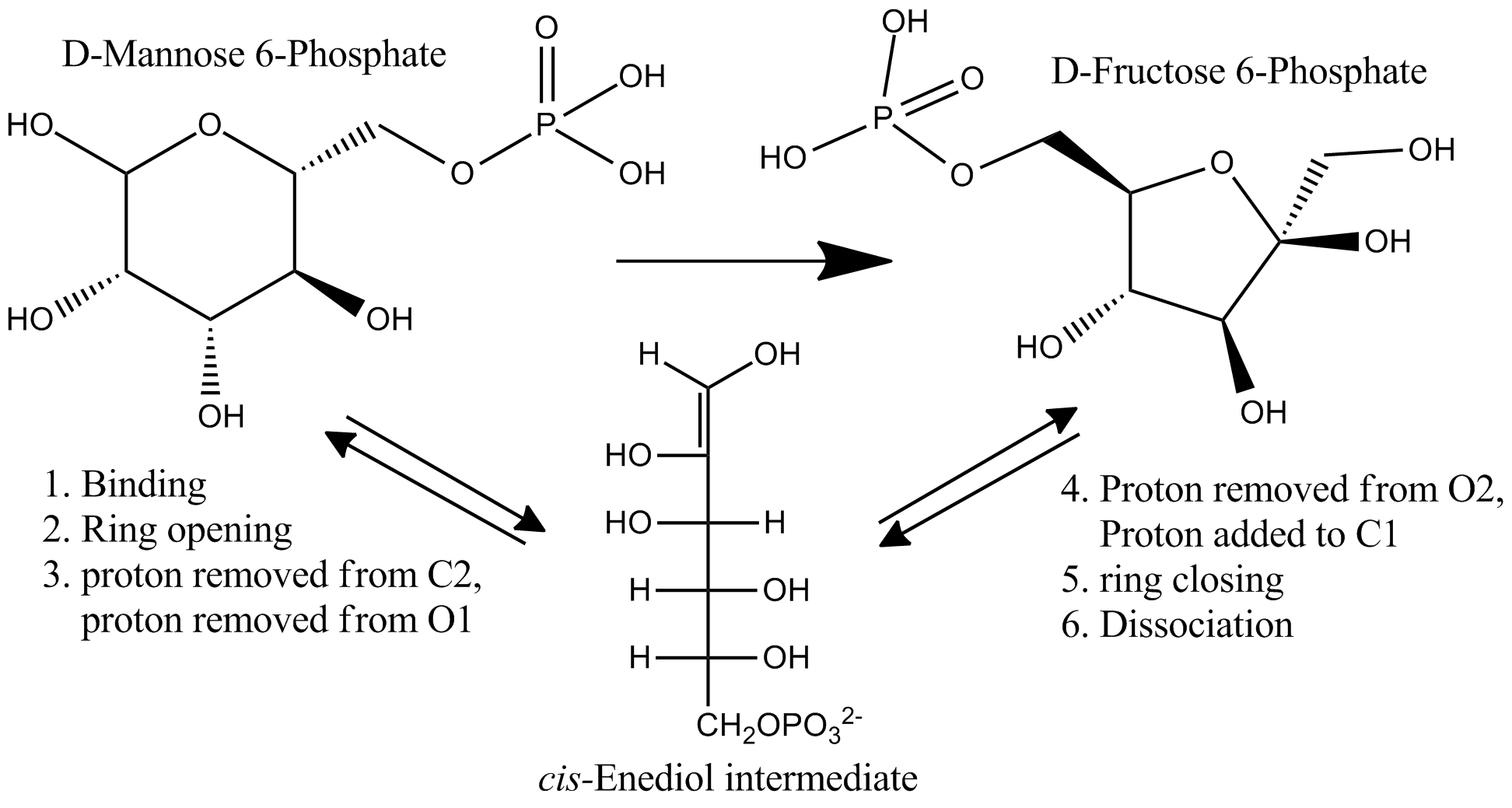
Rough mechanism showing cis-enediol intermediate

MPI must convert an aldose (mannose) to a ketose (fructose), in addition to opening and closing the rings for these sugars. In humans a mechanism has been suggested which involves a hydrogen transfer between C1 and C2, mediated by Tyr278, and the movement of a proton from O1 and O2 mediated by the associated Zn^{2+} ion. The ring opening step may be catalyzed by His99 and Asp270, and isomerization is likely a cis-enediol mechanism.

PMI shows a high degree of selectivity for the beta anomer of M6P, and the alpha anomer has no activity, and may in fact act as an inhibitor. Phosphoglucose isomerase (PGI) has a very similar function to PMI, (as it catalyzes the interconversion of glucose 6-phosphate and F6P) however PGI can anomerize alpha and beta G6P, and may also catalyze the conversion of alpha M6P to beta M6P, while PMI may not anomerize M6P. It is likely the cis-enediol intermediate formed by PMI is the same intermediate formed by PGI.

== Structure ==
MPI is composed of 440 amino acid residues, with one active site and one zinc ion (Zn^{2+}) ligand. Amino acids GLN 111A, HIS 113A, GLU 138A, HIS 285A, and HOH 798A are involved with the zinc ligand bonding. Structure differs from phosphoglucose isomerase by a threonine residue (Thr291) which creates extra space in the active site of PMI to accommodate the different stereochemistry of M6P. This increased space created by the threonine allows the rotation of the C2-C3 bond, which enables the necessary cis-enediol intermediate to be formed. Because mannose and glucose are stereoisomers at C2, which is crucial to the mechanism for both enzymes, PMI must allow extra space in the active site to allow for rotation of mannose to form the cis-enediol intermediate, which is the same intermediate formed by phosphoglucose isomerase.

== Biological relevance ==
PMI has several contributions to necessary metabolic pathways. It enables cells to transform M6P into F6P, which can then be entered into Glycolysis. PMI also allows cells to convert F6P into M6P, which is a common glycolytic cellular identifier for cellular transport and cell membrane identification in prokaryotic and eukaryotic organisms.

== Medical relevance ==
PMI may be helpful in the development of new antifungal treatments, as lack of PMI activity in yeast cells can lead to cell lysis and the enzyme may be a target for inhibition. This may be due to the role of PMI in the formation cell walls and capsular polysaccharide biosynthesis. Additionally M6P is an important signaling molecule, especially for transport to lysosomes: disorders affecting MPI activity may affect cellular ability to quickly produce M6P from plentiful F6P, and therefore vesicle traffic to lysosomes and endosomes may be altered, potentially negatively impacting the cell.

== See also ==
- Congenital disorder of glycosylation
- MPI-CDG
