= AMFR =

Protein-coding gene in the species Homo sapiens

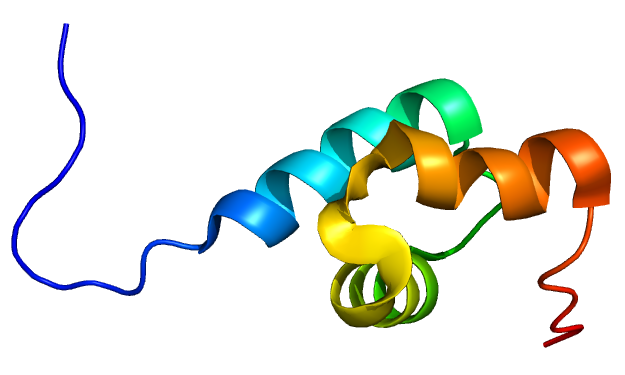

Identifiers
- Aliases: AMFR, GP78, RNF45, autocrine motility factor receptor
- External IDs: OMIM: 603243; MGI: 1345634; GeneCards: AMFR
Available structures
| PDB | Ortholog search: PDBe RCSB |
| PDB | List of PDB id codes 2EJS, 2LVN, 2LVO, 2LVP, 2LVQ, 2LXH, 2LXP, 3FSH, 3H8K, 3TIW, 4G3O, 4LAD |
Enzyme activity
| EC # | BRENDA | ExPASy | KEGG | MetaCyc |
|---|---|---|---|---|
| 2.3.2.36 | ↗ | ↗ | ↗ | ↗ |

Gene location (Human)
| Chr. | Chromosome 16 (human) |
| Band | 16q13 | Start | 56,361,452 bp |
| Band | 16q13 | End | 56,425,545 bp |

Gene location (Mouse)
| Chr. | Chromosome 8 (mouse) |
| Band | 8 C5|8 45.96 cM | Start | 94,698,216 bp |
| Band | 8 C5|8 45.96 cM | End | 94,739,470 bp |
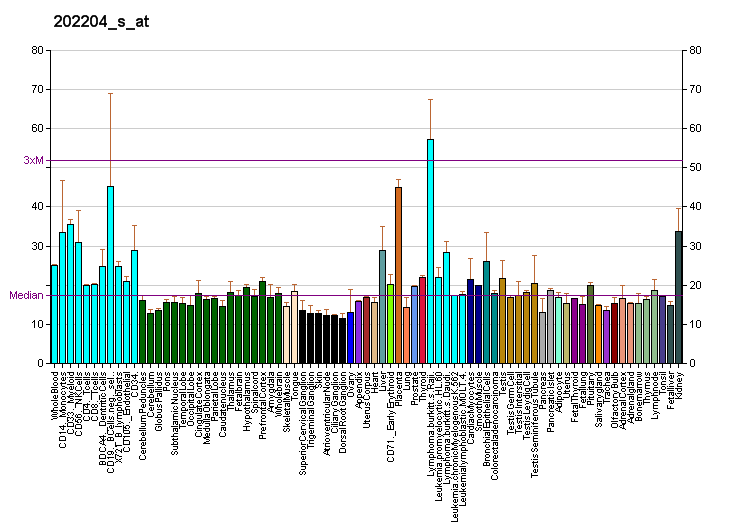

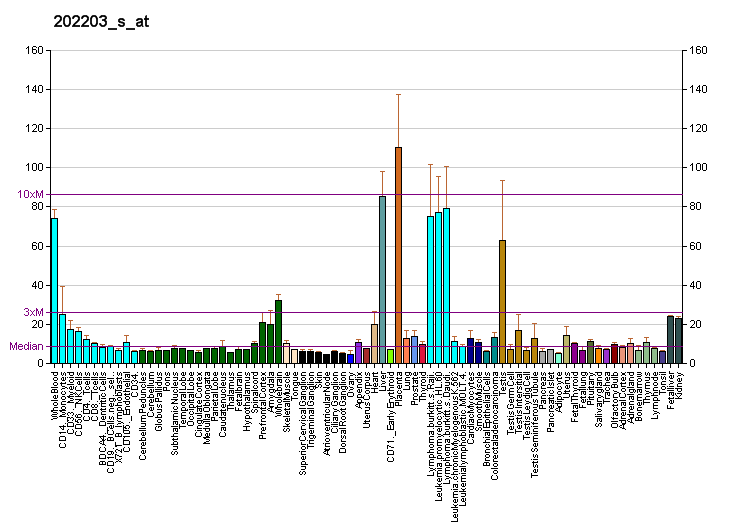
RNA expression pattern
| Bgee | Human / Mouse (ortholog); Top expressed in: stromal cell of endometrium; right testis; left testis; gastrocnemius muscle; muscle of thigh; right adrenal cortex; Achilles tendon; ventricular zone; left adrenal gland; left adrenal cortex / Top expressed in: spermatocyte; Ileal epithelium; spermatid; secondary oocyte; granulocyte; decidua; ankle; dentate gyrus of hippocampal formation granule cell; triceps brachii muscle; digastric muscle; More reference expression data |
| BioGPS | More reference expression data |
Gene ontology
| Molecular function | protein-macromolecule adaptor activity; chaperone binding; ubiquitin protein ligase activity; metal ion binding; ubiquitin-protein transferase activity; ubiquitin-ubiquitin ligase activity; protein binding; ubiquitin-specific protease binding; transferase activity; identical protein binding; BAT3 complex binding; signaling receptor activity |
| Cellular component | cytoplasm; integral component of membrane; membrane; growth cone; integral component of endoplasmic reticulum membrane; soma; dendrite; Derlin-1 retrotranslocation complex; perinuclear region of cytoplasm; nucleus; endoplasmic reticulum; endoplasmic reticulum membrane; Golgi apparatus; endoplasmic reticulum quality control compartment; protein-containing complex; ubiquitin ligase complex; cytosol |
| Biological process | ERAD pathway; ubiquitin-dependent protein catabolic process; ageing; protein polyubiquitination; endoplasmic reticulum unfolded protein response; protein K48-linked ubiquitination; protein complex oligomerization; protein ubiquitination; ubiquitin-dependent ERAD pathway; learning or memory; positive regulation of protein binding; signal transduction; protein autoubiquitination; protein folding; endoplasmic reticulum mannose trimming |
Sources:Amigo / QuickGO
Orthologs
| Databases | NCBI: entry; OMA: entry |
| Species | Human | Mouse |
| Entrez | 267 | 23802 |
| Ensembl | ENSG00000159461 | ENSMUSG00000031751 |
| UniProt | Q9UKV5 | Q9R049 |
| RefSeq (mRNA) | NM_001144; NM_138958; NM_001323511; NM_001323512 | NM_011787 |
| RefSeq (protein) | NP_001135; NP_001310440; NP_001310441 | NP_035917 |
| Location (UCSC) | Chr 16: 56.36 – 56.43 Mb | Chr 8: 94.7 – 94.74 Mb |
| PubMed search |
- Wikidata
| View/Edit Human | View/Edit Mouse |

Autocrine motility factor receptor, isoform 2 is a protein that in humans is encoded by the AMFR gene.

Autocrine motility factor is a tumor motility-stimulating protein secreted by tumor cells. The protein encoded by this gene is a glycosylated transmembrane protein and a receptor for autocrine motility factor. The receptor, which shows some sequence similarity to tumor protein p53, is localized to the leading and trailing edges of carcinoma cells.

== Interactions ==
AMFR has been shown to interact with Valosin-containing protein.
