= Triokinase =

Identifiers
- EC no.: 2.7.1.28
- CAS no.: 9030-65-3

Databases
- IntEnz: IntEnz view
- BRENDA: BRENDA entry
- ExPASy: NiceZyme view
- KEGG: KEGG entry
- MetaCyc: metabolic pathway
- PRIAM: profile
- PDB structures: RCSB PDB PDBe PDBsum
- Gene Ontology: AmiGO / QuickGO
Search
- PMC: articles
- PubMed: articles
- NCBI: proteins

Triokinase (EC 2.7.1.28) is an enzyme that catalyzes the chemical reaction

ATP +
D-glyceraldehyde
ADP +
D-glyceraldehyde 3-phosphate

The enzyme characterised from liver converts D-glyceraldehyde to D-glyceraldehyde 3-phosphate by transferring a phosphate group from the cofactor, adenosine triphosphate (ATP), which is converted to adenosine diphosphate (ADP).

This enzyme is a transferase, specifically one transferring phosphorus-containing groups (phosphotransferases) with an alcohol group as acceptor. The systematic name of this enzyme class is ATP:D-glyceraldehyde 3-phosphotransferase. This enzyme is also called triose kinase. It participates in fructose metabolism.
