= Glycerol dehydrogenase (NADP+) =

glycerol dehydrogenase (NADP^{+})

Identifiers
- EC no.: 1.1.1.72
- CAS no.: 37250-11-6

Databases
- IntEnz: IntEnz view
- BRENDA: BRENDA entry
- ExPASy: NiceZyme view
- KEGG: KEGG entry
- MetaCyc: metabolic pathway
- PRIAM: profile
- PDB structures: RCSB PDB PDBe PDBsum
- Gene Ontology: AmiGO / QuickGO
Search
- PMC: articles
- PubMed: articles
- NCBI: proteins

In enzymology, a glycerol dehydrogenase (NADP^{+}) (EC 1.1.1.72) is an enzyme that catalyzes the chemical reaction

glycerol
+ NADP^{+}
H^{+}
H^{+}
D-glyceraldehyde
+ NADPH

The two substrates of this enzyme are glycerol and oxidised nicotinamide adenine dinucleotide phosphate (NADP^{+}). Its products are D-glyceraldehyde, NADPH, and a proton.

This enzyme belongs to the family of oxidoreductases, specifically those acting on the CH-OH group of donor with NAD^{+} or NADP^{+} as acceptor. The systematic name of this enzyme class is glycerol:NADP^{+} oxidoreductase. This enzyme is also called glycerol dehydrogenase (NADP^{+}). This enzyme participates in glycerolipid metabolism.
