= GLUT5 =

Protein found in humans

SLC2A5
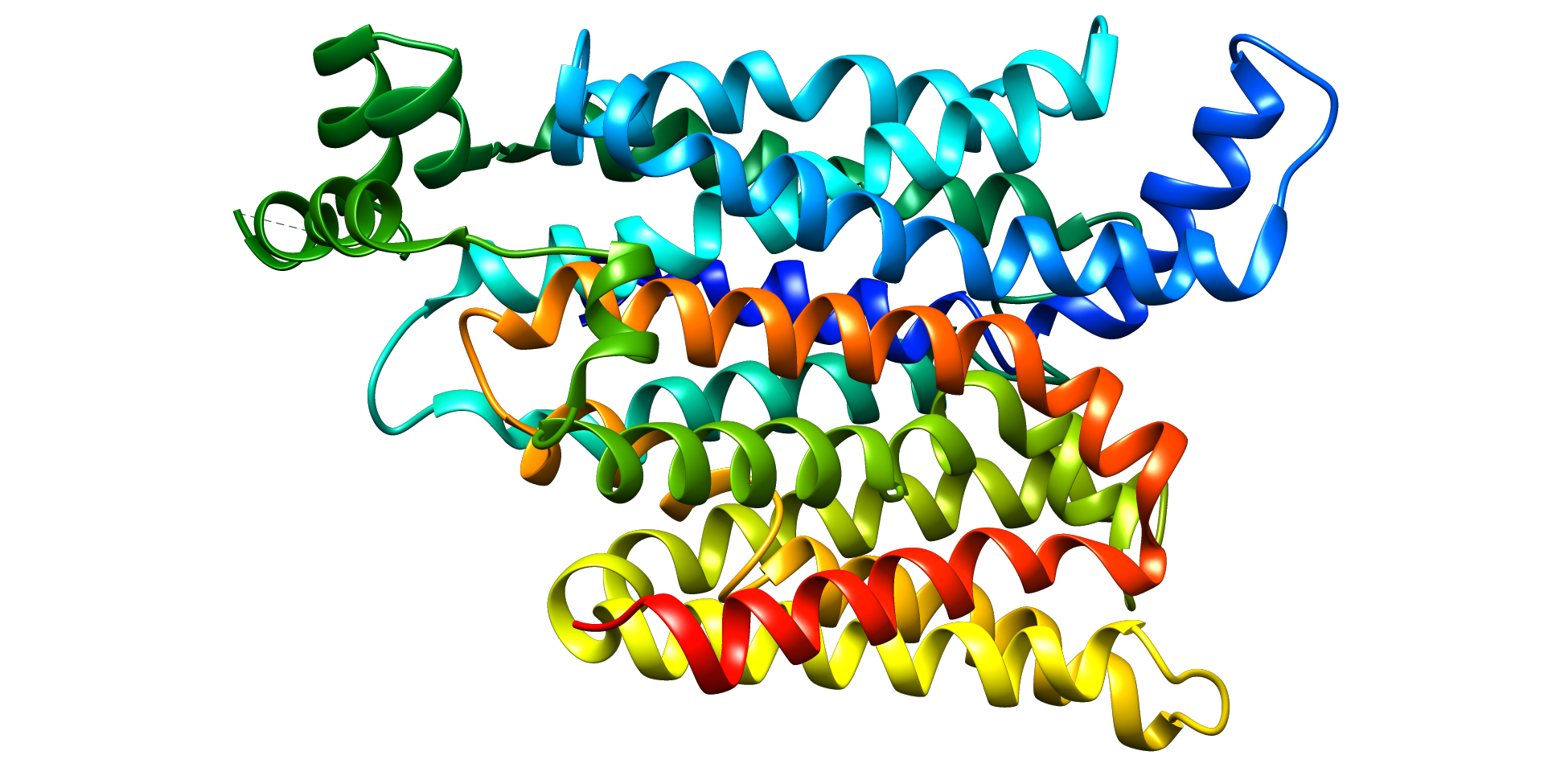

Identifiers
- Aliases: SLC2A5, GLUT-5, GLUT5, solute carrier family 2 member 5
- External IDs: OMIM: 138230; MGI: 1928369; GeneCards: SLC2A5
Available structures
PDB	Ortholog search: PDBe RCSB
PDB	List of PDB id codes 4YB9, 4YBQ

Gene location (Human)
Chr.	Chromosome 1 (human)
Band	1p36.23	Start	9,035,106 bp
Band	1p36.23	End	9,088,478 bp

Gene location (Mouse)
Chr.	Chromosome 4 (mouse)
Band	4|4 E2	Start	150,203,740 bp
Band	4|4 E2	End	150,228,626 bp
RNA expression pattern
Bgee	Human / Mouse (ortholog); Top expressed in: jejunal mucosa; duodenum; biceps brachii; Skeletal muscle tissue of biceps brachii; vastus lateralis muscle; muscle of thigh; left testis; triceps brachii muscle; right testis; bone marrow / Top expressed in: seminiferous tubule; spermatid; spermatocyte; islet of Langerhans; right kidney; duodenum; proximal tubule; parotid gland; human kidney; jejunum; More reference expression data
BioGPS	n/a
Gene ontology
Molecular function	transmembrane transporter activity; transporter activity; fructose binding; fructose transmembrane transporter activity; glucose transmembrane transporter activity
Cellular component	integral component of membrane; membrane; plasma membrane; integral component of plasma membrane; apical plasma membrane; sarcolemma; extracellular exosome; specific granule membrane
Biological process	cellular response to fructose stimulus; fructose transmembrane transport; carbohydrate transport; fructose import across plasma membrane; response to fructose; transmembrane transport; glucose transmembrane transport; regulation of systemic arterial blood pressure mediated by a chemical signal; neutrophil degranulation; intestinal hexose absorption; transport; carbohydrate metabolic process
Sources:Amigo / QuickGO
Orthologs
Databases	NCBI: entry; OMA: entry
Species	Human	Mouse
Entrez	6518	56485
Ensembl	ENSG00000142583	ENSMUSG00000028976
UniProt	P22732	Q9WV38
RefSeq (mRNA)	NM_001135585; NM_003039; NM_001328619; NM_001328620; NM_001328621	NM_019741
RefSeq (protein)	NP_001129057; NP_001315548; NP_001315549; NP_001315550; NP_003030	NP_062715
Location (UCSC)	Chr 1: 9.04 – 9.09 Mb	Chr 4: 150.2 – 150.23 Mb
PubMed search
- Wikidata
View/Edit Human	View/Edit Mouse

GLUT5 is a fructose transporter expressed on the apical border of enterocytes in the small intestine. GLUT5 allows for fructose to be transported from the intestinal lumen into the enterocyte by facilitated diffusion due to fructose's high concentration in the intestinal lumen. GLUT5 is also expressed in skeletal muscle, testis, kidney, fat tissue (adipocytes), and brain.

Fructose malabsorption or Dietary Fructose Intolerance is a dietary disability of the small intestine, where the amount of fructose carrier in enterocytes is deficient.

In humans the GLUT5 protein is encoded by the SLC2A5 gene.

== Regulation ==
Fructose uptake rate by GLUT5 is significantly reduced by diabetes mellitus, hypertension, obesity, fructose malabsorption, and inflammation. However, age-related changes in fructose intake capability are not explained by the rate of expression of GLUT5. The absorption of fructose in the simultaneous presence of glucose is improved, while sorbitol is inhibitory. Fructose absorption by GLUT5 can be investigated using intestinal organoids.

== Interactive pathway map ==
Click on genes, proteins and metabolites below to link to respective articles. (Note: The interactive pathway map can be edited at WikiPathways: "GlycolysisGluconeogenesis_WP534".)

Glycolysis and Gluconeogenesis edit
