= Fructokinase =

Class of enzymes

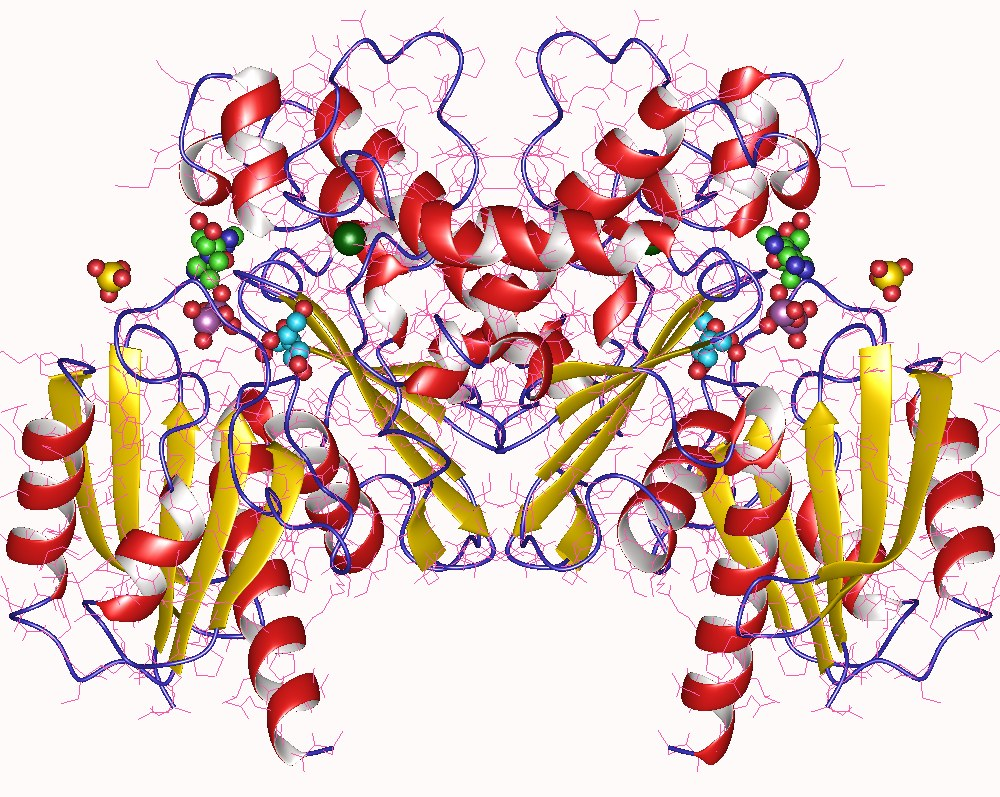
- Fructokinase dimer, Bacillus subtilis

Identifiers
- EC no.: 2.7.1.4
- CAS no.: 9030-51-7

Databases
- BRENDA: enzyme data
- ExPASy: NiceZyme view
- KEGG: enzyme entry
- MetaCyc: metabolic pathway
- Rhea: reactions
- PDB structures: RCSB PDB PDBe PDBsum
Search
- PMC: articles
- PubMed: articles
- NCBI: proteins

Fructokinase (EC 2.7.1.4), also known as D-fructokinase, is an enzyme that transfers a phosphate group from adenosine triphosphate (ATP) to D-fructose, producing D-fructose 6-phosphate. Its systematic name is ATP:D-fructose 6-phosphotransferase. In enzyme nomenclature, it is distinct from ketohexokinase (EC 2.7.1.3), which instead produces D-fructose 1-phosphate.

== Role in plants and bacteria ==
Fructokinase has been characterized from various organisms, such as pea (Pisum sativum) seeds, avocado (Persera americana) fruit, and maize (Zea mays) kernels, and many more.

Specifically, fructokinase may also regulate starch synthesis in conjunction with sucrose synthase. There are also two divergent fructokinase genes that are differentially expressed and which also have different enzymatic properties such as those found in tomatoes. In tomatoes, fructokinase 1 (Frk 1) mRNA is expressed at a constant level during fruit development. However, fructokinase 2 (Frk 2) mRNA has a high expression level in young tomato fruit but then decreases during the later stages of fruit development. Frk 2 has a higher affinity for fructose than Frk 1 but Frk 2 activity is inhibited by high levels of fructose, whereas Frk 1 activity is not.

In Sinorhizobium meliloti, a common gram-soil bacterium, fructokinase is also used in the metabolism of mannitol and sorbitol, in addition to the metabolism of fructose.

== Reaction ==
Fructokinase catalyzes the following reaction:

ATP +
fructose
ADP +
fructose 6-phosphate

== See also ==
- Hepatic fructokinase
- PFKL
- PFKM
- PFKP
- Glucokinase
- Hexokinase
