= Fructose =

Simple ketonic monosaccharide found in many plants

d-Fructose
d-Fructofuranose
Fischer projection of open-chain d-fructose
- Haworth projection of β-d-fructofuranose

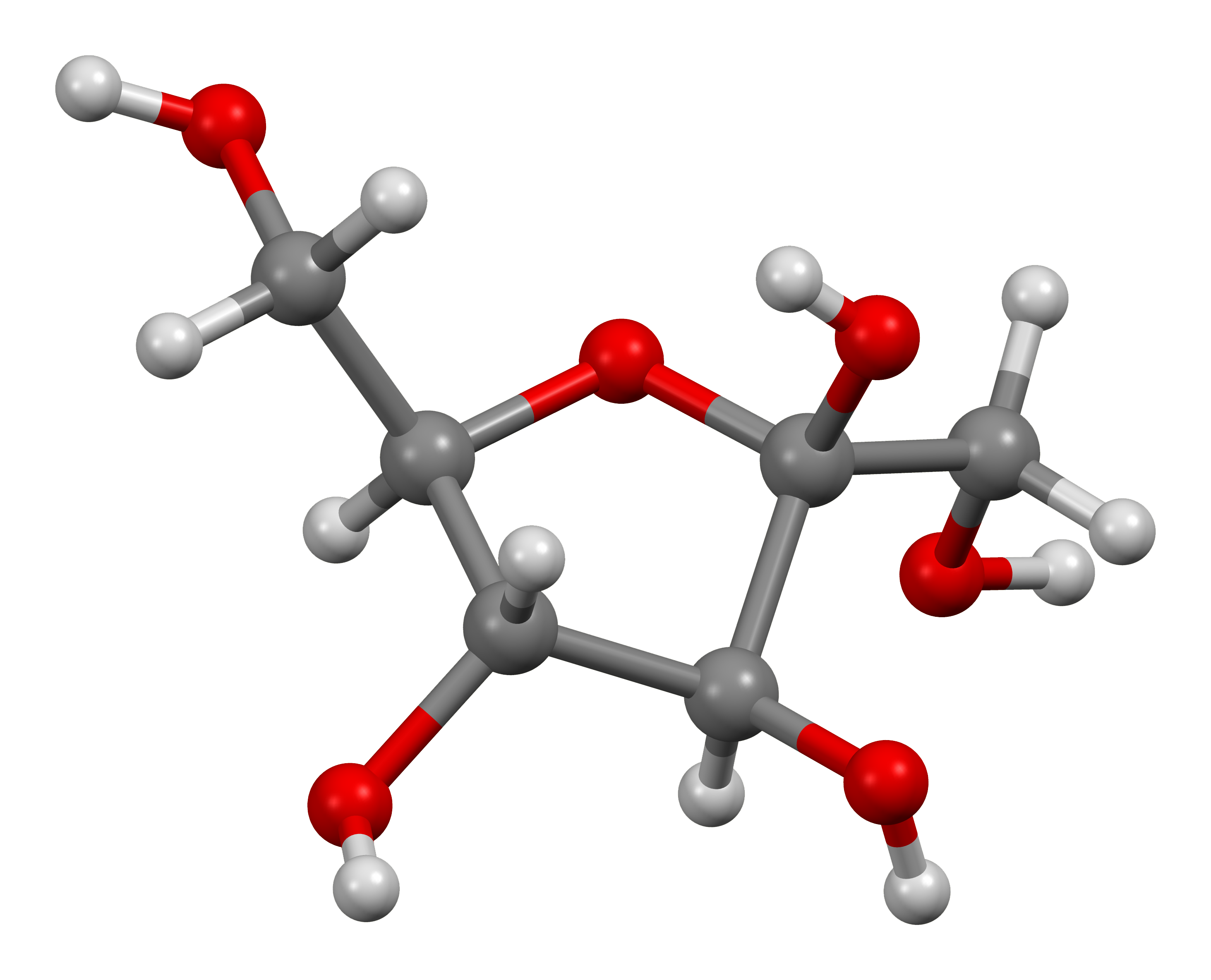
Ball-and-stick model of β-d-fructofuranose
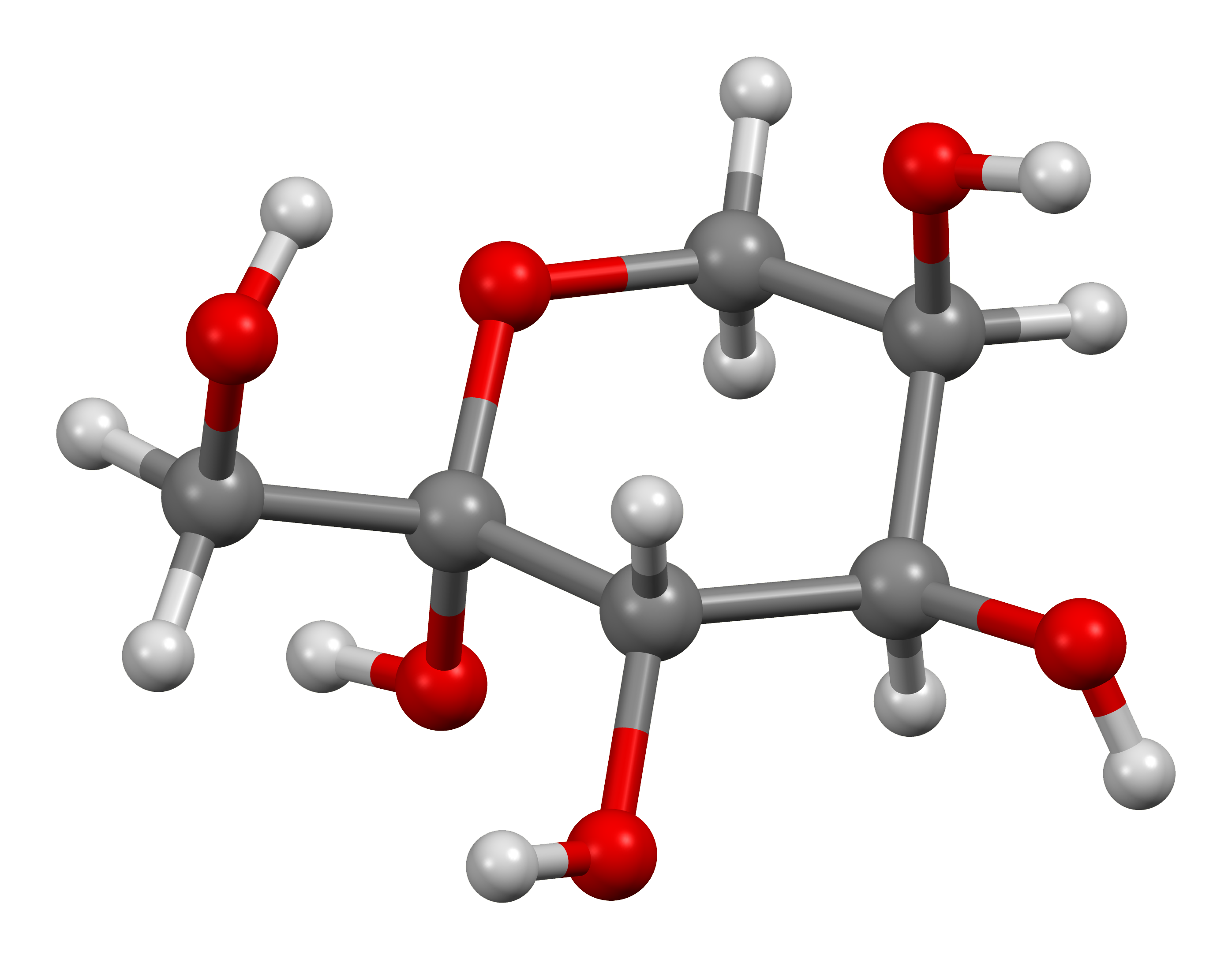
Ball-and-stick model of β-d-fructopyranose

Names
- IUPAC name D-arabino-Hex-2-ulose
- Systematic IUPAC name (3S,4R,5R)-1,3,4,5,6-Pentahydroxyhexan-2-one
- Other names Fruit sugar, levulose, d-fructofuranose, d-fructose, d-arabino-hexulose

Identifiers
CAS Number	57-48-7
3D model (JSmol)	Interactive image
ChEBI	CHEBI:48095
ChEMBL	ChEMBL604608
ChemSpider	388775
ECHA InfoCard	100.000.303
EC Number	200-333-3
KEGG	C02336
PubChem CID	5984
UNII	6YSS42VSEV
CompTox Dashboard (EPA)	DTXSID5023081
- InChI: InChI=1S/C6H12O6/c7-1-3-4(9)5(10)6(11,2-8)12-3/h3-5,7-11H,1-2H2/t3-,4-,5+,6-/m1/s1 Key: RFSUNEUAIZKAJO-ARQDHWQXSA-N
- SMILES: O[C@H]1[C@H](O)[C@H](O[C@]1(O)CO)CO

Properties
Chemical formula	C_{6}H_{12}O_{6}
Molar mass	180.156 g·mol^{−1}
Density	1.694 g/cm^{3}
Melting point	103 °C (217 °F; 376 K)
Solubility in water	~4000 g/L (25 °C)
Magnetic susceptibility (χ)	−102.60×10^{−6} cm^{3}/mol

Thermochemistry
Std enthalpy of combustion (Δ_{c}H^{⦵}_{298})	675.6 kcal/mol (2,827 kJ/mol) (Higher heating value)

Pharmacology
ATC code	V06DC02 (WHO)

Hazards
- Lethal dose or concentration (LD, LC)
LD_{50} (median dose)	15000 mg/kg (intravenous, rabbit)
- Except where otherwise noted, data are given for materials in their standard state (at 25 °C [77 °F], 100 kPa). verify (what is ?) Infobox references

Fructose (/ˈfrʌktoʊs, -oʊz/) is sugar, specifically a sugar monomer or monosaccharide. It is a reducing hexose, more specifically a ketose, and is found in many plants where it is often bound to glucose to form the disaccharide sucrose, or as free fructose. A white, water-soluble solid, it is one of the three most common dietary monosaccharides, along with glucose and galactose. Fructose is found in honey, tree and vine fruits, flowers, berries, and most root vegetables. It has a relative sweetness roughly twice that of glucose.

== History ==
Fructose was discovered by French chemist Augustin-Pierre Dubrunfaut in 1847. The name "fructose" was coined in 1857 by the English chemist William Allen Miller. Pure, dry fructose is a sweet, white, odorless, crystalline solid, and is the most water-soluble of all the sugars.

== Etymology ==
The word "fructose" was coined in 1857 from the Latin for fructus (fruit) and the generic chemical suffix for sugars, -ose. It is also called fruit sugar and levulose or laevulose, due to its ability to rotate plane polarised light in a laevorotary fashion (anti-clockwise/to the left) when a beam is shone through it in solution. Likewise, dextrose (an isomer of glucose) is given its name due to its ability to rotate plane polarised light in a dextrorotary fashion (clockwise/to the right).

== Chemical structure ==
Relationship between the acyclic and the cyclic (hemiketal) isomers of fructose

d- and l-isomers of fructose (open-chain form)

Fructose adopts both cyclic six- and five-membered structure, The six membered ring can exist as either the β-d-fructopyranose and α-d-fructopyranose. The five-membered rings exists as either of two isomers β-d-fructofuranose and α-d-fructofuranose. Additionally, an acyclic (open-chain) form exists: keto-d-fructose. At 70% and 22% respectively, fructopyranose and fructofuranose are the dominant species in aqueous solution.

=== Chemical reactions ===
==== Fructose and fermentation ====
Fructose may be anaerobically fermented by yeast and bacteria. Yeast enzymes convert sugar (sucrose, glucose, and fructose, but not lactose) to ethanol and carbon dioxide. Some of the carbon dioxide produced during fermentation will remain dissolved in water, where it will reach equilibrium with carbonic acid. The dissolved carbon dioxide and carbonic acid produce the carbonation in some fermented beverages, such as champagne.

==== Fructose and Maillard reaction ====
Fructose undergoes the Maillard reaction, non-enzymatic browning, with amino acids. Because fructose exists to a greater extent in the open-chain form than does glucose, the initial stages of the Maillard reaction occur more rapidly than with glucose. Therefore, fructose has potential to contribute to changes in food palatability, as well as other nutritional effects, such as excessive browning, volume and tenderness reduction during cake preparation, and formation of mutagenic compounds.

==== Dehydration ====
Fructose can be dehydrated to give hydroxymethylfurfural ("HMF", C_{6}H_{6}O_{3}), which can be processed into liquid dimethylfuran (C_{6}H_{8}O). This conversion has long been proposed, not implemented, as a route to green fuels.

== Physical and functional properties ==
=== Sweetness of fructose ===
The primary reason that fructose is used commercially in foods and beverages, besides its low cost, is its high relative sweetness. It is the sweetest of all naturally occurring carbohydrates. The relative sweetness of fructose has been reported in the range of 1.2–1.8 times that of sucrose. However, it is the 6-membered ring form of fructose that is sweeter; the 5-membered ring form tastes about the same as usual table sugar. Warming fructose leads to formation of the 5-membered ring form. Therefore, the relative sweetness decreases with increasing temperature. However, it has been observed that the absolute sweetness of fructose is identical at 5 °C as 50 °C and thus the relative sweetness to sucrose is not due to anomeric distribution but a decrease in the absolute sweetness of sucrose at higher temperatures.

Relative sweetness of sugars and sweeteners

The sweetness of fructose is perceived earlier than that of sucrose or glucose, and the taste sensation reaches a peak (higher than that of sucrose), and diminishes more quickly than that of sucrose. Fructose can also enhance other flavors in the system.

Fructose exhibits a sweetness synergy effect when used in combination with other sweeteners. The relative sweetness of fructose blended with sucrose, aspartame, or saccharin is perceived to be greater than the sweetness calculated from individual components.

=== Fructose solubility and crystallization ===
Fructose has higher water solubility than other sugars, as well as other sugar alcohols. Fructose is, therefore, difficult to crystallize from an aqueous solution. Sugar mixes containing fructose, such as candies, are softer than those containing other sugars because of the greater solubility of fructose.

=== Fructose hygroscopicity and humectancy ===
Fructose is quicker to absorb moisture and slower to release it to the environment than sucrose, glucose, or other nutritive sweeteners. Fructose is an excellent humectant and retains moisture for a long period of time even at low relative humidity (RH). Therefore, fructose can contribute a more palatable texture, and longer shelf life to the food products in which it is used.

=== Freezing point ===
Fructose has a greater effect on freezing point depression than disaccharides or oligosaccharides, which may protect the integrity of cell walls of fruit by reducing ice crystal formation. However, this characteristic may be undesirable in soft-serve or hard-frozen dairy desserts.

=== Fructose and starch functionality in food systems ===
Fructose increases starch viscosity more rapidly and achieves a higher final viscosity than sucrose because fructose lowers the temperature required during gelatinizing of starch, causing a greater final viscosity.

Although some artificial sweeteners are not suitable for home baking, many traditional recipes use fructose.

== Sources ==
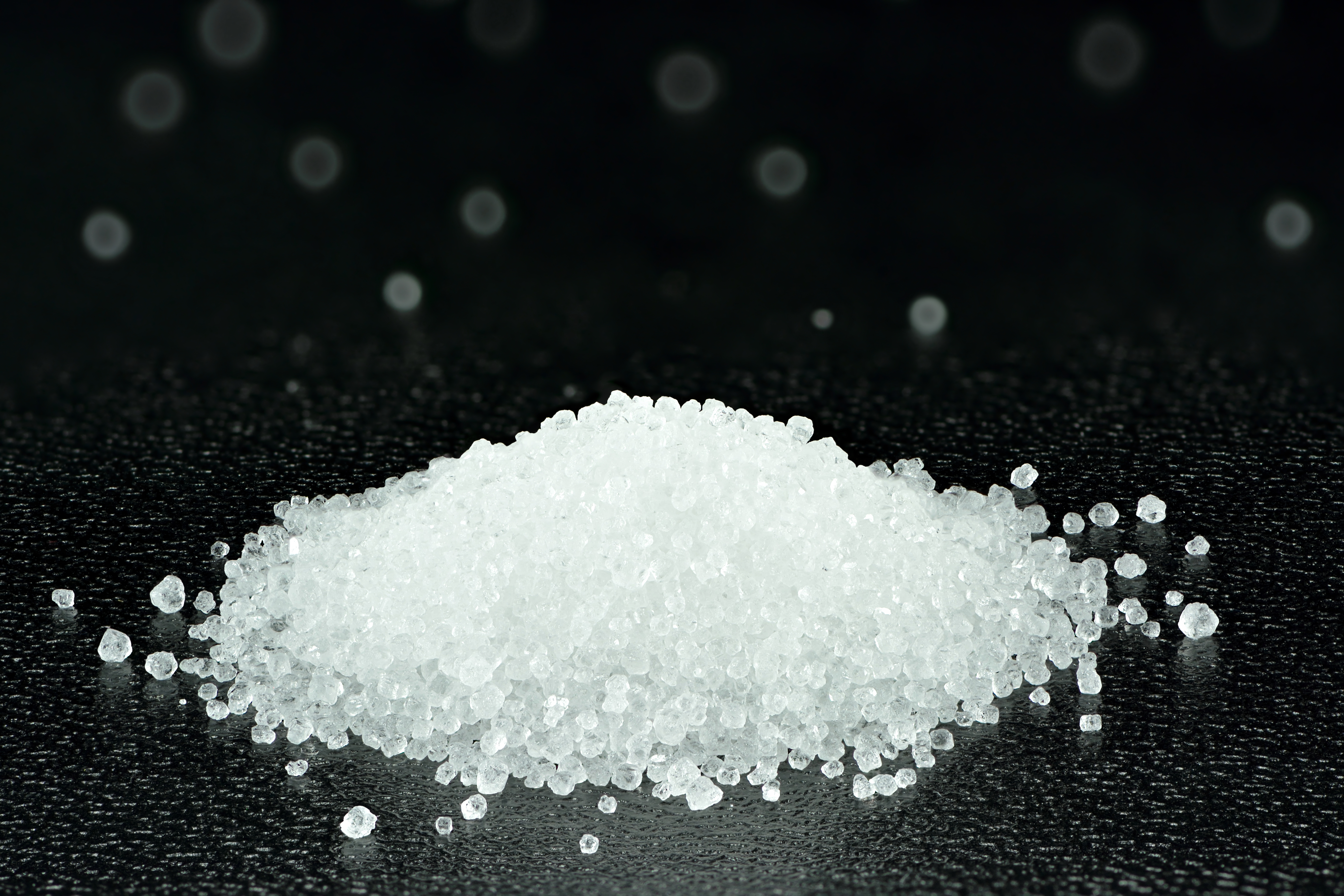
Crystalline fructose

=== Commercial production ===
Fructose is produced on an industrial scale from three precursors: starch, sucrose, and inulin. Sucrose is an organic compound with one molecule of glucose covalently linked to one molecule of fructose. All forms of fructose, including those found in fruits and juices, are commonly added to foods and drinks for palatability and taste enhancement, and for browning of some foods, such as baked goods. Fructose is found in honey, tree and vine fruits, flowers, berries, and most root vegetables.

Starch is hydrolyzed to glucose, which is converted to fructose by the enzyme glucose isomerase. This mixture is high-fructose corn syrup. At 60 °C, the conversion gives a 1:1 mixture of glucose and fructose. Sucrose is hydrolyzed to give its monomeric precursors glucose and fructose. Inulin is also converted to fructose on a commercial scale. As of 2004, about 240,000 tonnes of crystalline fructose were being produced annually. Commercially, maize is a major source of starch. Sugar cane and sugar beets are sources of sucrose, a compound with one molecule of glucose covalently linked to one molecule of fructose. Inulin is found in the roots of certain plants such as chicory.

=== Natural sources ===
Natural sources of fructose include fruits, vegetables (including sugar cane), and honey. Fructose is often further concentrated from these sources. The highest dietary sources of fructose, besides pure crystalline fructose, are foods containing white sugar (sucrose), high-fructose corn syrup, agave nectar, honey, molasses, maple syrup, fruit and fruit juices, as these have the highest percentages of fructose (including fructose in sucrose) per serving compared to other common foods and ingredients. Fructose exists in foods either as a free monosaccharide or bound to glucose as sucrose, a disaccharide. Fructose, glucose, and sucrose may all be present in food; however, different foods will have varying levels of each of these three sugars.

The sugar contents of common fruits and vegetables are presented in Table 1. In general, in foods that contain free fructose, the ratio of fructose to glucose is approximately 1:1; that is, foods with fructose usually contain about an equal amount of free glucose. A value that is above 1 indicates a higher proportion of fructose to glucose and below 1 a lower proportion. Some fruits have larger proportions of fructose to glucose compared to others. For example, apples and pears contain more than twice as much free fructose as glucose, while for apricots the proportion is less than half as much fructose as glucose.

Apple and pear juices are of particular interest to pediatricians because the high concentrations of free fructose in these juices can cause diarrhea in children. The cells (enterocytes) that line children's small intestines have less affinity for fructose absorption than for glucose and sucrose. Unabsorbed fructose creates higher osmolarity in the small intestine, which draws water into the gastrointestinal tract, resulting in osmotic diarrhea. This phenomenon is discussed in greater detail in the Health Effects section.

Table 1 also shows the amount of sucrose found in common fruits and vegetables. Sugarcane and sugar beet have a high concentration of sucrose, and are used for commercial preparation of pure sucrose. Extracted cane or beet juice is clarified, removing impurities; and concentrated by removing excess water. The end product is 99.9%-pure sucrose. Sucrose-containing sugars include common white sugar and powdered sugar, as well as brown sugar.

Sugar content of selected common plant foods (g/100g)
Food Item	Total carbohydrate^{A} including "dietary fiber"	Total sugars	Free fructose	Free glucose	Sucrose	Fructose/ glucose ratio	Sucrose as a % of total sugars	Free fructose as a % of total sugars
Fruits
Apple	13.8	10.4	5.9	2.4	2.1	2.0	19.9	57
Apricot	11.1	9.2	0.9	2.4	5.9	0.7	63.5	10
Banana	22.8	12.2	4.9	5.0	2.4	1.0	20.0	40
Fig, dried	63.9	47.9	22.9	24.8	0.9?	0.93	1.9	47.8
Grapes	18.1	15.5	8.1	7.2	0.2	1.1	1	52
Navel orange	12.5	8.5	2.25	2.0	4.3	1.1	50.4	26
Peach	9.5	8.4	1.5	2.0	4.8	0.9	56.7	18
Pear	15.5	9.8	6.2	2.8	0.8	2.1	8.0	63
Pineapple	13.1	9.9	2.1	1.7	6.0	1.1	60.8	21
Plum	11.4	9.9	3.1	5.1	1.6	0.66	16.2	31
Vegetables
Beet, Red	9.6	6.8	0.1	0.1	6.5	1.0	96.2	1.5
Carrot	9.6	4.7	0.6	0.6	3.6	1.0	77	13
Red Pepper, Sweet	6.0	4.2	2.3	1.9	0.0	1.2	0.0	55
Onion, Sweet	7.6	5.0	2.0	2.3	0.7	0.9	14.3	40
Sweet Potato	20.1	4.2	0.7	1.0	2.5	0.9	60.3	17
Yam	27.9	0.5	tr	tr	tr	na	tr	
Sugar Cane		13–18	0.2 – 1.0	0.2 – 1.0	11–16	1.0	high	1.5-5.6
Sugar Beet		17–18	0.1 – 0.5	0.1 – 0.5	16–17	1.0	high	0.59-2.8
Grains
Maize, Sweet	19.0	6.2	1.9	3.4	0.9	0.61	15.0	31

^A The carbohydrate figure is calculated in FoodData Central and does not always correspond to the sum of the sugars, the starch, and the "dietary fiber".

All data with a unit of g (gram) are based on 100 g of a food item. The fructose/glucose ratio includes fructose and glucose from sucrose, i.e. 1 mol (342.3 g) of sucrose is counted as equivalent to 1 mol (180.16 g) of glucose + 1 mol (180.16 g) of fructose.

Fructose is also found in the manufactured sweetener, high-fructose corn syrup (HFCS), which is produced by treating corn syrup with enzymes, converting glucose into fructose. The common designations for fructose content, HFCS-42 and HFCS-55, indicate the percentage of fructose present in HFCS. HFCS-55 is commonly used as a sweetener for soft drinks, whereas HFCS-42 is used to sweeten processed foods, breakfast cereals, bakery foods, and some soft drinks.

=== Carbohydrate content of commercial sweeteners (percent on dry basis) ===
Sugar	Fructose	Glucose	Sucrose (Fructose+Glucose)	Other sugars
Granulated sugar	0	0	100	0
Caramel	1	1	97	1
HFCS-42	42	53	0	5
HFCS-55	55	41	0	4
HFCS-90	90	5	0	5
Honey	50	44	1	5
Maple syrup	1	4	95	0
Molasses	23	21	53	3
Tapioca Syrup	55	45	0	0
Corn syrup	0	98	0	2

for HFCS, and USDA for fruits and vegetables and the other refined sugars.

Cane and beet sugars have been used as the major sweetener in food manufacturing for centuries. However, with the development of HFCS, a significant shift occurred in the type of sweetener consumption in certain countries, particularly the United States. Contrary to the popular belief, however, with the increase of HFCS consumption, the total fructose intake relative to the total glucose intake has not dramatically changed. Granulated sugar is 99.9%-pure sucrose, which means that it has equal ratio of fructose to glucose. The most commonly used forms of HFCS, HFCS-42, and HFCS-55, have a roughly equal ratio of fructose to glucose, with minor differences. HFCS has simply replaced sucrose as a sweetener. Therefore, despite the changes in the sweetener consumption, the ratio of glucose to fructose intake has remained relatively constant.

Adjusted consumption of refined sugar per capita in the US

=== Nutritional information ===
Providing 368 kcal per 100 grams of dry powder (table), fructose has 95% the caloric value of sucrose by weight. Fructose powder is 100% carbohydrates and supplies no other nutrients in significant amount (table).

Fructose, dry powdered
Nutritional value per 100 g (3.5 oz)
- Energy: 368 kcal (1,540 kJ)
- Carbohydrates: 100 g
- Fat: 0 g
- Protein: 0 g
Vitamins and minerals
Minerals	Quantity %DV^{†}
Calcium	0% 0 mg
Iron	1% 0.1 mg
Phosphorus	0% 0 mg
Potassium	0% 0 mg
Sodium	1% 12 mg
- Full Link to USDA Database entry
- ^{†}Percentages estimated using US recommendations for adults, except for potassium, which is estimated based on expert recommendation from the National Academies.

== Fructose digestion and absorption in humans ==
Hydrolysis of sucrose to glucose and fructose by sucrase

Intestinal sugar transport proteins

Fructose exists in foods either as a monosaccharide (free fructose) or as a unit of a disaccharide (sucrose). Free fructose is a ketonic simple sugar and one of the three dietary monosaccharides absorbed directly by the intestine. When fructose is consumed in the form of sucrose, it is digested (broken down) and then absorbed as free fructose. As sucrose comes into contact with the membrane of the small intestine, the enzyme sucrase catalyzes the cleavage of sucrose to yield one glucose unit and one fructose unit, which are then each absorbed. After absorption, it enters the hepatic portal vein and is directed toward the liver.

The mechanism of fructose absorption in the small intestine is not completely understood. Some evidence suggests active transport, because fructose uptake has been shown to occur against a concentration gradient. However, the majority of research supports the claim that fructose absorption occurs on the mucosal membrane via facilitated transport involving GLUT5 transport proteins. Since the concentration of fructose is higher in the lumen, fructose is able to flow down a concentration gradient into the enterocytes, assisted by transport proteins. Fructose may be transported out of the enterocyte across the basolateral membrane by either GLUT2 or GLUT5, although the GLUT2 transporter has a greater capacity for transporting fructose, and, therefore, the majority of fructose is transported out of the enterocyte through GLUT2.

=== Capacity and rate of absorption ===
The absorption capacity for fructose in monosaccharide form ranges from less than 5 g to 50 g (per individual serving) and adapts with changes in dietary fructose intake. Studies show the greatest absorption rate occurs when glucose and fructose are administered in equal quantities. When fructose is ingested as part of the disaccharide sucrose, absorption capacity is much higher because fructose exists in a 1:1 ratio with glucose. It appears that the GLUT5 transfer rate may be saturated at low levels, and absorption is increased through joint absorption with glucose. One proposed mechanism for this phenomenon is a glucose-dependent cotransport of fructose.

In addition, fructose transfer activity increases with dietary fructose intake. The presence of fructose in the lumen causes increased mRNA transcription of GLUT5, leading to increased transport proteins. High-fructose diets (>2.4 g/kg body wt) increase the transport proteins within three days of intake.

=== Malabsorption ===
Several studies have measured the intestinal absorption of fructose using the hydrogen breath test. These studies indicate that fructose is not completely absorbed in the small intestine. When fructose is not absorbed in the small intestine, it is transported into the large intestine, where it is fermented by the colonic flora. Hydrogen is produced during the fermentation process and dissolves into the blood of the portal vein. This hydrogen is transported to the lungs, where it is exchanged across the lungs and is measurable by the hydrogen breath test. The colonic flora also produces carbon dioxide, short-chain fatty acids, organic acids, and trace gases in the presence of unabsorbed fructose. The presence of gases and organic acids in the large intestine causes gastrointestinal symptoms such as bloating, diarrhea, flatulence, and gastrointestinal pain. Exercise immediately after consumption can exacerbate these symptoms by decreasing transit time in the small intestine, resulting in a greater amount of fructose emptied into the large intestine.

== Fructose metabolism ==
The liver converts most fructose and galactose into glucose for distribution in the bloodstream or deposition into glycogen.

All three dietary monosaccharides are transported into the liver by the GLUT2 transporter. Fructose and galactose are phosphorylated in the liver by fructokinase (K_{m}= 0.5 mM) and galactokinase (K_{m} = 0.8 mM), respectively. By contrast, glucose tends to pass through the liver (K_{m} of hepatic glucokinase = 10 mM) and can be metabolised anywhere in the body. Uptake of fructose by the liver is not regulated by insulin. However, insulin is capable of increasing the abundance and functional activity of GLUT5, fructose transporter, in skeletal muscle cells.

=== Fructolysis ===
The initial catabolism of fructose is sometimes referred to as fructolysis, in analogy with glycolysis, the catabolism of glucose. In fructolysis, the enzyme fructokinase initially produces fructose 1-phosphate, which is split by aldolase B to produce the trioses dihydroxyacetone phosphate (DHAP) and glyceraldehyde. Unlike glycolysis, in fructolysis the triose glyceraldehyde lacks a phosphate group. A third enzyme, triokinase, is therefore required to phosphorylate glyceraldehyde, producing glyceraldehyde 3-phosphate. The resulting trioses are identical to those obtained in glycolysis and can enter the gluconeogenic pathway for glucose or glycogen synthesis, or be further catabolized through the lower glycolytic pathway to pyruvate.

=== Metabolism of fructose to DHAP and glyceraldehyde ===
The first step in the metabolism of fructose is the phosphorylation of fructose to fructose 1-phosphate by fructokinase, thus trapping fructose for metabolism in the liver. Fructose 1-phosphate then undergoes hydrolysis by aldolase B to form DHAP and glyceraldehydes; DHAP can either be isomerized to glyceraldehyde 3-phosphate by triosephosphate isomerase or undergo reduction to glycerol 3-phosphate by glycerol 3-phosphate dehydrogenase. The glyceraldehyde produced may also be converted to glyceraldehyde 3-phosphate by glyceraldehyde kinase or further converted to glycerol 3-phosphate by glycerol 3-phosphate dehydrogenase. The metabolism of fructose at this point yields intermediates in the gluconeogenic pathway leading to glycogen synthesis as well as fatty acid and triglyceride synthesis.

=== Synthesis of glycogen from DHAP and glyceraldehyde 3-phosphate ===
The resultant glyceraldehyde formed by aldolase B then undergoes phosphorylation to glyceraldehyde 3-phosphate. Increased concentrations of DHAP and glyceraldehyde 3-phosphate in the liver drive the gluconeogenic pathway toward glucose and subsequent glycogen synthesis. It appears that fructose is a better substrate for glycogen synthesis than glucose and that glycogen replenishment takes precedence over triglyceride formation. Once liver glycogen is replenished, the intermediates of fructose metabolism are primarily directed toward triglyceride synthesis.

Metabolic conversion of fructose to glycogen in the liver

=== Synthesis of triglyceride from DHAP and glyceraldehyde 3-phosphate ===
Carbons from dietary fructose are found in both the free fatty acid and glycerol moieties of plasma triglycerides. High fructose consumption can lead to excess pyruvate production, causing a buildup of Krebs cycle intermediates. Accumulated citrate can be transported from the mitochondria into the cytosol of hepatocytes, converted to acetyl CoA by citrate lyase and directed toward fatty acid synthesis. In addition, DHAP can be converted to glycerol 3-phosphate, providing the glycerol backbone for the triglyceride molecule. Triglycerides are incorporated into very-low-density lipoproteins (VLDL), which are released from the liver destined toward peripheral tissues for storage in both fat and muscle cells.

Metabolic conversion of fructose to triglyceride in the liver

== Potential health effects ==
In 2022, the European Food Safety Authority stated that there is research evidence that fructose and other added free sugars may be associated with increased risk of several chronic diseases: the risk is moderate for obesity and dyslipidemia (more than 50%), and low for non-alcoholic fatty liver disease, type 2 diabetes (from 15% to 50%) and hypertension. EFSA further stated that clinical research did "not support a positive relationship between the intake of dietary sugars, in isocaloric exchange with other macronutrients, and any of the chronic metabolic diseases or pregnancy-related endpoints assessed" but advised "the intake of added and free sugars should be as low as possible in the context of a nutritionally adequate diet."

=== Obesity ===
Excessive consumption of sugars, including fructose, contributes to insulin resistance, obesity, elevated LDL cholesterol and triglycerides, leading to metabolic syndrome. The European Food Safety Authority (EFSA) stated in 2011 that fructose may be preferable over sucrose and glucose in sugar-sweetened foods and beverages because of its lower effect on postprandial blood sugar levels, while also noting the potential downside that "high intakes of fructose may lead to metabolic complications such as dyslipidaemia, insulin resistance, and increased visceral adiposity". The UK's Scientific Advisory Committee on Nutrition in 2015 disputed the claims of fructose causing metabolic disorders, stating that "there is insufficient evidence to demonstrate that fructose intake, at levels consumed in the normal UK diet, leads to adverse health outcomes independent of any effects related to its presence as a component of total and free sugars."

=== Cardiometabolic diseases ===
When fructose is consumed in excess as a sweetening agent in foods or beverages, it may be associated with increased risk of obesity, diabetes, and cardiovascular disorders that are part of metabolic syndrome.

=== Compared with sucrose ===
Fructose was found to increase triglycerides in type-2 but not type-1 diabetes, and moderate use of it has previously been considered acceptable as a sweetener for diabetics, possibly because it does not trigger the production of insulin by pancreatic β cells. For a 50 gram reference amount, fructose has a glycemic index of 23, compared with 100 for glucose and 60 for sucrose. Fructose is also 73% sweeter than sucrose at room temperature, allowing diabetics to use less of it per serving. Fructose consumed before a meal may reduce the glycemic response of the meal. Fructose-sweetened food and beverage products cause less of a rise in blood glucose levels than do those manufactured with either sucrose or glucose.

== See also ==
- Hereditary fructose intolerance
- Inverted sugar syrup
