= Fructose 1-phosphate =

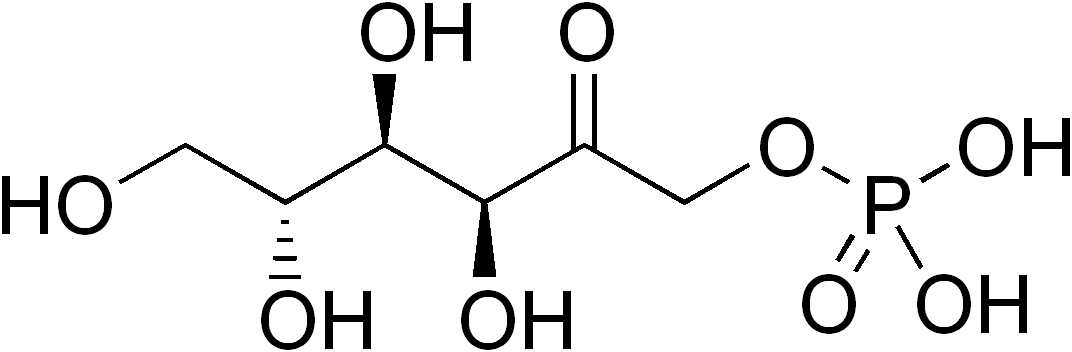

Names
- IUPAC name Fructose 1-(dihydrogen phosphate)
- Systematic IUPAC name (3S,4R,5R)-3,4,5,6-Tetrahydroxy-2-oxohexyl dihydrogen phosphate

Identifiers
CAS Number	15978-08-2
3D model (JSmol)	Interactive image
ChemSpider	58741
ECHA InfoCard	100.036.451
MeSH	Fructose-1-phosphate
PubChem CID	65246
UNII	J82727ADC8
CompTox Dashboard (EPA)	DTXSID20891553
- InChI: InChI=1S/C6H13O9P/c7-1-3(8)5(10)6(11)4(9)2-15-16(12,13)14/h3,5-8,10-11H,1-2H2,(H2,12,13,14)/t3-,5-,6-/m1/s1 Key: ZKLLSNQJRLJIGT-UYFOZJQFSA-N; InChI=1/C6H13O9P/c7-1-3(8)5(10)6(11)4(9)2-15-16(12,13)14/h3,5-8,10-11H,1-2H2,(H2,12,13,14)/t3-,5-,6-/m1/s1 Key: ZKLLSNQJRLJIGT-UYFOZJQFBV
- SMILES: O=P(O)(O)OCC(=O)[C@@H](O)[C@H](O)[C@H](O)CO

Properties
Chemical formula	C_{6}H_{13}O_{9}P
Molar mass	260.136
- Except where otherwise noted, data are given for materials in their standard state (at 25 °C [77 °F], 100 kPa). verify (what is ?) Infobox references

Fructose-1-phosphate is a derivative of fructose. It is generated mainly by hepatic fructokinase but is also generated in smaller amounts in the small intestinal mucosa and proximal epithelium of the renal tubule. It is an important intermediate of glucose metabolism. Because fructokinase has a high Vmax fructose entering cells is quickly phosphorylated to fructose 1-phosphate. In this form it is usually accumulated in the liver until it undergoes further conversion by aldolase B (the rate limiting enzyme of fructose metabolism).

Aldolase B converts it into glyceraldehyde and dihydroxyacetone phosphate (DHAP). Glyceraldehyde is then phosphorylated by triose kinase to glyceraldehyde 3-phosphate. Metabolism of fructose thus essentially results in intermediates of glycolysis. This means that fructose has the same fate as glucose after it gets metabolised. The final product of glycolysis (pyruvate) may then undergo gluconeogenesis, enter the TCA cycle or be stored as fatty acids.

== Clinical significance ==
In hereditary fructose intolerance caused by defects in aldolase B, fructose 1-phosphate accumulates in the liver and causes a number of adverse defects. Hypoglycemia results from inhibition of glycogenolysis and gluconeogenesis. It depletes intracellular phosphate reserves which leads to loss of ATP and inhibition of biosynthetic pathways. Symptoms of hereditary fructose intolerance are apathy, drowsiness, sweatiness and tremulousness.
