= Glyceraldehyde =

- Glyceraldehyde

- D-glyceraldehyde

Names
- IUPAC name Glyceraldehyde
- Systematic IUPAC name 2,3-Dihydroxypropanal d-glycero-Triose
- Other names Glyceraldehyde; Glyceric aldehyde Glyceral

Identifiers
CAS Number	56-82-6 (racemic); 453-17-8 (R); 497-09-6 (S)
3D model (JSmol)	Interactive image; Interactive image
ChemSpider	731
ECHA InfoCard	100.000.264
PubChem CID	751
UNII	DI19XSG16H (racemic); 41A680M0WB (R); GI7U82BL5A (S)
CompTox Dashboard (EPA)	DTXSID90861586
- InChI: InChI=1S/C3H6O3/c4-1-3(6)2-5/h1,3,5-6H,2H2 Key: MNQZXJOMYWMBOU-UHFFFAOYSA-N; InChI=1/C3H6O3/c4-1-3(6)2-5/h1,3,5-6H,2H2 Key: MNQZXJOMYWMBOU-UHFFFAOYAU
- SMILES: O=CC(O)CO; OCC(O)C=O

Properties
Chemical formula	C_{3}H_{6}O_{3}
Molar mass	90.078 g·mol^{−1}
Density	1.455 g/cm^{3}
Melting point	145 °C (293 °F; 418 K)
Boiling point	140 to 150 °C (284 to 302 °F; 413 to 423 K) at 0.8 mmHg
- Except where otherwise noted, data are given for materials in their standard state (at 25 °C [77 °F], 100 kPa). verify (what is ?) Infobox references

Glyceraldehyde (glyceral) is a triose monosaccharide with chemical formula C_{3}H_{6}O_{3}. It is the simplest of all common aldoses. It is a sweet, colorless, crystalline solid that is an intermediate compound in carbohydrate metabolism. The word comes from combining glycerol and aldehyde, as glyceraldehyde is glycerol with one alcohol group oxidized to an aldehyde.

== Structure ==
Glyceraldehyde has one chiral center and therefore exists as two different enantiomers with opposite optical rotation:

- In the D/L nomenclature, either D from Latin Dexter meaning "right", or L from Latin Laevo meaning "left"
- In the R/S nomenclature, either R from Latin Rectus meaning "right", or S from Latin Sinister meaning "left"

	D-glyceraldehyde (R)-glyceraldehyde (+)-glyceraldehyde	L-glyceraldehyde (S)-glyceraldehyde (−)-glyceraldehyde
Fischer projection	D-glyceraldehyde	L-glyceraldehyde
Skeletal formula	D-glyceraldehyde	L-glyceraldehyde

While the optical rotation of glyceraldehyde is (+) for R and (−) for S, this is not true for all monosaccharides. The stereochemical configuration can only be determined from the chemical structure, whereas the optical rotation can only be determined empirically (by experiment).

It was by a lucky guess that the molecular D- geometry was assigned to (+)-glyceraldehyde in the late 19th century, as confirmed by X-ray crystallography in 1951.

=== Aqueous and concentrated solutions of glyceraldehyde ===
The description above focuses on classification of isomers, but the glyceraldehyde is subject to a further complications: the tendency of hydroxy-aldehydes to exist as hydrates. NMR measurements indicate that in aqueous solution, glyceraldehyde exists in a hydrate owing to this reaction:

HOCH_{2}CH(OH)CHO + H_{2}O ⇌ HOCH_{2}CH(OH)CH(OH)_{2}

The same study indicates that concentrated ("syrupy") forms of glyceraldehyde exist as dimers, indicating hemiacetal formation.

== Nomenclature ==
In the D/L system, glyceraldehyde is used as the configurational standard for carbohydrates. Monosaccharides with an absolute configuration identical to (R)-glyceraldehyde at the last stereocentre, for example C5 in glucose, are assigned the stereo-descriptor D-. Those similar to (S)-glyceraldehyde are assigned an L-.

== Synthesis and reactions ==
Glyceraldehyde can be prepared from acetals of acrolein (CH_{2}=CHCHO) in two steps, oxidation followed by hydrolysis of the acetal. Its cyclohexylidene acetal can also be produced by oxidative cleavage of the bis(acetal) of mannitol. Glyceraldehyde can also be synthesized through the partial oxidation of Glycerol, for example with a fenton type reagent.

Glyceraldehyde is a precursor to four-carbon sugars (tetroses) via cyanation followed by hydrolysis of the cyanohydrin:

HOCH_{2}CH(OH)CH(OH)CN + 2 H_{2}O → HOCH_{2}CH(OH)CH(OH)CO_{2}H + NH_{3}
HOCH_{2}CH(OH)CH(OH)CO_{2}H + 2 H_{2} → HOCH_{2}CH(OH)CH(OH)CH_{2}OH + H_{2}O

== Biochemistry ==
The enzyme glycerol dehydrogenase (NADP^{+}) has two substrates, glycerol and NADP^{+}, and 3 products, D-glyceraldehyde, NADPH and H+.

The interconversion of the phosphates of glyceraldehyde (glyceraldehyde 3-phosphate) and dihydroxyacetone (dihydroxyacetone phosphate), catalyzed by the enzyme triosephosphate isomerase, is an intermediate step in glycolysis.

== See also ==
- Stereoisomerism
