= List of aldolases =

Unqualified, aldolase usually refers to the enzyme fructose-bisphosphate aldolase.

Aldolase may also refer to:

== Proteins serving as fructose-bisphosphate aldolase ==
- Aldolase A
- Aldolase B
- Aldolase C

== Other enzymes called "aldolases" ==
- 17a-hydroxyprogesterone aldolase
- 2-dehydro-3-deoxy-6-phosphogalactonate aldolase
- 2-dehydro-3-deoxy-D-pentonate aldolase
- 2-dehydro-3-deoxyglucarate aldolase
- 2-dehydro-3-deoxy-L-pentonate aldolase
- 2-dehydro-3-deoxy-phosphogluconate aldolase
- 2-dehydropantoate aldolase
- 3-deoxy-D-manno-octulosonate aldolase
- 4-(2-carboxyphenyl)-2-oxobut-3-enoate aldolase
- 5-dehydro-2-deoxyphosphogluconate aldolase
- Benzoin aldolase
- Deoxyribose-phosphate aldolase
- Dihydroneopterin aldolase
- Dimethylaniline-N-oxide aldolase
- Ketotetrose-phosphate aldolase
- Lactate aldolase
- L-fuculose-phosphate aldolase
- Phenylserine aldolase
- Rhamnulose-1-phosphate aldolase
- Sphinganine-1-phosphate aldolase
- Tagatose-bisphosphate aldolase
- Threonine aldolase
- Trimethylamine-oxide aldolase
