= 3-Deoxy-D-pentulosonic acid aldolase =

3-Deoxy-D-pentulosonic acid aldolase may refer to:

- 2-dehydro-3-deoxy-D-pentonate aldolase, an enzyme
- 2-dehydro-3-deoxy-L-pentonate aldolase, an enzyme
