= Alginase II =

Alginase II may refer to:

- Poly(beta-D-mannuronate) lyase, an enzyme
- Poly(alpha-L-guluronate) lyase, an enzyme
