= Isohexenylglutaconyl-CoA hydratase =

isohexenylglutaconyl-CoA hydratase

Identifiers
- EC no.: 4.2.1.57
- CAS no.: 37290-84-9

Databases
- IntEnz: IntEnz view
- BRENDA: BRENDA entry
- ExPASy: NiceZyme view
- KEGG: KEGG entry
- MetaCyc: metabolic pathway
- PRIAM: profile
- PDB structures: RCSB PDB PDBe PDBsum
- Gene Ontology: AmiGO / QuickGO
Search
- PMC: articles
- PubMed: articles
- NCBI: proteins

The enzyme isohexenylglutaconyl-CoA hydratase (EC 4.2.1.57) catalyzes the chemical reaction

3-hydroxy-3-(4-methylpent-3-en-1-yl)glutaryl-CoA $\rightleftharpoons$ 3-(4-methylpent-3-en-1-yl)pent-2-enedioyl-CoA + H_{2}O

This enzyme belongs to the family of lyases, specifically the hydro-lyases, which cleave carbon-oxygen bonds. The systematic name of this enzyme class is 3-hydroxy-3-(4-methylpent-3-en-1-yl)glutaryl-CoA hydro-lyase [3-(4-methylpent-3-en-1-yl)pent-2-enedioyl-CoA-forming]. Other names in common use include 3-hydroxy-3-isohexenylglutaryl-CoA-hydrolase, isohexenylglutaconyl coenzyme A hydratase, β-isohexenylglutaconyl-CoA-hydratase, and 3-hydroxy-3-(4-methylpent-3-en-1-yl)glutaryl-CoA hydro-lyase.
