= PRPD =

PRPD may refer to:

- 2-methylcitrate dehydratase, an enzyme
- Puerto Rico Police
