= Phosphosulfolactate synthase =

phosphosulfolactate synthase

Identifiers
- EC no.: 4.4.1.19

Databases
- IntEnz: IntEnz view
- BRENDA: BRENDA entry
- ExPASy: NiceZyme view
- KEGG: KEGG entry
- MetaCyc: metabolic pathway
- PRIAM: profile
- PDB structures: RCSB PDB PDBe PDBsum
- Gene Ontology: AmiGO / QuickGO
Search
- PMC: articles
- PubMed: articles
- NCBI: proteins

The enzyme phosphosulfolactate synthase (EC 4.4.1.19) catalyzes the reaction

(2R)-2-O-phospho-3-sulfolactate $\rightleftharpoons$ phosphoenolpyruvate + sulfite

This enzyme belongs to the family of lyases, specifically the class of carbon-sulfur lyases. The systematic name of this enzyme class is (2R)-2-O-phospho-3-sulfolactate hydrogen-sulfite-lyase (phosphoenolpyruvate-forming). Other names in common use include (2R)-phospho-3-sulfolactate synthase, and (2R)-O-phospho-3-sulfolactate sulfo-lyase.

== Structural studies ==
As of late 2007, only one structure has been solved for this class of enzymes, with the PDB accession code 1U83.
