= Indoleacetaldoxime dehydratase =

indoleacetaldoxime dehydratase

Identifiers
- EC no.: 4.99.1.6
- CAS no.: 9024-27-5

Databases
- IntEnz: IntEnz view
- BRENDA: BRENDA entry
- ExPASy: NiceZyme view
- KEGG: KEGG entry
- MetaCyc: metabolic pathway
- PRIAM: profile
- PDB structures: RCSB PDB PDBe PDBsum
- Gene Ontology: AmiGO / QuickGO
Search
- PMC: articles
- PubMed: articles
- NCBI: proteins

In enzymology, an indoleacetaldoxime dehydratase (EC 4.99.1.6) is an enzyme that catalyzes the chemical reaction

(indol-3-yl)acetaldehyde oxime $\rightleftharpoons$ (indol-3-yl)acetonitrile + H_{2}O

Hence, this enzyme has one substrate, (indol-3-yl)acetaldehyde oxime, and two products, (indol-3-yl)acetonitrile and H_{2}O.

This enzyme belongs to the family of lyases, specifically the "catch-all" class of lyases that do not fit into any other sub-class. The systematic name of this enzyme class is (indol-3-yl)acetaldehyde-oxime hydro-lyase [(indol-3-yl)acetonitrile-forming]. Other names in common use include indoleacetaldoxime hydro-lyase, 3-indoleacetaldoxime hydro-lyase, indole-3-acetaldoxime hydro-lyase, indole-3-acetaldehyde-oxime hydro-lyase, and (indol-3-yl)acetaldehyde-oxime hydro-lyase. This enzyme participates in cyanoamino acid metabolism.
