= Aldolase A deficiency =

- Other names: ALDOA deficiency, Red cell aldolase deficiency, or Glycogen storage disease type 12 (GSD XII)
- Aldolase A deficiency has an autosomal recessive pattern of inheritance
- Specialty: Endocrinology

Aldolase A deficiency is an autosomal recessive metabolic disorder resulting in a deficiency of the enzyme aldolase A; the enzyme is found predominantly in red blood cells and muscle tissue. The deficiency may lead to hemolytic anaemia as well as myopathy associated with exercise intolerance and rhabdomyolysis in some cases.

== Symptoms and signs ==
The low incidence of this syndrome is often related to aldolase A's essential glycolytic role along with its exclusive expression in blood and skeletal muscle. Early developmental reliance and constitutive function prevents severe mutation in successful embryos. Infrequent documentation thus prevents clear generalisation of symptoms and causes. However five cases have been well described. ALDOA deficiency is diagnosed through reduced aldoA enzymatic activity, however, both physiological response and fundamental causes vary.

Ethnicity	Mutation	Consanguinity	Primary symptoms
Canadian Jewish	Unknown	Yes	Dysmorphic features, Hemolytic anemia, Elevated liver glycogen, Stunted growth and development
Japanese	Unknown	Probable	Hemolytic anemia, Neonatal hyperbilirubinemia, Hepatomegaly, Splenomegaly
Japanese	386 A:G (Asp128Gly)	Probable	Hemolytic anemia, Hepatomegaly, Splenomegaly
German	619 G:A (Glu206Lys)	No	Hemolytic anemia, Rhabdomyolysis, Hyperbilirubinemia, Stunted growth and development
Sicilian	931 C:T (Arg303X),1037 G:A (Cys 338Tyr)	No	Hemolytic anemia, Pyropoikilocytosis, Hyperkalemia, Jaundice, Rhabdomyolysis, Frequent infection

=== Anemia ===
Blood-related pathology is seen in all patients. Typically diagnosed at birth, congenital nonspherocytic hemolytic anemia is characterised by premature destruction of red blood cells without apparent abnormality in shape. Erythrocyte dependency on anaerobic glycolysis for ATP homeostasis, causes perturbation of this pathway to result in disruption of cellular processes including electrostatic membrane gradients (typically maintained through transporters of high energetic demand) ultimately leading to membrane instability and lysis.

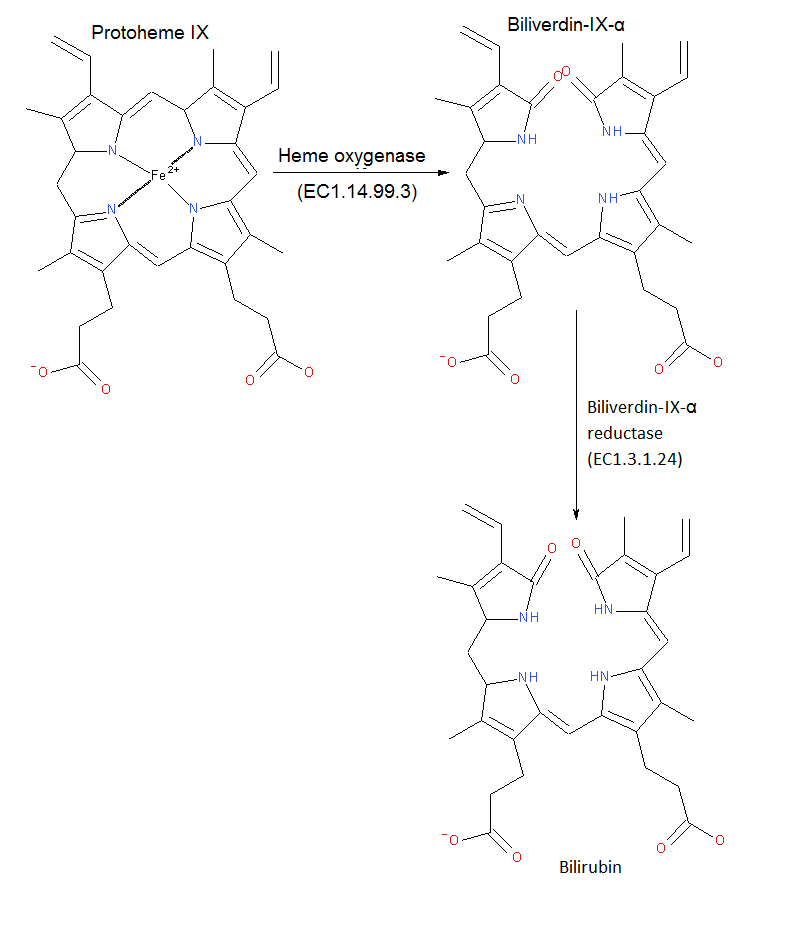
Pathway summary: heme degradation to bilirubin

This shortened erythrocyte life-span and increased destruction links to hyperbilirubinemia which often presents as jaundice in the accumulation of bilirubin through excessive hemoglobin breakdown. Another side effect of cellular rupture both in the form of hemolysis and rhabdomyolysis is excessive plasma concentrations of electrolytes such as potassium. This can lead to hyperkalemia, potentially of great cardiac concern.

Glycolysis also produces 2,3-diphosphoglycerate required to modulate hemoglobin's affinity for oxygen (2,3-bisphosphoglycerate synthesis). Thus dysregulation of glycolysis is also implicated in the functional distribution of oxygen possibly leading to organ hypoxia. A complex pattern for this metabolite is suggested with discrepancy in findings. One Japanese patient had elevated levels, while the original Jewish Canadian boy had below average concentration.

Glucose metabolism also links intrinsically to the pentose phosphate pathway in the generation of reduced nicotinamide adenine dinucleotide phosphate (NADPH) necessary for synthetic processes and reduced glutathione involved in protecting red cells against oxidant damage. In particular increased fructose-1,6-bisphosphate accumulation can have inhibitory effects on glucose-6-phosphate dehydrogenase, an essential enzyme of this pathway.

Lactate accumulation has also been noted in some patients, potentially linked to reciprocal stimulation of pyruvate kinase, a key enzyme in lactic acid fermentation.

=== Myopathy ===
In non-contiguous patients an aggravated form of aldolase A deficiency has been seen to manifest in myopathy (muscular deterioration). This is often recognized initially through signs of muscle weakness and exercise intolerance, suggesting rapid muscular fatigue and damage, likely directly related to ATP depletion. This breakdown of muscular fibers, or rhabdomyolysis, can lead to detectable blood creatine phosphate level elevation and potentially exaggerated hyperkalemia.

=== Other ===
Delayed growth and development was noted in some patients, although not fully explained, this may be generally associated with the physiological difficulties implicit in errors of energy metabolism. In particular neurological impairment was conjecturally linked with the predominant role of aldolase A in the brain during development. However, this was not substantiated with direct enzymatic kinetic study.

Elevated liver glycogen in one patent was rationalised through an accumulation of fructose-1,6-bisphosphate leading to impaired glucose metabolism and increased diversion of hexose sugars from peripheral tissues. Within the liver the aldolase C isoform is unaffected and therefore hepatic metabolism is assumed to be normally functioning and compensatory processes may be operating.

Compromised immunity has also been indicated, relating to the predominance or exclusivity of aldolase A in leukocytes. This was correlated with recurrent infection in the Sicilian case.

Focal disruption of vital energy metabolism has thus far prevented complete investigation of non-catalytic perturbation. However relation to membrane structural stability has been implicated in the concurrence of aldolase A deficiency and dominant (mild) hereditary elliptocytosis, speculatively also relating to ATP depletion.

== Causes ==
Characterised as a recessive disorder, symptomatic presentation requires the inheritance of aldolase A mutations from both parents. This conclusion is substantiated through the continuum type presentation witnessed, wherein heterozygous parents have intermediate enzyme activity. Structural instability has been indicated in four of the patients, with particular sensitivity to increased temperature according to direct enzymatic testing. This is exemplified in the early diagnosis of hereditary pyropoikilocytosis in the Sicilian girl. Deterioration with fever is likewise congruent. However, this direct relation has been disputed due to the increased overall metabolism and oxygen consumption also accompanying such maladies.

Sequence analysis has been conducted for three of the patients each revealing a distinct alteration at regions of typically high conservation. The conversion of the 128th aspartic acid to glycine causes conformational change according to CD spectral analysis and thermal lability in mutagenic analysis. Similarly the charge disruption created through the exchange of the negatively charged glutamic acid for positively charged lysine (at residue 209 of the E helix) disrupts interface interaction of the protein's subunits and therein destabilises its native tetrahedral configuration. The final case is unique in its non-homozygosity. A comparable maternal missense mutation wherein tyrosine is replaced by cysteine alters the carboxy-terminus due to its proximity to a crucial hinge structure. However, the paternal nonsense mutation at arginine 303 truncates the peptide. It is notable that Arg303 is required for enzymatic activity.

The initial 1973 case is atypical, in that no indication of aldolase A structural abnormality was found in isoelectric focusing, heat stabilization, electrophoresis or enzyme kinetics. It was concluded that either disordered regulation or a basic defect creating more rapid tetrameric inactivation were the most probable causes.

== History ==
The first recorded case of Aldolase A deficiency was described in 1973 (Beutler et al.) of a Jewish Canadian boy of Romanian descent. As his parents were first cousins, the presentation of dysmorphic features is conjecturally linked to confounding homozygosity at additional recessive loci. Inborn errors of metabolism are not typically associated with malformation and subsequent cases have lacked such physical manifestations. In particular this leads to a complication for clearly delineating the effects of enzymatic aldolase-A deficiency.

The two familial male patients reported in 1981 (having been born in 1967 and 1979) were from a small Japanese island indicating a similar possibility of consanguinity. However, unlike in the primary instance parental aldolase activity was also partially reduced without significant physiological ailment.

The other two cases documented in 1996 and 2004 lacked evidence for contiguity and deviated from previous findings in demonstration of additional myopathic complaints. The former boy's parents' and brother's aldolase activity's were half that of normal control values. The Sicilian girl's mother had benign hereditary elliptocytosis, a dominant condition resulting in elongated erythrocytes, which was passed on to her. However, her father's blood count and smear produced normal findings.
