= 4-(2-carboxyphenyl)-2-oxobut-3-enoate aldolase =

Class of enzymes

Identifiers
- EC no.: 4.1.2.34
- CAS no.: 86611-90-7

Databases
- IntEnz: IntEnz view
- BRENDA: BRENDA entry
- ExPASy: NiceZyme view
- KEGG: KEGG entry
- MetaCyc: metabolic pathway
- PRIAM: profile
- PDB structures: RCSB PDB PDBe PDBsum
- Gene Ontology: AmiGO / QuickGO
Search
- PMC: articles
- PubMed: articles
- NCBI: proteins

The enzyme 4-(2-carboxyphenyl)-2-oxobut-3-enoate aldolase (EC 4.1.2.34) catalyzes the chemical reaction

(3Z)-4-(2-carboxyphenyl)-2-oxobut-3-enoic acid
H_{2}O
2-Carboxybenzaldehyde
+
Pyruvic acid

This enzyme participates in phenanthrene degradation. Its substrate is produced from 1-hydroxy-2-naphthoic acid by the enzyme 1-hydroxy-2-naphthoate 1,2-dioxygenase.

== Nomenclature ==
This enzyme belongs to the family of lyases, specifically the aldehyde-lyases, which cleave carbon-carbon bonds. The systematic name of this enzyme class is (3Z)-4-(2-carboxyphenyl)-2-oxobut-3-enoate 2-formylbenzoate-lyase (pyruvate-forming). Other names in common use include 2'-carboxybenzalpyruvate aldolase, (3E)-4-(2-carboxyphenyl)-2-oxobut-3-enoate, 2-carboxybenzaldehyde-lyase, and (3Z)-4-(2-carboxyphenyl)-2-oxobut-3-enoate 2-formylbenzoate-lyase.
