= Arrestin beta 2 =

Protein found in humans

ARRB2

Identifiers
- Aliases: ARRB2, ARB2, ARR2, BARR2, Arrestin beta 2
- External IDs: OMIM: 107941; MGI: 99474; GeneCards: ARRB2

Gene location (Human)
Chr.	Chromosome 17 (human)
Band	17p13.2	Start	4,710,596 bp
Band	17p13.2	End	4,721,499 bp

Gene location (Mouse)
Chr.	Chromosome 11 (mouse)
Band	11 B3|11 42.99 cM	Start	70,323,461 bp
Band	11 B3|11 42.99 cM	End	70,331,654 bp
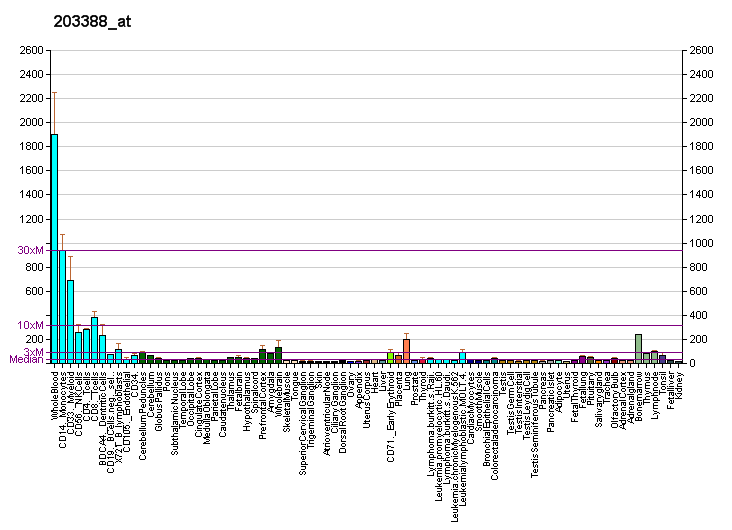
RNA expression pattern
Bgee	Human / Mouse (ortholog); Top expressed in: granulocyte; monocyte; right lung; spleen; right hemisphere of cerebellum; upper lobe of left lung; blood; bone marrow cell; right frontal lobe; C1 segment / Top expressed in: granulocyte; tibiofemoral joint; thymus; dentate gyrus of hippocampal formation granule cell; stroma of bone marrow; lymph node; blood; spleen; mesenteric lymph nodes; neural layer of retina; More reference expression data
BioGPS	More reference expression data
Gene ontology
Molecular function	alpha-1B adrenergic receptor binding; 14-3-3 protein binding; protein kinase B binding; protein binding; enzyme binding; angiotensin receptor binding; molecular adaptor activity; signaling receptor binding; G protein-coupled receptor binding; ubiquitin protein ligase binding; identical protein binding; arrestin family protein binding; protein-containing complex binding; protein domain specific binding; alpha-1A adrenergic receptor binding; type 1 angiotensin receptor binding; D1 dopamine receptor binding; follicle-stimulating hormone receptor binding; type 2A serotonin receptor binding; platelet activating factor receptor binding; mitogen-activated protein kinase binding
Cellular component	cytoplasm; cytosol; postsynaptic membrane; postsynaptic density; membrane; plasma membrane; endocytic vesicle; dendritic spine; intracellular anatomical structure; basolateral plasma membrane; clathrin-coated pit; cytoplasmic vesicle; nucleus; intracellular membrane-bounded organelle; endosome
Biological process	proteasome-mediated ubiquitin-dependent protein catabolic process; positive regulation of calcium ion transport; regulation of protein phosphorylation; negative regulation of interleukin-1 beta production; negative regulation of protein kinase B signaling; negative regulation of cysteine-type endopeptidase activity involved in apoptotic process; positive regulation of protein kinase B signaling; positive regulation of protein phosphorylation; endocytosis; regulation of G protein-coupled receptor signaling pathway; positive regulation of receptor internalization; negative regulation of release of cytochrome c from mitochondria; negative regulation of interleukin-6 production; receptor internalization; transcription by RNA polymerase II; positive regulation of peptidyl-serine phosphorylation; detection of temperature stimulus involved in sensory perception of pain; follicle-stimulating hormone signaling pathway; platelet activation; dopamine receptor signaling pathway; negative regulation of protein ubiquitination; brain development; negative regulation of GTPase activity; negative regulation of toll-like receptor signaling pathway; protein ubiquitination; positive regulation of DNA biosynthetic process; positive regulation of ERK1 and ERK2 cascade; positive regulation of peptidyl-tyrosine phosphorylation; cell chemotaxis; protein transport; negative regulation of natural killer cell mediated cytotoxicity; regulation of androgen receptor signaling pathway; positive regulation of synaptic transmission, dopaminergic; negative regulation of tumor necrosis factor production; negative regulation of signal transduction; positive regulation of protein ubiquitination; transforming growth factor beta receptor signaling pathway; negative regulation of NF-kappaB transcription factor activity; negative regulation of smooth muscle cell apoptotic process; desensitization of G protein-coupled receptor signaling pathway by arrestin; signal transduction; adult walking behavior; negative regulation of interleukin-12 production; Wnt signaling pathway, planar cell polarity pathway; negative regulation of protein phosphorylation; G protein-coupled receptor internalization; positive regulation of gene expression; protein deubiquitination; membrane organization; positive regulation of cardiac muscle cell differentiation; G protein-coupled receptor signaling pathway; excitatory postsynaptic potential; positive regulation of collagen biosynthetic process; negative regulation of neuron apoptotic process; positive regulation of epithelial cell apoptotic process
Sources:Amigo / QuickGO
Orthologs
Databases	NCBI: entry; OMA: entry
Species	Human	Mouse
Entrez	409	216869
Ensembl	ENSG00000141480	ENSMUSG00000060216
UniProt	P32121	Q91YI4
RefSeq (mRNA)	NM_001257328; NM_001257329; NM_001257330; NM_001257331; NM_004313 NM_199004; NM_001330064	NM_001271358; NM_001271359; NM_001271360; NM_145429
RefSeq (protein)	NP_001244257; NP_001244258; NP_001244259; NP_001244260; NP_001316993 NP_004304; NP_945355	NP_001258287; NP_001258288; NP_001258289; NP_663404
Location (UCSC)	Chr 17: 4.71 – 4.72 Mb	Chr 11: 70.32 – 70.33 Mb
PubMed search
- Wikidata
View/Edit Human	View/Edit Mouse

Beta-arrestin-2, or β-arrestin2, also known as arrestin beta-2, is an intracellular protein that in humans is encoded by the ARRB2 gene.

Members of arrestin/beta-arrestin protein family are thought to participate in agonist-mediated desensitization of G protein-coupled receptors and cause specific dampening of cellular responses to stimuli such as hormones, neurotransmitters, or sensory signals, as well as having signalling roles in their own right. Arrestin beta 2, like arrestin beta 1, was shown to inhibit beta-adrenergic receptor function in vitro. It is expressed at high levels in the central nervous system and may play a role in the regulation of synaptic receptors. Besides the brain, a cDNA for arrestin beta 2 was isolated from thyroid gland, and thus it may also be involved in hormone-specific desensitization of TSH receptors. Multiple alternatively spliced transcript variants have been found for this gene, but the full-length nature of some variants has not been defined.

The protein may interact with the agonist DOI in 5-HT_{2A} receptor signaling.

Arrestin beta 2 is crucial for the development of tolerance to morphine and other opioids.

== Interactions ==
Arrestin beta 2 has been shown to interact with

- AP2B1,
- PSCD2,
- Mdm2, and
- RALGDS.
