= Arylmalonate decarboxylase =

Class of enzymes

arylmalonate decarboxylase

Identifiers
- EC no.: 4.1.1.76
- CAS no.: 144713-36-0

Databases
- IntEnz: IntEnz view
- BRENDA: BRENDA entry
- ExPASy: NiceZyme view
- KEGG: KEGG entry
- MetaCyc: metabolic pathway
- PRIAM: profile
- PDB structures: RCSB PDB PDBe PDBsum
- Gene Ontology: AmiGO / QuickGO
Search
- PMC: articles
- PubMed: articles
- NCBI: proteins

The enzyme arylmalonate decarboxylase (EC 4.1.1.76) catalyzes the chemical reaction

2-aryl-2-methylmalonate $\rightleftharpoons$ 2-arylpropanoate + CO_{2}

This enzyme belongs to the family of lyases, specifically the carboxy-lyases, which cleave carbon-carbon bonds. The systematic name of this enzyme class is 2-aryl-2-methylmalonate carboxy-lyase (2-arylpropanoate-forming). Other names in common use include AMDASE, 2-aryl-2-methylmalonate carboxy-lyase, and 2-aryl-2-methylmalonate carboxy-lyase (2-arylpropionate-forming).

== Structural studies ==
As of late 2007, only one structure has been solved for this class of enzymes, with the PDB accession code 2DGD.
