= Hydroperoxide dehydratase =

hydroperoxide dehydratase

Identifiers
- EC no.: 4.2.1.92

Databases
- IntEnz: IntEnz view
- BRENDA: BRENDA entry
- ExPASy: NiceZyme view
- KEGG: KEGG entry
- MetaCyc: metabolic pathway
- PRIAM: profile
- PDB structures: RCSB PDB PDBe PDBsum
- Gene Ontology: AmiGO / QuickGO
Search
- PMC: articles
- PubMed: articles
- NCBI: proteins

The enzyme hydroperoxide dehydratase (EC 4.2.1.92) catalyzes the chemical reaction

(9Z,11E,14Z)-(13S)-hydroperoxyoctadeca-9,11,14-trienoate $\rightleftharpoons$ (9Z)-(13S)-12,13-epoxyoctadeca-9,11-dienoate + H_{2}O

This enzyme belongs to the family of lyases, specifically the hydro-lyases, which cleave carbon-oxygen bonds. The systematic name of this enzyme class is (9Z,11E,14Z)-(13S)-hydroperoxyoctadeca-9,11,14-trienoate 12,13-hydro-lyase [(9Z)-(13S)-12,13-epoxyoctadeca-9,11-dienoate-forming]. Other names in common use include hydroperoxide isomerase, linoleate hydroperoxide isomerase, linoleic acid hydroperoxide isomerase, HPI, (9Z,11E,14Z)-(13S)-hydroperoxyoctadeca-9,11,14-trienoate, and 12,13-hydro-lyase.

== Structural studies ==
As of late 2007, only one structure has been solved for this class of enzymes, with the PDB accession code 1U5U.
