= Glucuronan lyase =

Identifiers
- EC no.: 4.2.2.14

Databases
- IntEnz: IntEnz view
- BRENDA: BRENDA entry
- ExPASy: NiceZyme view
- KEGG: KEGG entry
- MetaCyc: metabolic pathway
- PRIAM: profile
- PDB structures: RCSB PDB PDBe PDBsum
Search
- PMC: articles
- PubMed: articles
- NCBI: proteins

The enzyme glucuronan lyase (EC 4.2.2.14) catalyzes the following process:

Eliminative cleavage of (1→4)-β-D-glucuronans to give oligosaccharides with 4-deoxy-β-D-gluc-4-enuronosyl groups at their non-reducing ends. Complete degradation of glucuronans results in the formation of tetrasaccharides.

This enzyme belongs to the family of lyases, specifically those carbon-oxygen lyases acting on polysaccharides. The systematic name of this enzyme class is (1→4)-β-D-glucuronan lyase. This enzyme is also called (1,4)-β-D-glucuronan lyase.
