= Inulin fructotransferase (DFA-I-forming) =

Identifiers
- EC no.: 4.2.2.17
- CAS no.: 125008-19-7

Databases
- IntEnz: IntEnz view
- BRENDA: BRENDA entry
- ExPASy: NiceZyme view
- KEGG: KEGG entry
- MetaCyc: metabolic pathway
- PRIAM: profile
- PDB structures: RCSB PDB PDBe PDBsum
Search
- PMC: articles
- PubMed: articles
- NCBI: proteins

The enzyme inulin fructotransferase (DFA-I-forming) (EC 4.2.2.17) catalyzes the following process:

Produces α-D-fructofuranose β-D-fructofuranose 1,2′:2,1′-dianhydride (DFA I) by successively eliminating the diminishing (2→1)-β-D-fructan (inulin) chain from the terminal D-fructosyl-D-fructosyl disaccharide.

This enzyme belongs to the family of lyases, specifically those carbon-oxygen lyases acting on polysaccharides. The systematic name of this enzyme class is (2→1)-β-D-fructan lyase (α-Dfructofuranose-β-D-fructofuranose-1,2′:2,1′-dianhydride-forming). Other names in common use include inulin fructotransferase (DFA-I-producing), inulin fructotransferase (depolymerizing,, difructofuranose-1,2':2',1-dianhydride-forming), inulin D-fructosyl-D-fructosyltransferase, (1,2':1',2-dianhydride-forming), inulin D-fructosyl-D-fructosyltransferase (forming, and α-D-fructofuranose β-D-fructofuranose 1,2':1',2-dianhydride).
