= Fucosterol-epoxide lyase =

fucosterol-epoxide lyase

Identifiers
- EC no.: 4.1.2.33
- CAS no.: 99676-42-3

Databases
- IntEnz: IntEnz view
- BRENDA: BRENDA entry
- ExPASy: NiceZyme view
- KEGG: KEGG entry
- MetaCyc: metabolic pathway
- PRIAM: profile
- PDB structures: RCSB PDB PDBe PDBsum
- Gene Ontology: AmiGO / QuickGO
Search
- PMC: articles
- PubMed: articles
- NCBI: proteins

The enzyme fucosterol-epoxide lyase (EC 4.1.2.33) catalyzes the chemical reaction

(24R,24′R)-fucosterol epoxide $\rightleftharpoons$ desmosterol + acetaldehyde

This enzyme belongs to the family of lyases, specifically the aldehyde-lyases, which cleave carbon-carbon bonds. The systematic name of this enzyme class is (24R,24'R)-fucosterol-epoxide acetaldehyde-lyase (desmosterol-forming). This enzyme is also called (24R,24'R)-fucosterol-epoxide acetaldehyde-lyase.
