= Bile-acid 7alpha-dehydratase =

Bile-acid 7α-dehydratase

Identifiers
- EC no.: 4.2.1.106

Databases
- IntEnz: IntEnz view
- BRENDA: BRENDA entry
- ExPASy: NiceZyme view
- KEGG: KEGG entry
- MetaCyc: metabolic pathway
- PRIAM: profile
- PDB structures: RCSB PDB PDBe PDBsum
Search
- PMC: articles
- PubMed: articles
- NCBI: proteins

The enzyme bile-acid 7α-dehydratase (EC 4.2.1.106) catalyzes the chemical reaction

7α,12α-dihydroxy-3-oxochol-4-enoate $\rightleftharpoons$ 12α-hydroxy-3-oxochola-4,6-dienoate + H_{2}O

This enzyme belongs to the family of lyases, specifically the hydro-lyases, which cleave carbon-oxygen bonds. The systematic name of this enzyme class is 7α,12α-dihydroxy-3-oxochol-4-enoate hydro-lyase (12α-hydroxy-3-oxochola-4,6-dienoate-forming). This enzyme is also called 7α,12α-dihydroxy-3-oxochol-4-enoate hydro-lyase.
