= 3-ketovalidoxylamine C-N-lyase =

Enzyme

Identifiers
- EC no.: 4.3.3.1
- CAS no.: 99889-98-2

Databases
- IntEnz: IntEnz view
- BRENDA: BRENDA entry
- ExPASy: NiceZyme view
- KEGG: KEGG entry
- MetaCyc: metabolic pathway
- PRIAM: profile
- PDB structures: RCSB PDB PDBe PDBsum
- Gene Ontology: AmiGO / QuickGO
Search
- PMC: articles
- PubMed: articles
- NCBI: proteins

The enzyme 3-ketovalidoxylamine C-N-lyase (EC 4.3.3.1) catalyzes the chemical reaction

4-nitrophenyl-3-ketovalidamine $\rightleftharpoons$ 4-nitroaniline + 5-D-(5/6)-5-C-(hydroxymethyl)-2,6-dihydroxycyclohex-2-en-1-one

This enzyme belongs to the family of lyases, specifically amine lyases, which cleave carbon-nitrogen bonds. The systematic name of this enzyme class is 4-nitrophenyl-3-ketovalidamine 4-nitroaniline-lyase [5-D-(5/6)-5-C-(hydroxymethyl)-2,6-dihydroxycyclohex-2-en-1-one-forming]. Other names in common use include 3-ketovalidoxylamine A C-N-lyase, p-nitrophenyl-3-ketovalidamine p-nitroaniline lyase, and 4-nitrophenyl-3-ketovalidamine 4-nitroaniline-lyase. It employs one cofactor, Ca^{2+}.
