= Deacetylipecoside synthase =

deacetylipecoside synthase

Identifiers
- EC no.: 4.3.3.4

Databases
- IntEnz: IntEnz view
- BRENDA: BRENDA entry
- ExPASy: NiceZyme view
- KEGG: KEGG entry
- MetaCyc: metabolic pathway
- PRIAM: profile
- PDB structures: RCSB PDB PDBe PDBsum
- Gene Ontology: AmiGO / QuickGO
Search
- PMC: articles
- PubMed: articles
- NCBI: proteins

The enzyme deacetylipecoside synthase (EC 4.3.3.4) catalyzes the chemical reaction

deacetylipecoside + H_{2}O $\rightleftharpoons$ dopamine + secologanin

This enzyme belongs to the family of lyases, specifically amine lyases, which cleave carbon-nitrogen bonds. The systematic name of this enzyme class is deacetylipecoside dopamine-lyase (secologanin-forming). This enzyme is also called deacetylipecoside dopamine-lyase. It participates in indole and ipecac alkaloid biosynthesis.
