= Anhydrosialidase =

Identifiers
- EC no.: 4.2.2.15
- CAS no.: 157857-11-9

Databases
- IntEnz: IntEnz view
- BRENDA: BRENDA entry
- ExPASy: NiceZyme view
- KEGG: KEGG entry
- MetaCyc: metabolic pathway
- PRIAM: profile
- PDB structures: RCSB PDB PDBe PDBsum
Search
- PMC: articles
- PubMed: articles
- NCBI: proteins

The enzyme anhydrosialidase (EC 4.2.2.15) catalyzes the following process:

Elimination of α-sialyl groups in N-acetylneuraminic acid glycosides, releasing 2,7-anhydro-α-N-acetylneuraminate

This enzyme belongs to the family of lyases, specifically those carbon-oxygen lyases acting on polysaccharides. The systematic name of this enzyme class is glycoconjugate sialyl-lyase (2,7-cyclizing). Other names in common use include anhydroneuraminidase, sialglycoconjugate N-acylneuraminylhydrolase (2,7-cyclizing), and sialidase L.
