= Peptidylamidoglycolate lyase =

peptidylamidoglycolate lyase

Identifiers
- EC no.: 4.3.2.5
- CAS no.: 131689-50-4

Databases
- IntEnz: IntEnz view
- BRENDA: BRENDA entry
- ExPASy: NiceZyme view
- KEGG: KEGG entry
- MetaCyc: metabolic pathway
- PRIAM: profile
- PDB structures: RCSB PDB PDBe PDBsum
- Gene Ontology: AmiGO / QuickGO
Search
- PMC: articles
- PubMed: articles
- NCBI: proteins

The enzyme peptidylamidoglycolate lyase (EC 4.3.2.5) catalyzes the chemical reaction

[peptide]-(2S)-2-hydroxyglycine = [peptide]-amide + glyoxylate

This enzyme belongs to the family of lyases, specifically amidine lyases. The systematic name of this enzyme class is [peptide]-(2S)-2-hydroxyglycine peptidyl-amide-lyase (glyoxylate-forming). Other names in common use include α-hydroxyglycine amidating dealkylase, peptidyl-α-hydroxyglycine α-amidating lyase, HGAD, PGL, PAL, and peptidylamidoglycolate peptidylamide-lyase.
