= Dimethylmaleate hydratase =

Class of enzymes

dimethylmaleate hydratase

Identifiers
- EC no.: 4.2.1.85
- CAS no.: 93229-56-2

Databases
- IntEnz: IntEnz view
- BRENDA: BRENDA entry
- ExPASy: NiceZyme view
- KEGG: KEGG entry
- MetaCyc: metabolic pathway
- PRIAM: profile
- PDB structures: RCSB PDB PDBe PDBsum
- Gene Ontology: AmiGO / QuickGO
Search
- PMC: articles
- PubMed: articles
- NCBI: proteins

The enzyme dimethylmaleate hydratase (EC 4.2.1.85) catalyzes the chemical reaction

(2R,3S)-2,3-dimethylmalate $\rightleftharpoons$ dimethylmaleate + H_{2}O

This enzyme belongs to the family of lyases, specifically the hydro-lyases, which cleave carbon-oxygen bonds. The systematic name of this enzyme class is (2R,3S)-2,3-dimethylmalate hydro-lyase (dimethylmaleate-forming). This enzyme is also called (2R,3S)-2,3-dimethylmalate hydro-lyase. This enzyme participates in c5-branched dibasic acid metabolism. It employs one cofactor, iron.
