= Maleate hydratase =

maleate hydratase

Identifiers
- EC no.: 4.2.1.31
- CAS no.: 37290-71-4

Databases
- IntEnz: IntEnz view
- BRENDA: BRENDA entry
- ExPASy: NiceZyme view
- KEGG: KEGG entry
- MetaCyc: metabolic pathway
- PRIAM: profile
- PDB structures: RCSB PDB PDBe PDBsum
- Gene Ontology: AmiGO / QuickGO
Search
- PMC: articles
- PubMed: articles
- NCBI: proteins

The enzyme maleate hydratase (EC 4.2.1.31) catalyzes the chemical reaction

(R)-malate $\rightleftharpoons$ maleate + H_{2}O

This enzyme belongs to the family of lyases, specifically the hydro-lyases, which cleave carbon-oxygen bonds. The systematic name of this enzyme class is (R)-malate hydro-lyase (maleate-forming). Other names in common use include D-malate hydro-lyase, malease, and (R)-malate hydro-lyase. This enzyme participates in butanoate metabolism.
