= Citrate dehydratase =

citrate dehydratase

Identifiers
- EC no.: 4.2.1.4
- CAS no.: 9024-39-9

Databases
- IntEnz: IntEnz view
- BRENDA: BRENDA entry
- ExPASy: NiceZyme view
- KEGG: KEGG entry
- MetaCyc: metabolic pathway
- PRIAM: profile
- PDB structures: RCSB PDB PDBe PDBsum
- Gene Ontology: AmiGO / QuickGO
Search
- PMC: articles
- PubMed: articles
- NCBI: proteins

In enzymology, a citrate dehydratase (EC 4.2.1.4) is an enzyme that catalyzes the chemical reaction

citrate $\rightleftharpoons$ cis-aconitate + H_{2}O

Hence, this enzyme has one substrate, citrate, and two products, cis-aconitate and H_{2}O.

This enzyme belongs to the family of lyases, specifically the hydro-lyases, which cleave carbon-oxygen bonds. The systematic name of this enzyme class is citrate hydro-lyase (cis-aconitate-forming). This enzyme is also called citrate hydro-lyase.
