= KDPG-aldolase RNA motif =

KDPG-aldolase
- Consensus secondary structure and sequence conservation of KDPG-aldolase RNA

Identifiers
- Symbol: KDPG-aldolase
- Rfam: RF03115

Other data
- RNA type: Gene; sRNA
- SO: SO:0001263
- PDB structures: PDBe

The KDPG-aldolase RNA motif is a conserved RNA structure that was discovered by bioinformatics. KDPG-aldolase motifs are found in Enterobacteriaceae, but is not known to be bpresent in Escherichia coli.

It is ambiguous whether KDPG-aldolase RNAs function as cis-regulatory elements or whether they operate in trans. KDPG-aldolase RNAs appear to be in the 5′ untranslated regions of enterobacterial genes that are annotated as encoding aldolases of 2-keto-3-deoxy-6-phosphogluconate or 2-keto-4-hydroxyglutarate.
