= Cyanide hydratase =

Type of enzyme

cyanide hydratase

Identifiers
- EC no.: 4.2.1.66
- CAS no.: 37292-83-4

Databases
- IntEnz: IntEnz view
- BRENDA: BRENDA entry
- ExPASy: NiceZyme view
- KEGG: KEGG entry
- MetaCyc: metabolic pathway
- PRIAM: profile
- PDB structures: RCSB PDB PDBe PDBsum
- Gene Ontology: AmiGO / QuickGO
Search
- PMC: articles
- PubMed: articles
- NCBI: proteins

The enzyme cyanide hydratase (EC 4.2.1.66) catalyzes the chemical reaction

formamide $\rightleftharpoons$ cyanide + H_{2}O

This enzyme belongs to the family of lyases, specifically the hydro-lyases, which cleave carbon-oxygen bonds. The systematic name of this enzyme class is formamide hydro-lyase (cyanide-forming). Other names in common use include formamide dehydratase, and formamide hydro-lyase. This enzyme participates in cyanoamino acid metabolism.
