= 2-dehydro-3-deoxy-6-phosphogalactonate aldolase =

Class of enzymes

Identifiers
- EC no.: 4.1.2.21
- CAS no.: 9030-99-3

Databases
- IntEnz: IntEnz view
- BRENDA: BRENDA entry
- ExPASy: NiceZyme view
- KEGG: KEGG entry
- MetaCyc: metabolic pathway
- PRIAM: profile
- PDB structures: RCSB PDB PDBe PDBsum
- Gene Ontology: AmiGO / QuickGO
Search
- PMC: articles
- PubMed: articles
- NCBI: proteins

The enzyme 2-dehydro-3-deoxy-6-phosphogalactonate aldolase (EC 4.1.2.21) catalyzes the chemical reaction

2-dehydro-3-deoxy-D-galactonate 6-phosphate $\rightleftharpoons$ pyruvate + D-glyceraldehyde 3-phosphate

This enzyme belongs to the family of lyases, specifically the aldehyde-lyases, which cleave carbon-carbon bonds. The systematic name of this enzyme class is 2-dehydro-3-deoxy-D-galactonate-6-phosphate D-glyceraldehyde-3-phosphate-lyase (pyruvate-forming). Other names in common use include 6-phospho-2-keto-3-deoxygalactonate aldolase, phospho-2-keto-3-deoxygalactonate aldolase, 2-keto-3-deoxy-6-phosphogalactonic aldolase, phospho-2-keto-3-deoxygalactonic aldolase, 2-keto-3-deoxy-6-phosphogalactonic acid aldolase, (KDPGal)aldolase, 2-dehydro-3-deoxy-D-galactonate-6-phosphate, and D-glyceraldehyde-3-phosphate-lyase. This enzyme participates in galactose metabolism.

== Structural studies ==
As of late 2007, two structures have been solved for this class of enzymes, with PDB accession codes 2V81 and 2V82.
