= Mannuronate-specific alginate lyase =

mannuronate-specific alginate lyase

Identifiers
- EC no.: 4.2.2.3
- CAS no.: 9024-15-1

Databases
- BRENDA: enzyme data
- ExPASy: NiceZyme view
- KEGG: enzyme entry
- MetaCyc: metabolic pathway
- Rhea: reactions
- PDB structures: RCSB PDB PDBe PDBsum
- Gene Ontology: AmiGO / QuickGO
Search
- PMC: articles
- PubMed: articles
- NCBI: proteins

Alginate_lyase2
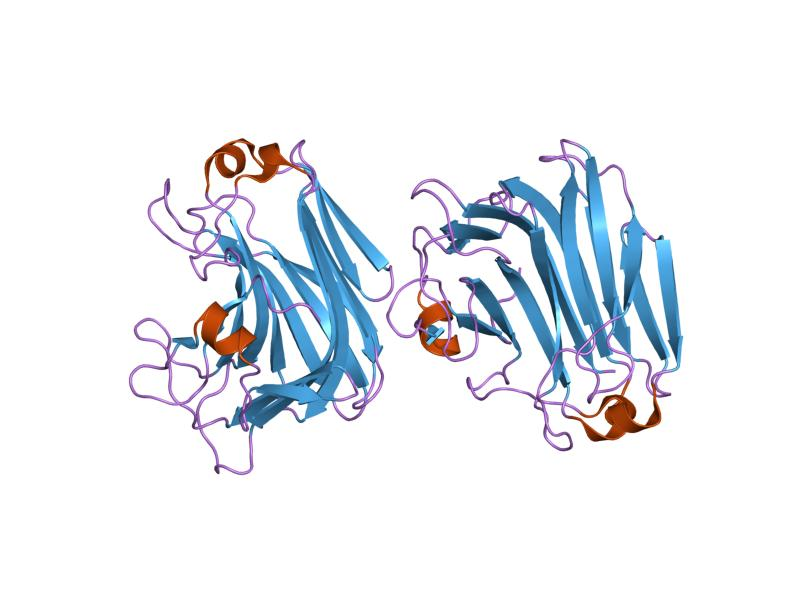
- crystal structure of alginate lyase pa1167 from pseudomonas aeruginosa at 2.0 a resolution

Identifiers
- Symbol: Alginate_lyase2
- Pfam: PF08787
- InterPro: IPR014895
- SCOP2: 1uai / SCOPe / SUPFAM
Available protein structures:
- PDB: IPR014895 PF08787 (ECOD; PDBsum)
- AlphaFold: IPR014895; PF08787

Alginate_lyase

Identifiers
- Symbol: Alginate_lyase
- Pfam: PF05426
- SCOP2: 1uai / SCOPe / SUPFAM
Available protein structures:
- PDB: PF05426 (ECOD; PDBsum)
- AlphaFold: PF05426

The enzyme mannuronate-specific alginate lyase (EC 4.2.2.3, formerly called poly(β-D-mannuronate) lyase) catalyzes the degradation of alginate into various monosaccharide and polysaccharide products:

Eliminative cleavage of alginate to give oligosaccharides with 4-deoxy-α-L-erythro-hex-4-enuronosyl groups at their non-reducing ends and β-D-mannuronate at their reducing end.

Alginate lyase cleaves the glycosidic bonds of alginate via a β-elimination mechanism, in which it first converts alginate into several oligosaccharides containing unsaturated uronic acids at their non-reducing ends. It then cleaves the oligosaccharides, forming 4-deosy-L-erythro-5-hexoseulose uronic acid.

This enzyme belongs to the family of lyases, specifically those carbon-oxygen lyases acting on polysaccharides. The systematic name of this enzyme class is alginate β-D-mannuronate—uronate lyase. Other names in common use include alginate lyase I, alginate lyase, alginase I, alginase II, and alginase. This enzyme participates in fructose and mannose metabolism.

== Substrate specificity ==
Alginate is a linear polysaccharide that has been isolated from a variety of organisms, ranging from viruses and bacteria to fungi. It is also a major component of the cell wall in brown algae and a major source of fixed carbon for other organisms. Many organisms from which alginate lyase has been isolated are found in close association with brown algae. For example, some strains of bacteria from the Paenibacillus genus were isolated from L. japonica and S. siliquatrum, and these strains were discovered to excrete alginate lyase.

While all alginate lyases have similar function, there are some variations in the type of product they form. This variation depends on the substrate specificity of the enzyme, as alginates can have M-M, G-G, or alternating M-G bonds. Therefore, some alginate lyases are G block specific, only degrading the homo-polymeric G blocks of alginate, and others are M block-specific, only degrading the homo-polymeric M blocks of alginate. Some are able to degrade both, but they may preferentially degrade one over the other. Alginate lyases can also be categorized based on their modes of action. Many are endolytic, generally allowing them to degrade alginate into unsaturated oligosaccharides. An exolytic mode of action, on the other hand, allows the enzyme to degrade alginate into monosaccharides.

== Structure ==
As of late 2019, 15 structures have been solved for this class of enzymes, with PDB accession codes PDB: 1HV6, PDB: 1J1T, PDB: 2CWS, 1VAV, 1UAI, 4OZX, 37PY, 4BE3, 3GNE, 5GMT, 1QAZ, 4OZV, 380O, 4NEI, and 5GKD.

Alginate lyases can be categorized into different polysaccharide lyase families based on their amino acid sequences. There are 24 families, ranging from Pl-1 to PL-24, but alginate lyases are generally only found in seven: PL-5, PL-6, PL-7, PL-14, PL-17, and PL-18. The structure and amino acid sequence can help elucidate the activity of the enzyme, indicating whether it is endolytic or exolytic. Endolytic alginate lyases, like those found in the PL-7 family, have active sites which are wide open. Exolytic alginate lyases, like those found in the PL-15 family, have a catalytic groove which is blocked on one end, forming a pocket.

Due to differences in the way they fold, alginate lyases can be grouped based on whether they contain a β-jelly roll, an (α/α)n toroid, or a right-handed β-helix. Most of the currently characterized alginate lyases belong to the β-jelly roll class, in which a curved anti-parallel inner and an outer β-sheet are bonded together. The inner sheet of the β-jelly roll contains the active site. Lyases with these folds tend to belong to the PL-7, PL-14, and PL-18 families.

The (α/α)n toroid class contains a barrel-shaped catalytic domain which is composed of between three and seven counterclockwise helical hairpins. These hairpins are formed by various anti-parallel α-helices. Four of the currently characterized alginate lyase structures belong to this class. The enzymes in this class typically belong to the PL-5, PL-15, and PL-17 families.

There is only one known alginate lyase in the β-helix class: AlyGC. This enzyme is exolytic and G block specific, and it is a representative alginate lyase from the PL-6 family. The N and C terminus of AlyGC form right-handed β-helix folds, which is uncommon among polysaccharide lyases. Three β-sheets comprise each fold. These sheets are designated PB1-PB3, and the twists in between each sheet are named T1-T3, with T1 coming after PB1, T2 coming after PB2, and so on. The active site is located on the N-terminus, where it is encircled by a C-terminal loop, as well as N-terminal loops and N-terminal β-strands. The cleft at the center of the active site is blocked on one end and open on the other, giving AlyGC its exolytic properties. There is a Ca^{2+} at the center of the active site, which aids in the β-elimination mechanism by neutralizing the alginate's carboxylic group at the +1 subsite of the residue.

== Applications ==
=== Cystic Fibrosis ===
Alginate is a major component in the biofilms formed during mucoid P. aeruginosa infections. Alginate lyase is able to disrupt P. aeruginosa biofilm formation by degrading the alginate in the biofilm matrix, dislodging the bacteria from surfaces and allowing for more effective antibiotic use.
