= 5-dehydro-2-deoxyphosphogluconate aldolase =

Class of enzymes

Identifiers
- EC no.: 4.1.2.29
- CAS no.: 62213-25-6

Databases
- IntEnz: IntEnz view
- BRENDA: BRENDA entry
- ExPASy: NiceZyme view
- KEGG: KEGG entry
- MetaCyc: metabolic pathway
- PRIAM: profile
- PDB structures: RCSB PDB PDBe PDBsum
- Gene Ontology: AmiGO / QuickGO
Search
- PMC: articles
- PubMed: articles
- NCBI: proteins

The enzyme 5-dehydro-2-deoxyphosphogluconate aldolase (EC 4.1.2.29) catalyzes the chemical reaction

5-dehydro-2-deoxy-D-gluconate 6-phosphate $\rightleftharpoons$ glycerone phosphate + malonate semialdehyde

This enzyme belongs to the family of lyases, specifically the aldehyde-lyases, which cleave carbon-carbon bonds. The systematic name of this enzyme class is 5-dehydro-2-deoxy-D-gluconate-6-phosphate malonate-semialdehyde-lyase (glycerone-phosphate-forming). Other names in common use include phospho-5-keto-2-deoxygluconate aldolase, 5-dehydro-2-deoxy-D-gluconate-6-phosphate, and malonate-semialdehyde-lyase.
