= Phenylserine aldolase =

phenylserine aldolase

Identifiers
- EC no.: 4.1.2.26
- CAS no.: 37290-60-1

Databases
- IntEnz: IntEnz view
- BRENDA: BRENDA entry
- ExPASy: NiceZyme view
- KEGG: KEGG entry
- MetaCyc: metabolic pathway
- PRIAM: profile
- PDB structures: RCSB PDB PDBe PDBsum
- Gene Ontology: AmiGO / QuickGO
Search
- PMC: articles
- PubMed: articles
- NCBI: proteins

The enzyme phenylserine aldolase (EC 4.1.2.26) catalyzes the chemical reaction

L-threo-3-phenylserine $\rightleftharpoons$ glycine + benzaldehyde

This enzyme belongs to the family of lyases, specifically the aldehyde-lyases, which cleave carbon-carbon bonds. The systematic name of this enzyme class is L-threo-3-phenylserine benzaldehyde-lyase (glycine-forming). This enzyme is also called L-threo-3-phenylserine benzaldehyde-lyase. It employs one cofactor, pyridoxal phosphate.

== Structural studies ==
As of late 2007, only one structure has been solved for this class of enzymes, with the PDB accession code 1V72.
