= Poly(alpha-L-guluronate) lyase =

guluronate-specific alginate lyase

Identifiers
- EC no.: 4.2.2.11
- CAS no.: 64177-88-4

Databases
- IntEnz: IntEnz view
- BRENDA: BRENDA entry
- ExPASy: NiceZyme view
- KEGG: KEGG entry
- MetaCyc: metabolic pathway
- PRIAM: profile
- PDB structures: RCSB PDB PDBe PDBsum
- Gene Ontology: AmiGO / QuickGO
Search
- PMC: articles
- PubMed: articles
- NCBI: proteins

The enzyme guluronate-specific alginate lyase (EC 4.2.2.11, formerly called poly(α-L-guluronate) lyase) catalyzes the following process:

Eliminative cleavage of alginate to give oligosaccharides with 4-deoxy-α-L-erythro-hex-4-enuronosyl groups at their non-reducing ends and α-L-uluronate at their reducing end.

This enzyme belongs to the family of lyases, specifically those carbon-oxygen lyases acting on polysaccharides. The systematic name of this enzyme class is alginate α-L-guluronate—uronate lyase. Other names in common use include alginase II, guluronate lyase, L-guluronan lyase, L-guluronate lyase, poly-α-L-guluronate lyase, and polyguluronate-specific alginate lyase.

== Structural studies ==
As of late 2007, only one structure has been solved for this class of enzymes, with the PDB accession code 1UAI.
