= Trimethylamine-oxide aldolase =

trimethylamine-oxide aldolase

Identifiers
- EC no.: 4.1.2.32
- CAS no.: 72561-08-1

Databases
- IntEnz: IntEnz view
- BRENDA: BRENDA entry
- ExPASy: NiceZyme view
- KEGG: KEGG entry
- MetaCyc: metabolic pathway
- PRIAM: profile
- PDB structures: RCSB PDB PDBe PDBsum
- Gene Ontology: AmiGO / QuickGO
Search
- PMC: articles
- PubMed: articles
- NCBI: proteins

The enzyme trimethylamine-oxide aldolase (EC 4.1.2.32) catalyzes the chemical reaction

trimethylamine N-oxide $\rightleftharpoons$ dimethylamine + formaldehyde

This enzyme belongs to the family of lyases, specifically the aldehyde-lyases, which cleave carbon-carbon bonds. The systematic name of this enzyme class is trimethylamine-N-oxide formaldehyde-lyase (dimethylamine-forming). Other names in common use include trimethylamine N-oxide formaldehyde-lyase, trimethylamine N-oxide aldolase, trimethylamine N-oxide demethylase, and trimethylamine-N-oxide formaldehyde-lyase. This enzyme participates in methane metabolism.
