= 3-deoxy-D-manno-octulosonate aldolase =

Class of enzymes

Identifiers
- EC no.: 4.1.2.23
- CAS no.: 9026-95-3

Databases
- IntEnz: IntEnz view
- BRENDA: BRENDA entry
- ExPASy: NiceZyme view
- KEGG: KEGG entry
- MetaCyc: metabolic pathway
- PRIAM: profile
- PDB structures: RCSB PDB PDBe PDBsum
- Gene Ontology: AmiGO / QuickGO
Search
- PMC: articles
- PubMed: articles
- NCBI: proteins

The enzyme 3-deoxy-D-manno-octulosonate aldolase (EC 4.1.2.23) catalyzes the chemical reaction

3-deoxy-D-manno-octulosonate $\rightleftharpoons$ pyruvate + D-arabinose

This enzyme belongs to the family of lyases, specifically the aldehyde-lyases, which cleave carbon-carbon bonds. The systematic name of this enzyme class is 3-deoxy-D-manno-octulosonate D-arabinose-lyase (pyruvate-forming). Other names in common use include 2-keto-3-deoxyoctonate aldolase, KDOaldolase, 3-deoxyoctulosonic aldolase, 2-keto-3-deoxyoctonic aldolase, 3-deoxy-D-manno-octulosonic aldolase, and 3-deoxy-D-manno-octulosonate D-arabinose-lyase.
