= Aldolase A =

Mammalian protein found in Homo sapiens

ALDOA

Identifiers
- Aliases: ALDOA, ALDA, GSD12, HEL-S-87p, aldolase, fructose-bisphosphate A, Aldolase A
- External IDs: OMIM: 103850; MGI: 87994; GeneCards: ALDOA
Available structures
PDB	Ortholog search: PDBe RCSB
PDB	List of PDB id codes 1ALD, 2ALD, 4ALD
Enzyme activity
EC #	BRENDA	ExPASy	KEGG	MetaCyc
4.1.2.13	↗	↗	↗	↗

Gene location (Human)
Chr.	Chromosome 16 (human)
Band	16p11.2	Start	30,064,164 bp
Band	16p11.2	End	30,070,457 bp

Gene location (Mouse)
Chr.	Chromosome 7 (mouse)
Band	7|7 F3	Start	126,394,406 bp
Band	7|7 F3	End	126,399,923 bp
RNA expression pattern
Bgee	Human / Mouse (ortholog); Top expressed in: gastrocnemius muscle; muscle of thigh; skeletal muscle tissue; superior frontal gyrus; apex of heart; prefrontal cortex; right frontal lobe; primary visual cortex; left ventricle; right auricle of heart / Top expressed in: medial head of gastrocnemius muscle; ankle; vastus lateralis muscle; triceps brachii muscle; sternocleidomastoid muscle; temporal muscle; digastric muscle; masseter muscle; tibialis anterior muscle; knee joint; More reference expression data
BioGPS	n/a
Gene ontology
Molecular function	cytoskeletal protein binding; tubulin binding; fructose binding; protein binding; catalytic activity; lyase activity; actin binding; fructose-bisphosphate aldolase activity; identical protein binding; RNA binding; cadherin binding
Cellular component	cytoplasm; M band; membrane; I band; extracellular region; actin cytoskeleton; extracellular exosome; platelet alpha granule lumen; nucleus; extracellular space; cytosol; secretory granule lumen; tertiary granule lumen; ficolin-1-rich granule lumen; sperm head
Biological process	gluconeogenesis; glycolytic process; muscle cell cellular homeostasis; canonical glycolysis; actin filament organization; fructose metabolic process; platelet degranulation; fructose 1,6-bisphosphate metabolic process; ATP biosynthetic process; regulation of cell shape; protein homotetramerization; striated muscle contraction; neutrophil degranulation; binding of sperm to zona pellucida
Sources:Amigo / QuickGO
Orthologs
Databases	NCBI: entry; OMA: entry
Species	Human	Mouse
Entrez	226	11674
Ensembl	ENSG00000149925	ENSMUSG00000030695
UniProt	P04075	P05064
RefSeq (mRNA)	NM_000034; NM_001127617; NM_001243175; NM_001243177; NM_184041 NM_184043; NM_001355562; NM_001355563; NM_001355564; NM_001355565	NM_001177307; NM_001177308; NM_007438
RefSeq (protein)	NP_001121089; NP_001230106; NP_908930; NP_908932	NP_001170778; NP_001170779; NP_031464
Location (UCSC)	Chr 16: 30.06 – 30.07 Mb	Chr 7: 126.39 – 126.4 Mb
PubMed search
- Wikidata
View/Edit Human	View/Edit Mouse

fructose-bisphosphate aldolase

Identifiers
- EC no.: 4.1.2.13
- CAS no.: 9024-52-6

Databases
- BRENDA: enzyme data
- ExPASy: NiceZyme view
- KEGG: enzyme entry
- MetaCyc: metabolic pathway
- Rhea: reactions
- PDB structures: RCSB PDB PDBe PDBsum
- Gene Ontology: AmiGO / QuickGO
Search
- PMC: articles
- PubMed: articles
- NCBI: proteins

Aldolase A (ALDOA, or ALDA), also known as fructose-bisphosphate aldolase, is an enzyme that in humans is encoded by the ALDOA gene on chromosome 16.

The protein encoded by this gene is a glycolytic enzyme that catalyzes the reversible conversion of fructose-1,6-bisphosphate to glyceraldehyde 3-phosphate (G3P) and dihydroxyacetone phosphate (DHAP). Three aldolase isozymes (A, B, and C), encoded by three different genes, are differentially expressed during development. Aldolase A is found in the developing embryo and is produced in even greater amounts in adult muscle. Aldolase A expression is repressed in adult liver, kidney and intestine and similar to aldolase C levels in brain and other nervous tissue. Aldolase A deficiency has been associated with myopathy and hemolytic anemia. Alternative splicing and alternative promoter usage results in multiple transcript variants. Related pseudogenes have been identified on chromosomes 3 and 10.

== Structure ==
ALDOA is a homotetramer and one of the three aldolase isozymes (A, B, and C), encoded by three different genes. The ALDOA gene contains 8 exons and the 5' UTR IB. Key amino acids responsible for its catalytic function have been identified. The residue Tyr363 functions as the acid–base catalyst for protonating C3 of the substrate, while Lys146 is proposed to stabilize the negative charge of the resulting conjugate base of Tyr363 and the strained configuration of the C-terminal. Residue Glu187 participates in multiple functions, including FBP aldolase catalysis, acid–base catalysis during substrate binding, dehydration, and substrate cleavage. Though ALDOA localizes to the nucleus, it lacks any known nuclear localization signals (NLS).

== Mechanism ==
In mammalian aldolase, the key catalytic amino acid residues involved in the reaction are lysine and tyrosine. The tyrosine acts as an efficient hydrogen acceptor while the lysine covalently binds and stabilizes the intermediates. Many bacteria use two magnesium ions in place of the lysine.

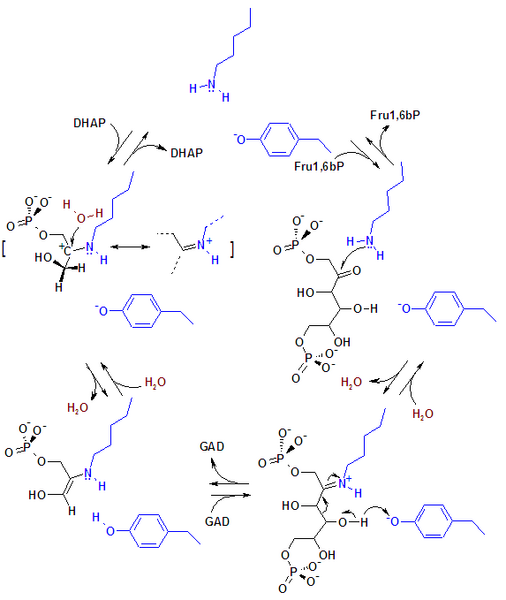
The reaction mechanism of aldolase. The enzyme's reactive site amino acid's side-chains are shown in blue. Abbreviations: DHAP - dihydroxyacetone phosphate; Fru1,6bP - Fructose-1,6-bisphosphate; GAD - glyceraldehyde 3-phosphate;

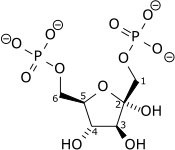
β-D-fructose 1,6-phosphate	fructose-bisphosphate aldolase	D-glyceraldehyde 3-phosphate		dihydroxyacetone phosphate
			+

Compound C05378 at KEGG Pathway Database. Enzyme 4.1.2.13 at KEGG Pathway Database. Compound C00111 at KEGG Pathway Database. Compound C00118 at KEGG Pathway Database.

The numbering of the carbon atoms indicates the fate of the carbons according to their position in fructose 6-phosphate.

== Function ==
ALDOA is a key enzyme in the fourth step of glycolysis, as well as in the reverse pathway gluconeogenesis. It catalyzes the reversible conversion of fructose-1,6-bisphosphate to glyceraldehydes-3-phosphate and dihydroxyacetone phosphate by aldol cleavage of the C3–C4 bond. As a result, it is a crucial player in ATP biosynthesis. ALDOA also contributes to other "moonlighting" functions such as muscle maintenance, regulation of cell shape and motility, striated muscle contraction, actin cytoskeleton organization, and regulation of cell proliferation. ALDOA likely regulates actin cytoskeleton remodeling through interacting with cytohesin-2 (ARNO) and Arf6.

ALDOA is ubiquitously expressed in most tissues, though it is predominantly expressed in developing embryo and adult muscle. In lymphocytes, ALDOA is the predominant aldolase isoform. Within the cell, ALDOA typically localizes to the cytoplasm, but it can localize to the nucleus during DNA synthesis of the cell cycle S phase. This nuclear localization is regulated by the protein kinases AKT and p38. It is suggested that the nucleus serves as a reservoir for ALDOA in low glucose conditions. ALDOA has also been found in mitochondria.

ALDOA is regulated by the energy metabolism substrates glucose, lactate, and glutamine. In human mast cells (MCs), ALDOA has been observed to undergo post-translational regulation by protein tyrosine nitration, which may alter its relative affinity for FBP and/or IP3. This change then affects IP3 and PLC signaling cascades in IgE-dependent responses.

== Clinical significance ==
Aldolase A (ALDOA) is highly expressed in multiple cancers, including lung squamous cell carcinoma (LSCC), renal cancer, and hepatocellular carcinoma. It is proposed that ALDOA overexpression enhances glycolysis in these tumor cells, promoting their growth. In LSCC, its upregulation correlates with metastasis and poor prognosis, while its downregulation reduces tumor cell motility and tumorigenesis. Thus, ALDOA could be a potential LSCC biomarker and therapeutic drug target.

Aldolase A deficiency is a rare, autosomal recessive disorder that is linked to hemolysis and accompanied by weakness, muscle pain, and myopathy.

== Interactive pathway map ==
Click on genes, proteins and metabolites below to link to respective articles. (Note: The interactive pathway map can be edited at WikiPathways: "GlycolysisGluconeogenesis_WP534".)

Glycolysis and Gluconeogenesis edit

== Interactions ==
Aldolase A has been shown to interact with:

- PLD2,
- actin,
- GLUT4,
- phospholipase D2,
- light chain 8 of dynein,
- erythrocyte anion exchanger Band 3 protein,
- ryanodine receptor,
- Cytohesin-2, and
- V-ATPase (vacuolar-type H+-ATPase).

== See also ==
- ALDOB
- ALDOC
- Fructose-bisphosphate aldolase
