= Ketotetrose-phosphate aldolase =

ketotetrose-phosphate aldolase

Identifiers
- EC no.: 4.1.2.2
- CAS no.: 9024-45-7

Databases
- IntEnz: IntEnz view
- BRENDA: BRENDA entry
- ExPASy: NiceZyme view
- KEGG: KEGG entry
- MetaCyc: metabolic pathway
- PRIAM: profile
- PDB structures: RCSB PDB PDBe PDBsum
- Gene Ontology: AmiGO / QuickGO
Search
- PMC: articles
- PubMed: articles
- NCBI: proteins

The enzyme ketotetrose-phosphate aldolase (EC 4.1.2.2) catalyzes the chemical reaction

erythrulose 1-phosphate $\rightleftharpoons$ glycerone phosphate + formaldehyde

Hence, this enzyme has one substrate, erythrulose 1-phosphate, and two products, dihydroxyacetone phosphate and formaldehyde.

This enzyme belongs to the family of lyases, specifically the aldehyde-lyases, which cleave carbon-carbon bonds. The systematic name of this enzyme class is erythrulose-1-phosphate formaldehyde-lyase (glycerone-phosphate-forming). Other names in common use include phosphoketotetrose aldolase, erythrulose-1-phosphate synthetase, erythrose-1-phosphate synthase, and erythrulose-1-phosphate formaldehyde-lyase.
