= Lactate aldolase =

lactate aldolase

Identifiers
- EC no.: 4.1.2.36
- CAS no.: 110777-33-8

Databases
- IntEnz: IntEnz view
- BRENDA: BRENDA entry
- ExPASy: NiceZyme view
- KEGG: KEGG entry
- MetaCyc: metabolic pathway
- PRIAM: profile
- PDB structures: RCSB PDB PDBe PDBsum
- Gene Ontology: AmiGO / QuickGO
Search
- PMC: articles
- PubMed: articles
- NCBI: proteins

The enzyme lactate aldolase (EC 4.1.2.36) catalyzes the chemical reaction

(S)-lactate $\rightleftharpoons$ formate + acetaldehyde

This enzyme belongs to the family of lyases, specifically the aldehyde-lyases, which cleave carbon-carbon bonds. The systematic name of this enzyme class is (S)-lactate acetaldehyde-lyase (formate-forming). Other names in common use include lactate synthase, and (S)-lactate acetaldehyde-lyase. This enzyme participates in pyruvate metabolism.
