= Dimethylaniline-N-oxide aldolase =

dimethylaniline-N-oxide aldolase

Identifiers
- EC no.: 4.1.2.24
- CAS no.: 37290-58-7

Databases
- IntEnz: IntEnz view
- BRENDA: BRENDA entry
- ExPASy: NiceZyme view
- KEGG: KEGG entry
- MetaCyc: metabolic pathway
- PRIAM: profile
- PDB structures: RCSB PDB PDBe PDBsum
- Gene Ontology: AmiGO / QuickGO
Search
- PMC: articles
- PubMed: articles
- NCBI: proteins

The enzyme dimethylaniline-N-oxide aldolase (EC 4.1.2.24) catalyzes the chemical reaction

N,N-dimethylaniline N-oxide $\rightleftharpoons$ N-methylaniline + formaldehyde

This enzyme belongs to the family of lyases, specifically the aldehyde-lyases, which cleave carbon-carbon bonds. The systematic name of this enzyme class is N,N-dimethylaniline-N-oxide formaldehyde-lyase (N-methylaniline-forming). Other names in common use include microsomal oxidase II, microsomal N-oxide dealkylase, and N,N-dimethylaniline-N-oxide formaldehyde-lyase.
