= 2-dehydropantoate aldolase =

Class of enzymes

Identifiers
- EC no.: 4.1.2.12
- CAS no.: 9024-51-5

Databases
- IntEnz: IntEnz view
- BRENDA: BRENDA entry
- ExPASy: NiceZyme view
- KEGG: KEGG entry
- MetaCyc: metabolic pathway
- PRIAM: profile
- PDB structures: RCSB PDB PDBe PDBsum
- Gene Ontology: AmiGO / QuickGO
Search
- PMC: articles
- PubMed: articles
- NCBI: proteins

The enzyme 2-dehydropantoate aldolase (EC 4.1.2.12) catalyzes the chemical reaction:

2-dehydropantoate $\rightleftharpoons$ 3-methyl-2-oxobutanoate + formaldehyde

This enzyme belongs to the family of lyases, specifically the aldehyde-lyases, which cleave carbon-carbon bonds. The systematic name of this enzyme class is 2-dehydropantoate formaldehyde-lyase (3-methyl-2-oxobutanoate-forming). Other names in common use include ketopantoaldolase, and 2-dehydropantoate formaldehyde-lyase.
