= Sphinganine-1-phosphate aldolase =

sphinganine-1-phosphate aldolase

Identifiers
- EC no.: 4.1.2.27
- CAS no.: 39391-27-0

Databases
- IntEnz: IntEnz view
- BRENDA: BRENDA entry
- ExPASy: NiceZyme view
- KEGG: KEGG entry
- MetaCyc: metabolic pathway
- PRIAM: profile
- PDB structures: RCSB PDB PDBe PDBsum
- Gene Ontology: AmiGO / QuickGO
Search
- PMC: articles
- PubMed: articles
- NCBI: proteins

The enzyme sphinganine-1-phosphate aldolase (EC 4.1.2.27) catalyzes the chemical reaction

sphinganine 1-phosphate $\rightleftharpoons$ phosphoethanolamine + palmitaldehyde

This enzyme belongs to the family of lyases, specifically the aldehyde-lyases, which cleave carbon-carbon bonds. The systematic name of this enzyme class is sphinganine-1-phosphate palmitaldehyde-lyase (phosphoethanolamine-forming). Other names in common use include dihydrosphingosine 1-phosphate aldolase, sphinganine-1-phosphate alkanal-lyase, sphinganine-1-phosphate lyase, and sphinganine-1-phosphate palmitaldehyde-lyase. This enzyme participates in sphingolipid metabolism. It employs one cofactor, pyridoxal phosphate.
