= Rhamnulose-1-phosphate aldolase =

rhamnulose-1-phosphate aldolase

Identifiers
- EC no.: 4.1.2.19
- CAS no.: 9054-58-4

Databases
- IntEnz: IntEnz view
- BRENDA: BRENDA entry
- ExPASy: NiceZyme view
- KEGG: KEGG entry
- MetaCyc: metabolic pathway
- PRIAM: profile
- PDB structures: RCSB PDB PDBe PDBsum
- Gene Ontology: AmiGO / QuickGO
Search
- PMC: articles
- PubMed: articles
- NCBI: proteins

The enzyme rhamnulose-1-phosphate aldolase (EC 4.1.2.19) catalyzes the chemical reaction

L-rhamnulose 1-phosphate $\rightleftharpoons$ glycerone phosphate + (S)-lactaldehyde

This enzyme belongs to the family of lyases, specifically the aldehyde-lyases, which cleave carbon-carbon bonds. The systematic name of this enzyme class is L-rhamnulose-1-phosphate (S)-lactaldehyde-lyase (glycerone-phosphate-forming). Other names in common use include rhamnulose phosphate aldolase, L-rhamnulose 1-phosphate aldolase, L-rhamnulose-phosphate aldolase, and L-rhamnulose-1-phosphate lactaldehyde-lyase. This enzyme participates in pentose and glucuronate interconversions and fructose and mannose metabolism.

== Structural studies ==
As of late 2007, two structures have been solved for this class of enzymes, with PDB accession codes 1GT7 and 1OJR.
