= 2-dehydro-3-deoxyglucarate aldolase =

Class of enzymes

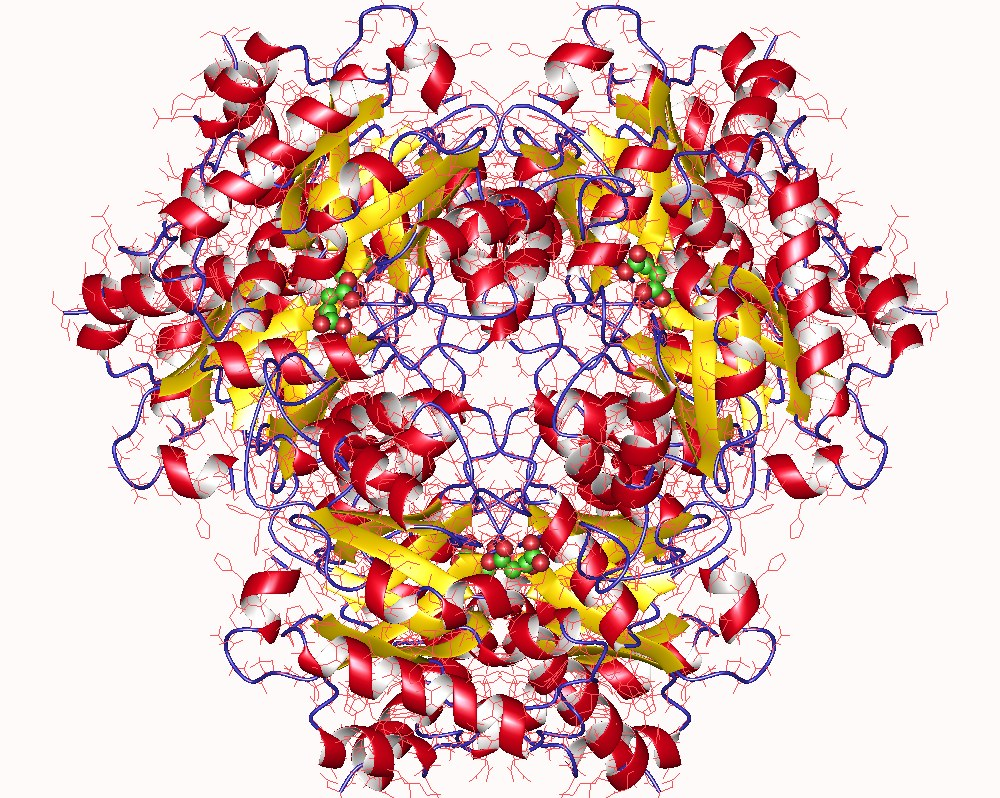
- 2-dehydro-3-deoxyglucarate aldolase hexamer, Staphylococcus aureus

Identifiers
- EC no.: 4.1.2.20
- CAS no.: 37290-56-5

Databases
- IntEnz: IntEnz view
- BRENDA: BRENDA entry
- ExPASy: NiceZyme view
- KEGG: KEGG entry
- MetaCyc: metabolic pathway
- PRIAM: profile
- PDB structures: RCSB PDB PDBe PDBsum
- Gene Ontology: AmiGO / QuickGO
Search
- PMC: articles
- PubMed: articles
- NCBI: proteins

The enzyme 2-dehydro-3-deoxyglucarate aldolase (EC 4.1.2.20) catalyzes the chemical reaction

2-dehydro-3-deoxy-D-glucarate $\rightleftharpoons$ pyruvate + tartronate semialdehyde

This enzyme belongs to the family of lyases, specifically the aldehyde-lyases, which cleave carbon-carbon bonds. The systematic name of this enzyme class is 2-dehydro-3-deoxy-D-glucarate tartronate-semialdehyde-lyase (pyruvate-forming). Other names in common use include 2-keto-3-deoxyglucarate aldolase, alpha-keto-beta-deoxy-D-glucarate aldolase, and 2-dehydro-3-deoxy-D-glucarate tartronate-semialdehyde-lyase. This enzyme participates in ascorbate and aldarate metabolism.

== Structural studies ==
As of late 2007, 6 structures have been solved for this class of enzymes, with PDB accession codes 1DXE, 1DXF, 1W37, 1W3I, 1W3N, and 1W3T.
