= 17-alpha-hydroxyprogesterone aldolase =

Class of enzymes

17α-Hydroxyprogesterone aldolase

Identifiers
- EC no.: 4.1.2.30
- CAS no.: 62213-24-5

Databases
- IntEnz: IntEnz view
- BRENDA: BRENDA entry
- ExPASy: NiceZyme view
- KEGG: KEGG entry
- MetaCyc: metabolic pathway
- PRIAM: profile
- PDB structures: RCSB PDB PDBe PDBsum
- Gene Ontology: AmiGO / QuickGO
Search
- PMC: articles
- PubMed: articles
- NCBI: proteins

In enzymology, a 17α-hydroxyprogesterone aldolase (EC 4.1.2.30) is an enzyme that catalyzes the chemical reaction

17α-hydroxyprogesterone $\rightleftharpoons$ androst-4-en-3,17-dione + acetaldehyde

Hence, this enzyme has one substrate, 17α-hydroxyprogesterone, and two products, androst-4-en-3,17-dione and acetaldehyde.

This enzyme belongs to the family of lyases, specifically the aldehyde-lyases, which cleave carbon-carbon bonds. The systematic name of this enzyme class is 17α-hydroxyprogesterone acetaldehyde-lyase (4-androstene-3,17-dione-forming). Other names in common use include C-17/C-20-lyase, and 17α-hydroxyprogesterone acetaldehyde-lyase. This enzyme participates in androgen and estrogen metabolism.
