= 2-methylcitrate dehydratase =

Class of enzymes

Identifiers
- EC no.: 4.2.1.79
- CAS no.: 80891-26-5

Databases
- BRENDA: enzyme data
- ExPASy: NiceZyme view
- KEGG: enzyme entry
- MetaCyc: metabolic pathway
- Rhea: reactions
- PDB structures: RCSB PDB PDBe PDBsum
- Gene Ontology: AmiGO / QuickGO
Search
- PMC: articles
- PubMed: articles
- NCBI: proteins

The enzyme 2-methylcitrate dehydratase (EC 4.2.1.79) catalyzes the chemical reaction

(2S,3S)-2-hydroxybutane-1,2,3-tricarboxylate $\rightleftharpoons$ (Z)-but-2-ene-1,2,3-tricarboxylate + H_{2}O

This enzyme belongs to the family of lyases, specifically the hydro-lyases, which cleave carbon-oxygen bonds. The systematic name of this enzyme class is (2S,3S)-2-hydroxybutane-1,2,3-tricarboxylate hydro-lyase [(Z)-but-2-ene-1,2,3-tricarboxylate-forming]. Other names in common use include 2-methylcitrate hydro-lyase, PrpD, and 2-hydroxybutane-1,2,3-tricarboxylate hydro-lyase. This enzyme participates in propanoate metabolism.

== Structural studies ==
As of late 2007, only one structure has been solved for this class of enzymes, with the PDB accession code PDB: 1SZQ.
