= 1-hydroxy-2-naphthoate 1,2-dioxygenase =

Class of enzymes

Identifiers
- EC no.: 1.13.11.38
- CAS no.: 85941-64-6

Databases
- IntEnz: IntEnz view
- BRENDA: BRENDA entry
- ExPASy: NiceZyme view
- KEGG: KEGG entry
- MetaCyc: metabolic pathway
- PRIAM: profile
- PDB structures: RCSB PDB PDBe PDBsum
- Gene Ontology: AmiGO / QuickGO
Search
- PMC: articles
- PubMed: articles
- NCBI: proteins

1-hydroxy-2-naphthoate 1,2-dioxygenase (EC 1.13.11.38) is an enzyme that catalyzes the chemical reaction

1-hydroxy-2-naphthoic acid
O_{2}
(3Z)-4-(2-carboxyphenyl)-2-oxobut-3-enoic acid

The two substrates of this enzyme are 1-hydroxy-2-naphthoic acid and oxygen. Its product is (3Z)-4-(2-carboxyphenyl)-2-oxobut-3-enoic acid.

This enzyme participates in phenanthrene metabolism. It employs one cofactor, iron.

== Nomenclature ==
This enzyme belongs to the family of oxidoreductases, specifically those acting on single donors with O_{2} as oxidant and incorporation of two atoms of oxygen into the substrate (oxygenases). The oxygen incorporated need not be derived from O_{2}. The systematic name of this enzyme class is 1-hydroxy-2-naphthoate:oxygen 1,2-oxidoreductase (decyclizing). Other names in common use include 1-hydroxy-2-naphthoate dioxygenase, 1-hydroxy-2-naphthoate-degrading enzyme, and 1-hydroxy-2-naphthoic acid dioxygenase.
