= CYTH2 =

Protein-coding gene in the species Homo sapiens

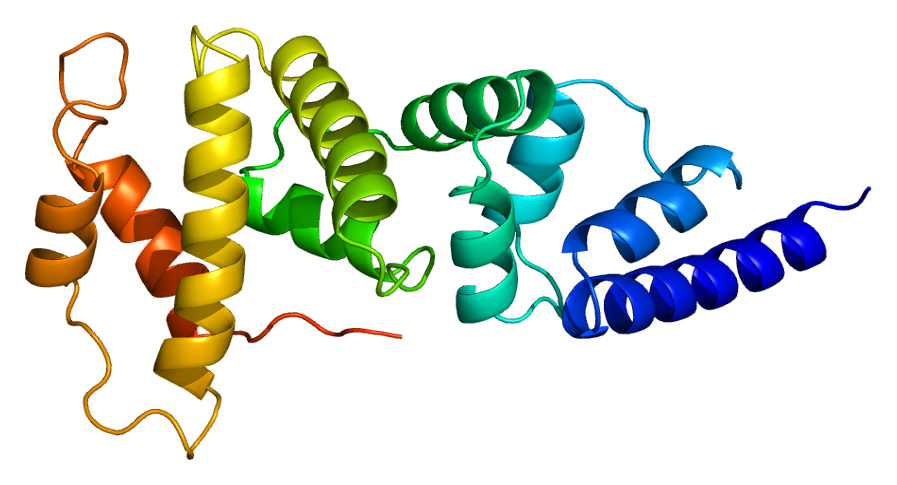

Identifiers
- Aliases: CYTH2, ARNO, CTS18, CTS18.1, PSCD2, PSCD2L, SEC7L, Sec7p-L, Sec7p-like, cytohesin 2, cytohesin-2
- External IDs: OMIM: 602488; MGI: 1334255; GeneCards: CYTH2
Available structures
PDB	Ortholog search: PDBe RCSB
PDB	List of PDB id codes 1PBV, 1R8M, 1R8Q, 1R8S, 1S9D, 4JMI, 4JMO, 4JWL, 4JXH, 4L5M, 4Z21

Gene location (Human)
Chr.	Chromosome 19 (human)
Band	19q13.33	Start	48,469,208 bp
Band	19q13.33	End	48,482,314 bp

Gene location (Mouse)
Chr.	Chromosome 7 (mouse)
Band	7|7 B3	Start	45,456,061 bp
Band	7|7 B3	End	45,464,005 bp
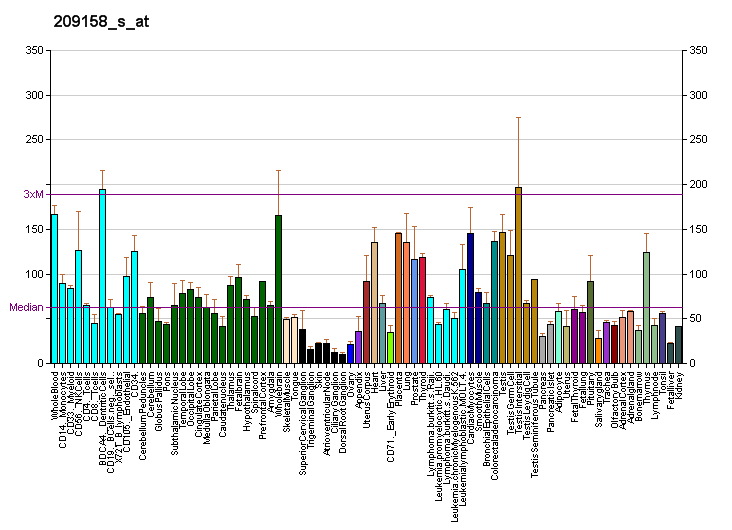
RNA expression pattern
Bgee	Human / Mouse (ortholog); Top expressed in: ganglionic eminence; left testis; right testis; frontal pole; right lobe of thyroid gland; left lobe of thyroid gland; paraflocculus of cerebellum; Brodmann area 10; middle frontal gyrus; ventricular zone / Top expressed in: neural layer of retina; ganglionic eminence; medial ganglionic eminence; ventricular zone; dentate gyrus of hippocampal formation granule cell; neural tube; spermatid; seminiferous tubule; superior frontal gyrus; granulocyte; More reference expression data
BioGPS	More reference expression data
Gene ontology
Molecular function	inositol 1,4,5 trisphosphate binding; protein binding; guanyl-nucleotide exchange factor activity; lipid binding
Cellular component	cytoplasm; growth cone; plasma membrane; cell projection; membrane; Golgi membrane; cytosol; adherens junction; bicellular tight junction; cell junction
Biological process	regulation of ARF protein signal transduction; endocytosis; actin cytoskeleton organization
Sources:Amigo / QuickGO
Orthologs
Databases	NCBI: entry; OMA: entry
Species	Human	Mouse
Entrez	9266	19158
Ensembl	ENSG00000105443	ENSMUSG00000003269
UniProt	Q99418	P63034
RefSeq (mRNA)	NM_004228; NM_017457	NM_001112701; NM_011181
RefSeq (protein)	NP_004219; NP_059431	NP_001106171; NP_035311
Location (UCSC)	Chr 19: 48.47 – 48.48 Mb	Chr 7: 45.46 – 45.46 Mb
PubMed search
- Wikidata
View/Edit Human	View/Edit Mouse

Cytohesin-2 is a protein that in humans is encoded by the CYTH2 gene.

== Function ==
Cytohesin-2 (CYTH2), formerly known as Pleckstrin homology, Sec7 and coiled/coil domains 2 (PSCD2), is a member of the cytohesin family. Members of this family have identical structural organization that consists of an N-terminal coiled-coil motif, a central Sec7 domain, and a C-terminal pleckstrin homology (PH) domain. The coiled-coil motif is involved in homodimerization, the Sec7 domain contains guanine-nucleotide exchange protein (GEP) activity, and the PH domain interacts with phospholipids and is responsible for association of CYTHs with membranes. Members of this family appear to mediate the regulation of protein sorting and membrane trafficking. CYTH2 exhibits GEP activity in vitro with ARF1, ARF3, and ARF6. CYTH2 protein is 83% homologous to CYTH1. Two transcript variants encoding different isoforms have been found for this gene.

== Interactions ==
CYTH2 has been shown to interact with Arrestin beta 2 and Arrestin beta 1.
