= Arrestin beta 1 =

Human protein and coding gene

ARRB1
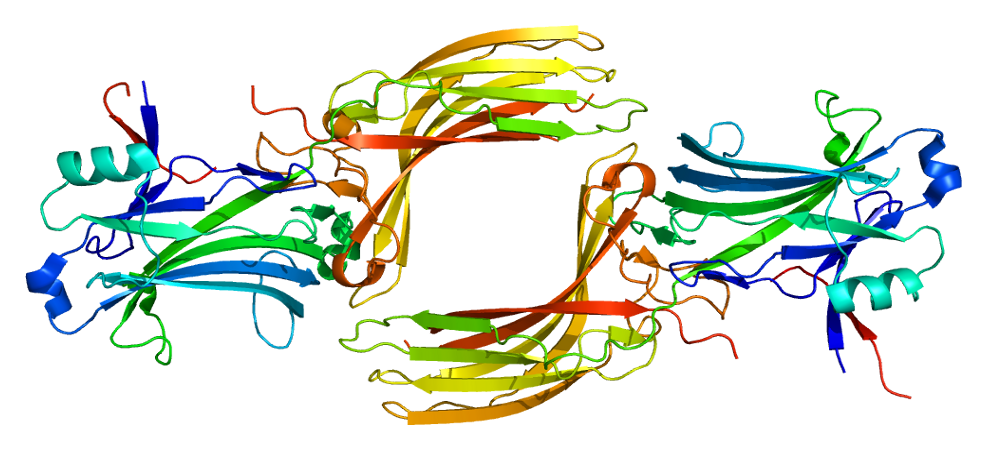

Identifiers
- Aliases: ARRB1, ARB1, ARR1, Arrestin beta 1
- External IDs: OMIM: 107940; MGI: 99473; GeneCards: ARRB1
Available structures
PDB	Ortholog search: PDBe RCSB
PDB	List of PDB id codes 2IV8

Gene location (Human)
Chr.	Chromosome 11 (human)
Band	11q13.4	Start	75,260,122 bp
Band	11q13.4	End	75,351,705 bp

Gene location (Mouse)
Chr.	Chromosome 7 (mouse)
Band	7 E1|7 54.09 cM	Start	99,184,673 bp
Band	7 E1|7 54.09 cM	End	99,255,978 bp
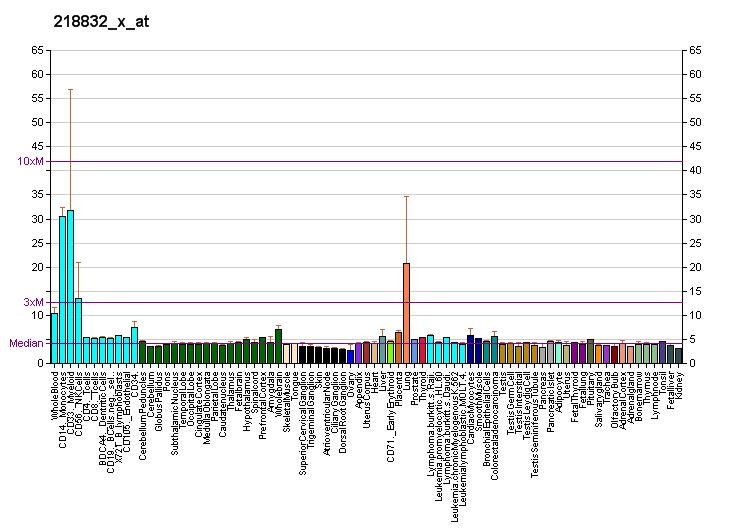
RNA expression pattern
Bgee	Human / Mouse (ortholog); Top expressed in: monocyte; granulocyte; right lung; upper lobe of left lung; anterior cingulate cortex; sural nerve; right frontal lobe; prefrontal cortex; nucleus accumbens; body of stomach / Top expressed in: fetal liver hematopoietic progenitor cell; superior frontal gyrus; inferior colliculi; granulocyte; molar; tibiofemoral joint; superior colliculus; dentate gyrus of hippocampal formation granule cell; primary visual cortex; cerebellar cortex; More reference expression data
BioGPS	More reference expression data
Gene ontology
Molecular function	GTPase activator activity; histone acetyltransferase activity; enzyme inhibitor activity; insulin-like growth factor receptor binding; transcription factor binding; mitogen-activated protein kinase kinase binding; clathrin adaptor activity; protein phosphorylated amino acid binding; cysteine-type endopeptidase inhibitor activity involved in apoptotic process; protein binding; AP-2 adaptor complex binding; alpha-1B adrenergic receptor binding; V2 vasopressin receptor binding; phosphoprotein binding; angiotensin receptor binding; ubiquitin protein ligase binding; arrestin family protein binding; signaling receptor binding; enzyme binding; estrogen receptor binding; alpha-1A adrenergic receptor binding; follicle-stimulating hormone receptor binding; transmembrane transporter binding; clathrin binding; G protein-coupled receptor binding
Cellular component	cytoplasm; cytosol; postsynaptic membrane; membrane; nucleus; cell projection; dendritic spine; heterotrimeric G-protein complex; chromatin; plasma membrane; intracellular anatomical structure; nucleoplasm; clathrin-coated pit; pseudopodium; postsynaptic density; Golgi membrane; lysosomal membrane; basolateral plasma membrane; cytoplasmic vesicle membrane; cytoplasmic vesicle; nuclear body; endosome
Biological process	positive regulation of Rho protein signal transduction; regulation of G protein-coupled receptor signaling pathway; positive regulation of receptor internalization; transcription by RNA polymerase II; stress fiber assembly; follicle-stimulating hormone signaling pathway; platelet activation; positive regulation of cysteine-type endopeptidase activity involved in apoptotic process; negative regulation of GTPase activity; positive regulation of ERK1 and ERK2 cascade; positive regulation of insulin secretion involved in cellular response to glucose stimulus; proteasome-mediated ubiquitin-dependent protein catabolic process; phototransduction; regulation of transcription, DNA-templated; transcription, DNA-templated; positive regulation of peptidyl-serine phosphorylation; negative regulation of interleukin-8 production; protein ubiquitination; protein transport; negative regulation of protein phosphorylation; positive regulation of smooth muscle cell apoptotic process; positive regulation of histone H4 acetylation; positive regulation of protein binding; negative regulation of NF-kappaB transcription factor activity; positive regulation of protein ubiquitination; G protein-coupled receptor internalization; negative regulation of cysteine-type endopeptidase activity involved in apoptotic process; endocytosis; negative regulation of interleukin-6 production; positive regulation of histone acetylation; negative regulation of protein ubiquitination; negative regulation of ERK1 and ERK2 cascade; negative regulation of signal transduction; positive regulation of transcription by RNA polymerase II; signal transduction; positive regulation of GTPase activity; apoptotic process; membrane organization; regulation of apoptotic process; ubiquitin-dependent protein catabolic process; negative regulation of Notch signaling pathway; G protein-coupled receptor signaling pathway; positive regulation of protein phosphorylation; positive regulation of cell population proliferation; negative regulation of apoptotic process; negative regulation of neuron apoptotic process; histone acetylation
Sources:Amigo / QuickGO
Orthologs
Databases	NCBI: entry; OMA: entry
Species	Human	Mouse
Entrez	408	109689
Ensembl	ENSG00000137486	ENSMUSG00000018909
UniProt	P49407	Q8BWG8
RefSeq (mRNA)	NM_004041; NM_020251	NM_177231; NM_178220
RefSeq (protein)	NP_004032; NP_064647	NP_796205; NP_835738
Location (UCSC)	Chr 11: 75.26 – 75.35 Mb	Chr 7: 99.18 – 99.26 Mb
PubMed search
- Wikidata
View/Edit Human	View/Edit Mouse

Arrestin, beta 1, also known as ARRB1, is a protein which in humans is encoded by the ARRB1 gene.

== Function ==
Members of arrestin/beta-arrestin protein family are thought to participate in agonist-mediated desensitization of G protein-coupled receptors and cause specific dampening of cellular responses to stimuli such as hormones, neurotransmitters, or sensory signals. Arrestin beta 1 is a cytosolic protein and acts as a cofactor in the beta-adrenergic receptor kinase (BARK) mediated desensitization of beta-adrenergic receptors. Besides the central nervous system, it is expressed at high levels in peripheral blood leukocytes, and thus the BARK/beta-arrestin system is believed to play a major role in regulating receptor-mediated immune functions. Alternatively spliced transcripts encoding different isoforms of arrestin beta 1 have been described, however, their exact functions are not known. Beta-arrestin has been shown to play a role as a scaffold that binds intermediates and may direct G-protein signaling by connecting receptors to clathrin-mediated endocytosis.

== Interactions ==
Arrestin beta 1 has been shown to interact with

- Arf6,
- PTHLH,
- DVL2
- Mdm2,
- OPRD1,
- PSCD2, and
- RALGDS.
