= 2-dehydro-3-deoxy-D-pentonate aldolase =

Class of enzymes

Identifiers
- EC no.: 4.1.2.28
- CAS no.: 55326-36-8

Databases
- IntEnz: IntEnz view
- BRENDA: BRENDA entry
- ExPASy: NiceZyme view
- KEGG: KEGG entry
- MetaCyc: metabolic pathway
- PRIAM: profile
- PDB structures: RCSB PDB PDBe PDBsum
- Gene Ontology: AmiGO / QuickGO
Search
- PMC: articles
- PubMed: articles
- NCBI: proteins

The enzyme 2-dehydro-3-deoxy-D-pentonate aldolase (EC 4.1.2.28) catalyzes the chemical reaction

2-dehydro-3-deoxy-Dpentonate $\rightleftharpoons$ pyruvate + glycolaldehyde

This enzyme belongs to the family of lyases, specifically the aldehyde-lyases, which cleave carbon-carbon bonds. The systematic name of this enzyme class is 2-dehydro-3-deoxy-D-pentonate glycolaldehyde-lyase (pyruvate-forming). Other names in common use include 2-keto-3-deoxy-D-pentonate aldolase, 3-deoxy-D-pentulosonic acid aldolase, and 2-dehydro-3-deoxy-D-pentonate glycolaldehyde-lyase. This enzyme participates in pentose and glucuronate interconversions.
