= Aldolase C =

Protein-coding gene in the species Homo sapiens

ALDOC
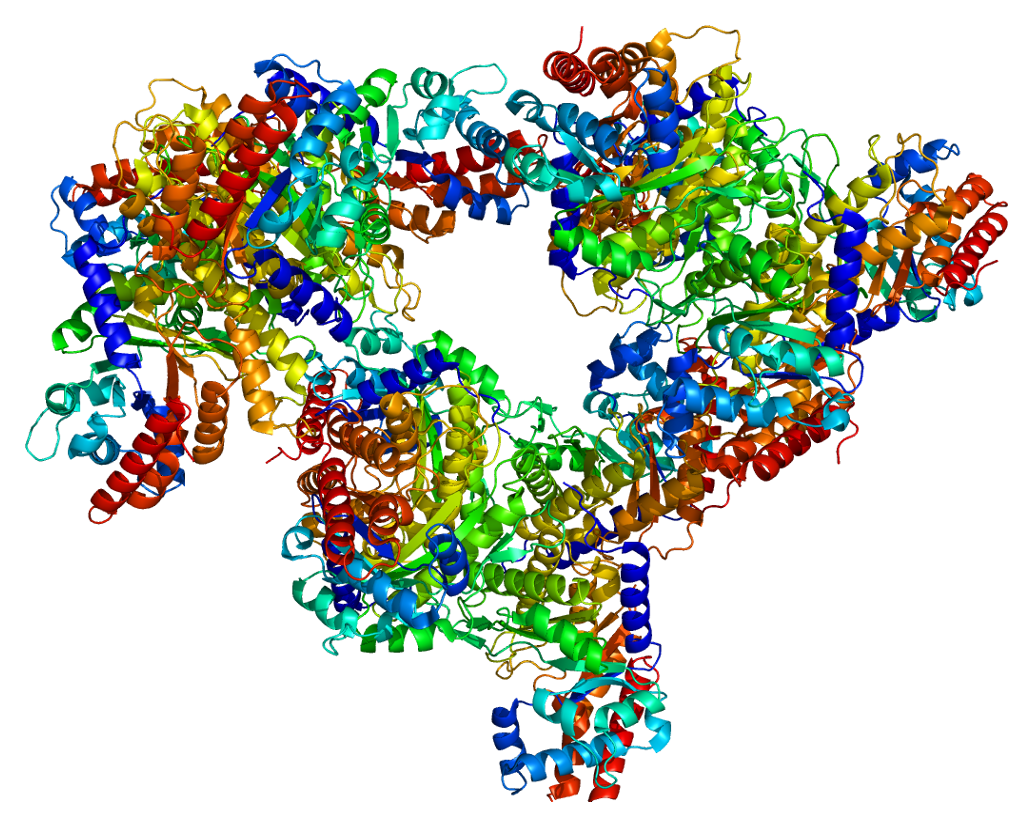

Identifiers
- Aliases: ALDOC, ALDC, Aldolase C, aldolase, fructose-bisphosphate C
- External IDs: OMIM: 103870; MGI: 101863; GeneCards: ALDOC
Available structures
PDB	Ortholog search: PDBe RCSB
PDB	List of PDB id codes 1XFB
Enzyme activity
EC #	BRENDA	ExPASy	KEGG	MetaCyc
4.1.2.13	↗	↗	↗	↗

Gene location (Human)
Chr.	Chromosome 17 (human)
Band	17q11.2	Start	28,573,115 bp
Band	17q11.2	End	28,576,948 bp

Gene location (Mouse)
Chr.	Chromosome 11 (mouse)
Band	11 B5|11 46.74 cM	Start	78,213,794 bp
Band	11 B5|11 46.74 cM	End	78,218,607 bp
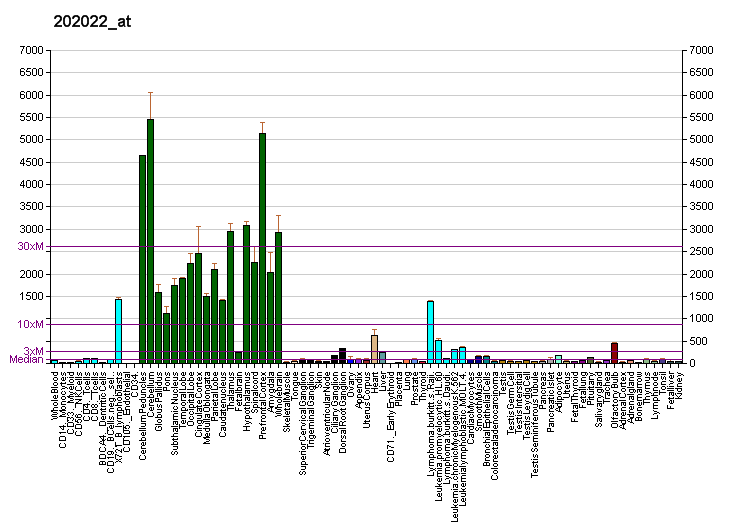
RNA expression pattern
Bgee	Human / Mouse (ortholog); Top expressed in: right hemisphere of cerebellum; pons; right frontal lobe; lateral nuclear group of thalamus; amygdala; nucleus accumbens; cingulate gyrus; Brodmann area 9; anterior cingulate cortex; superior vestibular nucleus / Top expressed in: cerebellar vermis; medial vestibular nucleus; deep cerebellar nuclei; dorsal tegmental nucleus; lobe of cerebellum; central gray substance of midbrain; pontine nuclei; motor neuron; corpora quadrigemina; inferior colliculi; More reference expression data
BioGPS	More reference expression data
Gene ontology
Molecular function	cytoskeletal protein binding; protein binding; catalytic activity; lyase activity; fructose-bisphosphate aldolase activity
Cellular component	cytosol; extracellular exosome; cytoskeleton; mitochondrion; extracellular region; secretory granule lumen; tertiary granule lumen; ficolin-1-rich granule lumen
Biological process	gluconeogenesis; fructose metabolic process; glycolytic process; epithelial cell differentiation; canonical glycolysis; fructose 1,6-bisphosphate metabolic process; neutrophil degranulation
Sources:Amigo / QuickGO
Orthologs
Databases	NCBI: entry; OMA: entry
Species	Human	Mouse
Entrez	230	11676
Ensembl	ENSG00000109107	ENSMUSG00000017390
UniProt	P09972	P05063
RefSeq (mRNA)	NM_005165	NM_009657; NM_001303423
RefSeq (protein)	NP_005156	NP_001290352; NP_033787
Location (UCSC)	Chr 17: 28.57 – 28.58 Mb	Chr 11: 78.21 – 78.22 Mb
PubMed search
- Wikidata
View/Edit Human	View/Edit Mouse

Aldolase C, fructose-bisphosphate (ALDOC, or ALDC), is an enzyme that, in humans, is encoded by the ALDOC gene on chromosome 17. This gene encodes a member of the class I fructose-bisphosphate aldolase gene family. Expressed specifically in the hippocampus and Purkinje cells of the brain, the encoded protein is a glycolytic enzyme that catalyzes the reversible aldol cleavage of fructose 1,6-bisphosphate and fructose-1-phosphate to dihydroxyacetone phosphate and either glyceraldehyde 3-phosphate or glyceraldehyde, respectively.

== Structure ==
ALDOC is one of the three aldolase isozymes (A, B, and C), encoded by three different genes. The amino acid sequence of ALDOC is highly similar to those of the other isozymes, sharing a 68% identity with ALDOB and 78% identity with ALDOA. In particular, the residues Asp33, Arg42, Lys107, Lys146, Glu187, Ser271, Arg303, and Lys229 are all conserved in the active sites of the three isozymes. This active site is located in the center of the homotetrameric αβ-barrel structure of these aldolases. However, several structural details set ALDOC apart. For instance, the Arg303 residue in ALDOC adopts an intermediate conformation between the liganded and unliganded structures observed in the other isozymes. Also, the C-terminal region between Glu332 and Lys71 forms a salt bridge with the barrel region that is absent in the A and B isoforms. Moreover, the electrostatic surface of ALDOC is more negatively charged, which may serve as an acidic binding site or as a docking site to accommodate the C-terminal conformations. Four ALDOC-specific residues (N90, V92, R96 and D100) may be key for ALDOC-specific functions.

== Function ==
ALDOC is a key enzyme in the fourth step of glycolysis, as well as in the reverse pathway gluconeogenesis. It catalyzes the reversible conversion of fructose-1,6-bisphosphate to glyceraldehydes-3-phosphate (G3P), or glyceraldehyde, and dihydroxyacetone phosphate (DHAP) by aldol cleavage. As a result, it is a crucial player in ATP biosynthesis. As an aldolase, ALDOC putatively also contributes to other "moonlighting" functions, though its exact involvements remain unclear. For instance, it binds less tightly to the cytoskeleton than the other isozymes do, likely due to its more acidic pI. In addition, ALDOC participates in the stress-response pathway for lung epithelial cell function during hypoxia and in the resistance of cerebellar Purkinje cells against excitotoxic insult.

ALDOC is ubiquitously expressed in most tissues, though it is predominantly expressed in brain, smooth muscle, and neuronal tissue. However, since the ALDOA isoform is co-expressed with ALDOC in the central nervous system (CS), it is suggested that ALDOC contributes to CNS function outside of glycolysis. Moreover, its presence within other cell types, such as platelets and mast cells (MCs), may serve as a failsafe in the case that the other predominant aldolase isozymes become inactivated. Within cells, it localizes to the cytoplasm.

== Clinical significance ==
This aldolase has been associated with cancer.

ALDOC is found to be upregulated in the brains of schizophrenia (SCZ) patients. Notably, while ALDOC is differentially expressed in the anterior cingulate cortex (ACC) of male SCZ patients, it displays no significant changes in female SCZ patients, indicating that different regulatory mechanisms may be involved in male versus female SCZ patients. It is likely that ALDOC is involved in SCZ through its role in glycolysis, which is a central biochemical pathway in SCZ.

Furthermore, ALDOC is reported to undergo oxidation in brains affected by mild cognitive impairment (MCI) and Alzheimer's disease (AD). This oxidative modification inhibits ALDOC activity, causing the accumulation of fructose 1,6- bisphosphate and driving the reverse reaction, in the direction of gluconeogenesis rather than glycolysis, thus halting ATP production.

== Interactive pathway map ==
Click on genes, proteins and metabolites below to link to respective articles. (Note: The interactive pathway map can be edited at WikiPathways: "GlycolysisGluconeogenesis_WP534".)

Glycolysis and Gluconeogenesis edit

== See also ==
- ALDOA
- ALDOB
- Fructose-bisphosphate aldolase
