= Fructose-bisphosphate aldolase =

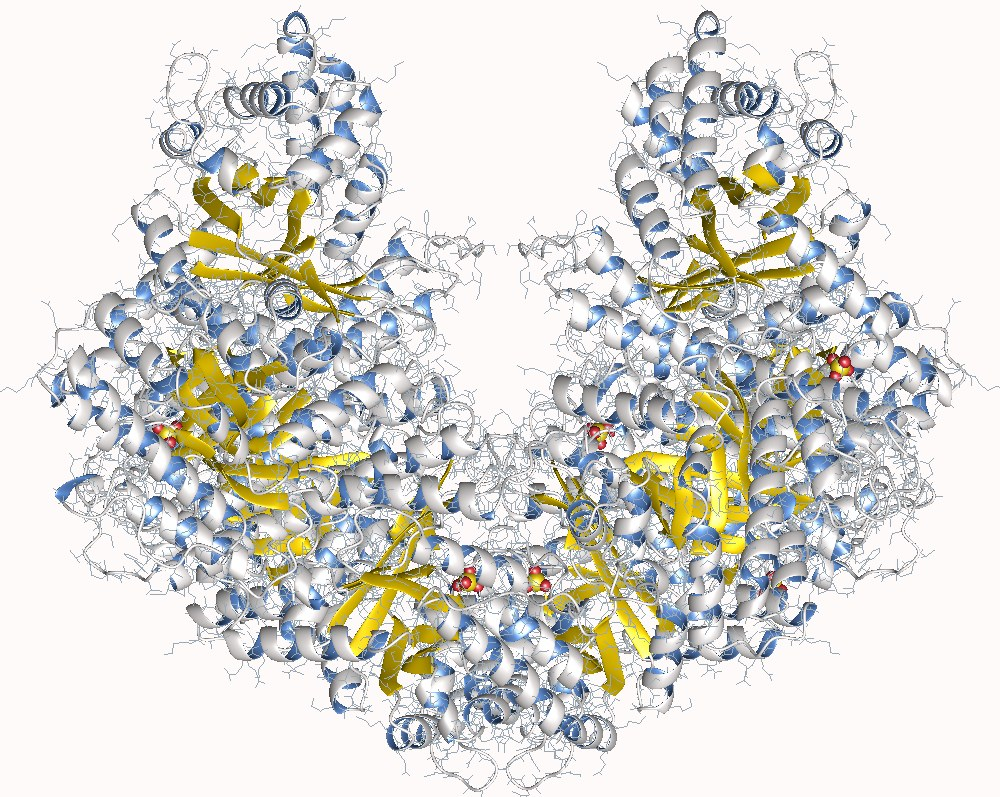
- Fructose-bisphosphate aldolase octamer, Human

Identifiers
- EC no.: 4.1.2.13
- CAS no.: 9024-52-6

Databases
- BRENDA: enzyme data
- ExPASy: NiceZyme view
- KEGG: enzyme entry
- MetaCyc: metabolic pathway
- Rhea: reactions
- PDB structures: RCSB PDB PDBe PDBsum
- Gene Ontology: AmiGO / QuickGO
Search
- PMC: articles
- PubMed: articles
- NCBI: proteins

Fructose-bisphosphate aldolase class-I
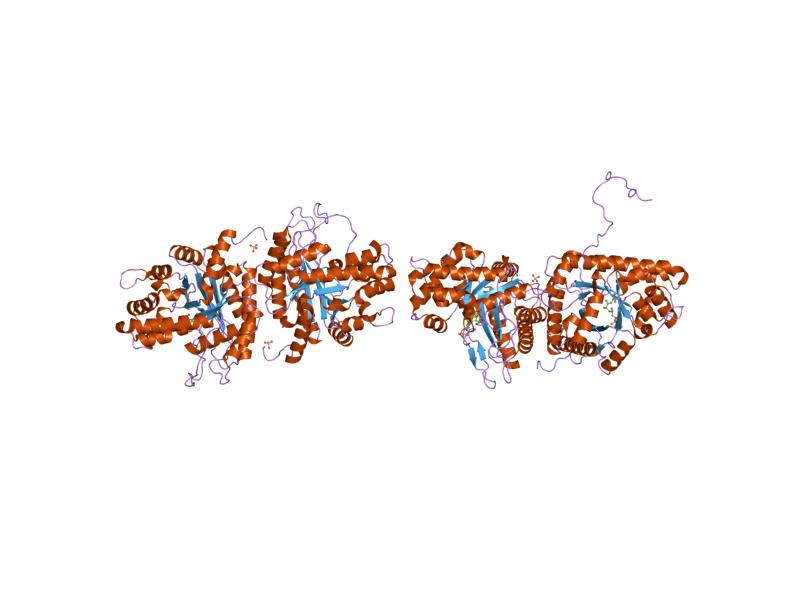
- fructose 1,6-bisphosphate aldolase from rabbit liver

Identifiers
- Symbol: Glycolytic
- Pfam: PF00274
- InterPro: IPR000741
- PROSITE: PDOC00143
- SCOP2: 1ald / SCOPe / SUPFAM
- CDD: cd00344
Available protein structures:
- PDB: IPR000741 PF00274 (ECOD; PDBsum)
- AlphaFold: IPR000741; PF00274

Fructose-bisphosphate aldolase class-II
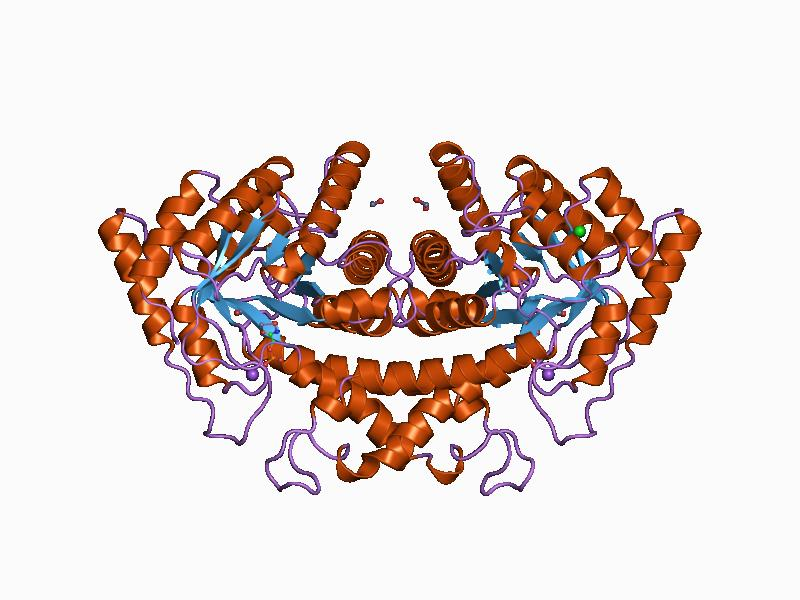
- class II fructose-1,6-bisphosphate aldolase in complex with phosphoglycolohydroxamate

Identifiers
- Symbol: F_bP_aldolase
- Pfam: PF01116
- Pfam clan: CL0036
- InterPro: IPR000771
- PROSITE: PDOC00523
- SCOP2: 1dos / SCOPe / SUPFAM
- CDD: cd00453
Available protein structures:
- PDB: IPR000771 PF01116 (ECOD; PDBsum)
- AlphaFold: IPR000771; PF01116

Fructose-bisphosphate aldolase (EC 4.1.2.13), often just aldolase, is an enzyme catalyzing a reversible reaction that splits the open-chained ketol fructose 1,6-bisphosphate into the triose phosphates dihydroxyacetone phosphate (DHAP) and glyceraldehyde 3-phosphate (G3P). Aldolase can also produce DHAP from other (3S,4R)-ketose 1-phosphates such as fructose 1-phosphate and sedoheptulose 1,7-bisphosphate. Gluconeogenesis and the Calvin cycle, which are anabolic pathways, use the reverse reaction. Glycolysis, a catabolic pathway, uses the forward reaction. Aldolase is divided into two classes by mechanism.

The word aldolase also refers, more generally, to an enzyme that performs an aldol reaction (creating an aldol) or its reverse (cleaving an aldol), such as Sialic acid aldolase, which forms sialic acid. See the list of aldolases.

== Mechanism and structure ==
Class I proteins form a protonated Schiff base intermediate linking a highly conserved active site lysine with the DHAP carbonyl carbon. Additionally, tyrosine residues are crucial to this mechanism in acting as stabilizing hydrogen acceptors. Class II proteins use a different mechanism which polarizes the carbonyl group with a divalent cation like Zn^{2+}. The Escherichia coli galactitol operon protein, gatY, and N-acetyl galactosamine operon protein, agaY, which are tagatose-bisphosphate aldolase, are homologs of class II fructose-bisphosphate aldolase. Two histidine residues in the first half of the sequence of these homologs have been shown to be involved in binding zinc.

The protein subunits of both classes each have an α/β domain folded into a TIM barrel containing the active site. Several subunits are assembled into the complete protein. The two classes share little sequence identity.

With few exceptions only class I proteins have been found in animals, plants, and green algae. With few exceptions only class II proteins have been found in fungi. Both classes have been found widely in other eukaryotes and in bacteria. The two classes are often present together in the same organism. Plants and algae have plastidal aldolase, sometimes a relic of endosymbiosis, in addition to the usual cytosolic aldolase. A bifunctional fructose-bisphosphate aldolase/phosphatase, with class I mechanism, has been found widely in archaea and in some bacteria. The active site of this archaeal aldolase is also in a TIM barrel.

== In gluconeogenesis and glycolysis ==
Gluconeogenesis and glycolysis share a series of six reversible reactions. In gluconeogenesis glyceraldehyde-3-phosphate is reduced to fructose 1,6-bisphosphate with aldolase. In glycolysis fructose 1,6-bisphosphate is made into glyceraldehyde-3-phosphate and dihydroxyacetone phosphate through the use of aldolase. The aldolase used in gluconeogenesis and glycolysis is a cytoplasmic protein.

Three forms of class I protein are found in vertebrates. Aldolase A is preferentially expressed in muscle and brain; aldolase B in liver, kidney, and in enterocytes; and aldolase C in brain. Aldolases A and C are mainly involved in glycolysis, while aldolase B is involved in both glycolysis and gluconeogenesis. Some defects in aldolase B cause hereditary fructose intolerance. The metabolism of free fructose in liver exploits the ability of aldolase B to use fructose 1-phosphate as a substrate. Archaeal fructose-bisphosphate aldolase/phosphatase is presumably involved in gluconeogenesis because its product is fructose 6-phosphate.

== In the Calvin cycle ==
The Calvin cycle is a carbon fixation pathway; it is part of photosynthesis, which convert carbon dioxide and other compounds into glucose. It and gluconeogenesis share a series of four reversible reactions. In both pathways 3-phosphoglycerate (3-PGA or 3-PG) is reduced to fructose 1,6-bisphosphate with aldolase catalyzing the last reaction. A fifth reaction, catalyzed in both pathways by fructose 1,6-bisphosphatase, hydrolyzes the fructose 1-6-bisphosphate to fructose 6-phosphate and inorganic phosphate. The large decrease in free energy makes this reaction irreversible. In the Calvin cycle aldolase also catalyzes the production of sedoheptulose 1,7-bisphosphate from DHAP and erythrose 4-phosphate. The chief products of the Calvin cycle are triose phosphate (TP), which is a mixture of DHAP and G3P, and fructose 6-phosphate. Both are also needed to regenerate RuBP. The aldolase used by plants and algae in the Calvin cycle is usually a plastid-targeted protein encoded by a nuclear gene.

== Reactions ==
Aldolase catalyzes

fructose 1,6-bisphosphate ⇌ DHAP + G3P

and also

sedoheptulose 1,7-bisphosphate ⇌ DHAP + erythrose 4-phosphate
fructose 1-phosphate ⇌ DHAP + glyceraldehyde

Aldolase is used in the reversible trunk of gluconeogenesis/glycolysis

2(PEP + NADH + H^{+} + ATP + H_{2}O) ⇌ fructose 1,6-bisphosphate + 2(NAD^{+} + ADP + P_{i})

Aldolase is also used in the part of the Calvin cycle shared with gluconeogenesis, with the irreversible phosphate hydrolysis at the end catalyzed by fructose 1,6-bisphosphatase

2(3-PG + NADPH + H^{+} + ATP + H_{2}O) ⇌ fructose 1,6-bisphosphate + 2(NADP^{+} + ADP + P_{i})
fructose 1,6-bisphosphate + H_{2}O → fructose 6-phosphate + P_{i}

In gluconeogenesis 3-PG is produced by enolase and phosphoglycerate mutase acting in series

PEP + H_{2}O ⇌ 2-PG ⇌ 3-PG

In the Calvin cycle 3-PG is produced by RuBisCO

RuBP + CO_{2} + H_{2}O → 2(3-PG)

G3P is produced by phosphoglycerate kinase acting in series with glyceraldehyde-3-phosphate dehydrogenase (GAPDH) in gluconeogenesis, and in series with glyceraldehyde-3-phosphate dehydrogenase (NADP+) (phosphorylating) in the Calvin cycle

3-PG + ATP ⇌ 1,3-bisphosphoglycerate + ADP
1,3-bisphosphoglycerate + NAD(P)H + H^{+} ⇌ G3P + P_{i} + NAD(P)^{+}

Triose-phosphate isomerase maintains DHAP and G3P in near equilibrium, producing the mixture called triose phosphate (TP)

G3P ⇌ DHAP

Thus both DHAP and G3P are available to aldolase.

== Moonlighting properties ==
Aldolase has also been implicated in many "moonlighting" or non-catalytic functions, based upon its binding affinity for many other proteins including F-actin, α-tubulin, light chain dynein, WASP, Band 3 anion exchanger, phospholipase D (PLD2), glucose transporter GLUT4, inositol trisphosphate, V-ATPase and ARNO (a guanine nucleotide exchange factor of ARF6). These associations are thought to be predominantly involved in cellular structure, however, involvement in endocytosis, parasite invasion, cytoskeleton rearrangement, cell motility, membrane protein trafficking and recycling, signal transduction and tissue compartmentalization have been explored.
